= Boeing B-17 Flying Fortress =

American heavy bomber aircraft

B-17 Flying Fortress
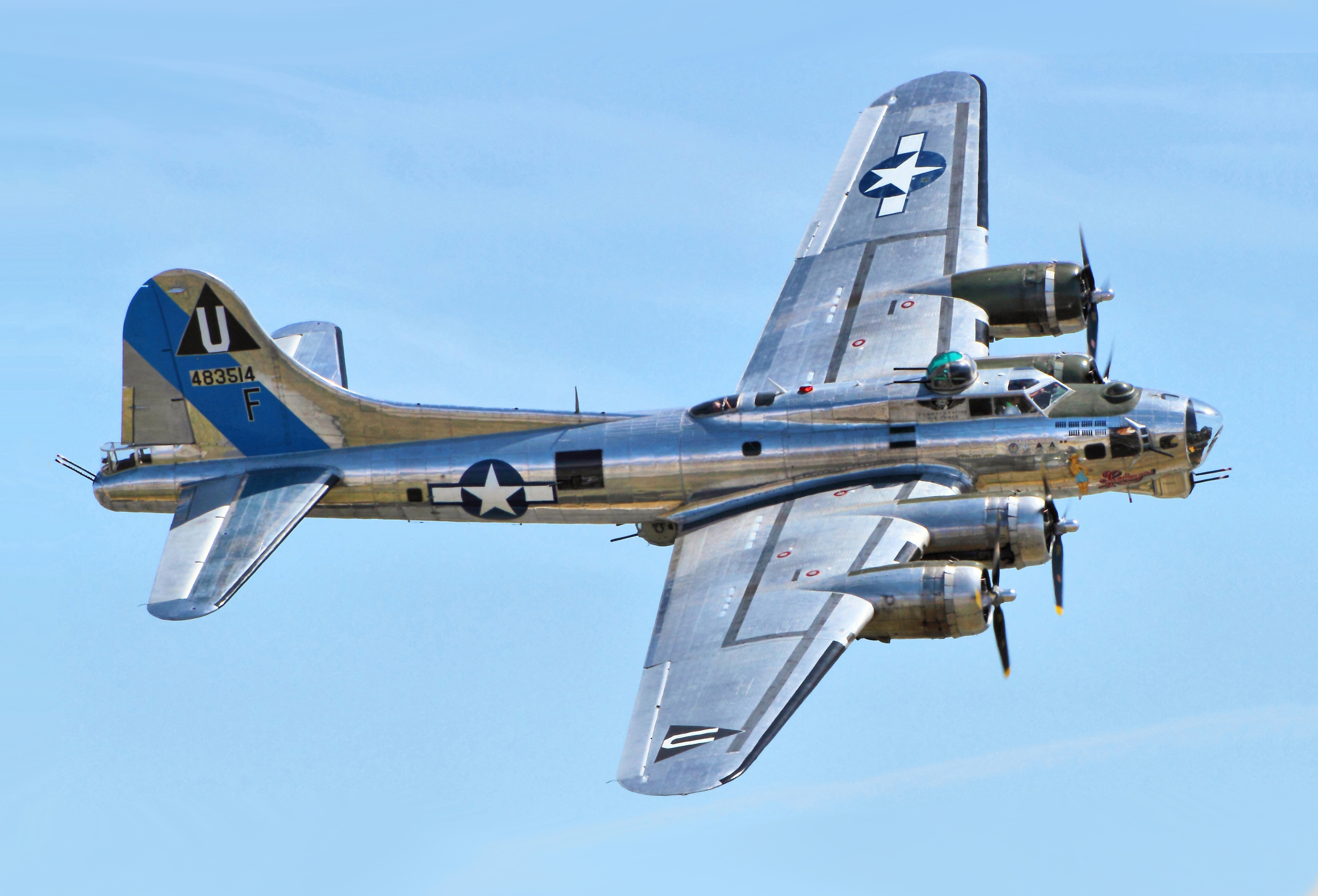
- A B-17G, Sentimental Journey, performing at the 2014 Chino Airshow in Chino, California

General information
- Type: Heavy bomber
- National origin: United States
- Manufacturer: Boeing
- Status: Retired; small number in service as warbirds
- Primary users: United States Army Air Forces Royal Air Force
- Number built: 12,731

History
- Manufactured: 1936–1945
- Introduction date: April 1938
- First flight: 28 July 1935
- Variants: Boeing XB-38 Flying Fortress; Boeing YB-40 Flying Fortress; Boeing C-108 Flying Fortress
- Developed into: Boeing 307 Stratoliner

The Boeing B-17 Flying Fortress is an American four-engined heavy bomber aircraft that was developed in the mid-1930s for the United States Army Air Corps (USAAC). A fast and high-flying bomber used primarily in the European Theater of Operations, the B-17 dropped more bombs than any other aircraft during World War II. It is the third-most produced bomber in history, behind the American four-engined Consolidated B-24 Liberator and the German multirole, twin-engined Junkers Ju 88. The B-17 was also employed in transport, anti-submarine warfare, and search and rescue roles.

In a USAAC competition, Boeing's prototype Model 299/XB-17 outperformed two other entries but crashed, losing the initial 200-bomber contract to the Douglas B-18 Bolo. Still, the Air Corps ordered 13 more B-17s for further evaluation, which were introduced into service in 1938. The B-17 evolved through numerous design advances but from its inception, the USAAC (from 1941 the United States Army Air Forces, USAAF) promoted the aircraft as a strategic weapon. It was a relatively fast, high-flying, long-range bomber with heavy defensive armament at the expense of bomb load. It also developed a reputation for toughness based upon stories and photos of badly damaged B-17s safely returning to air bases.

The B-17 saw early action in the Pacific War, where it conducted air raids against Japanese shipping and airfields. However, it was primarily employed by the USAAF in the daylight component of the Allied strategic bombing campaign over Europe, complementing RAF Bomber Command's night bombers in attacking German industrial, military and civilian targets. Of the roughly 1.5 million tons of bombs dropped on Nazi Germany and its occupied territories by Allied aircraft, over 640,000 tons (42.6%) were dropped from B-17s.

As of October 2025, three aircraft remain in flying condition, with several others being worked on to bring them to operational status. About 50 survive in storage or are on static display, the oldest of which is The Swoose, a B-17D which was flown in combat in the Pacific on the first day of the United States' involvement in World War II. Several reasonably complete wrecks have been found. B-17 survivors gained national attention in 2022 in the United States, when one, Texas Raiders, was destroyed in a fatal mid-air collision with a Bell P-63 Kingcobra at an airshow.

== Development ==
=== Origins ===
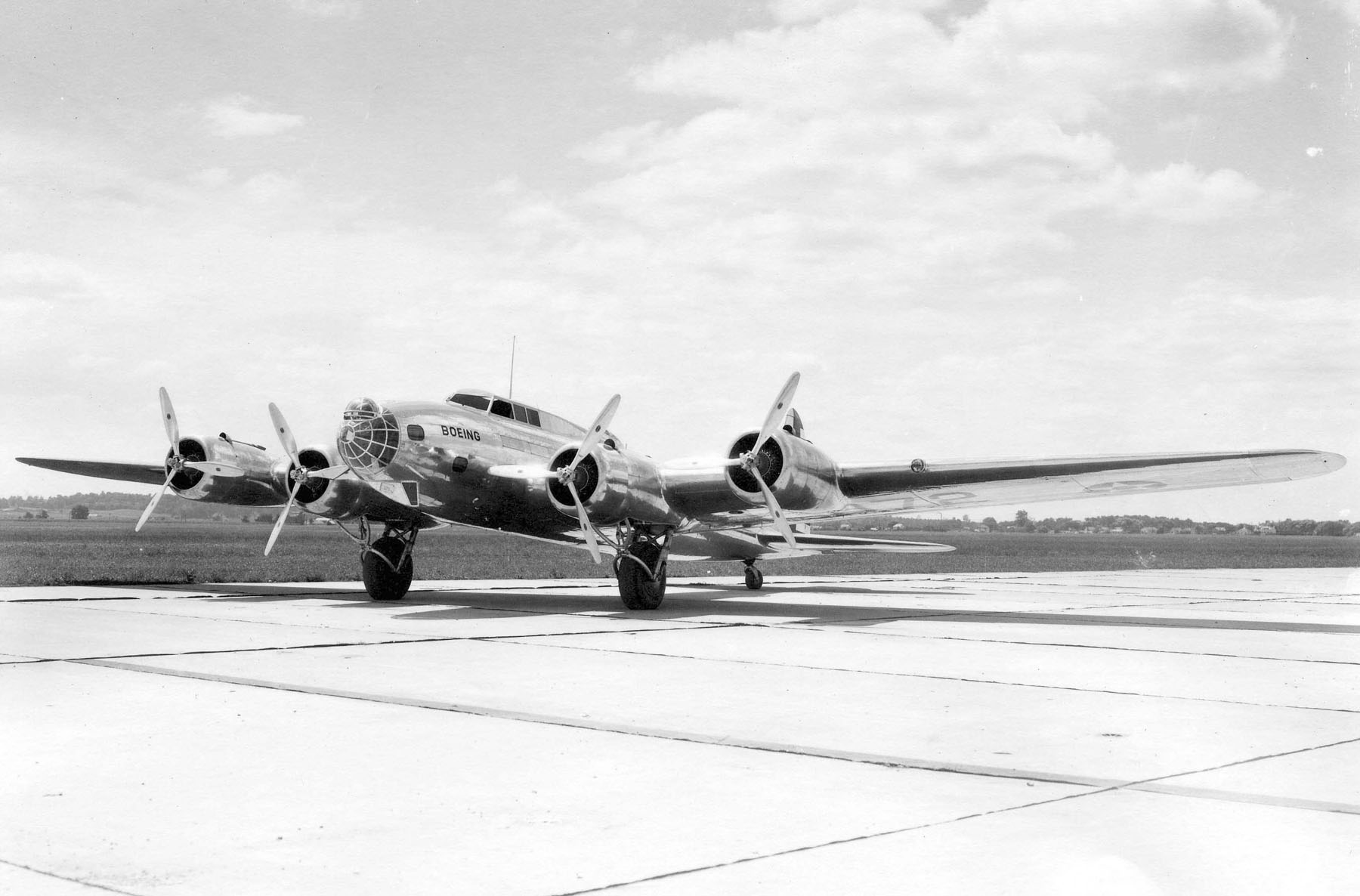
Model 299 NX13372

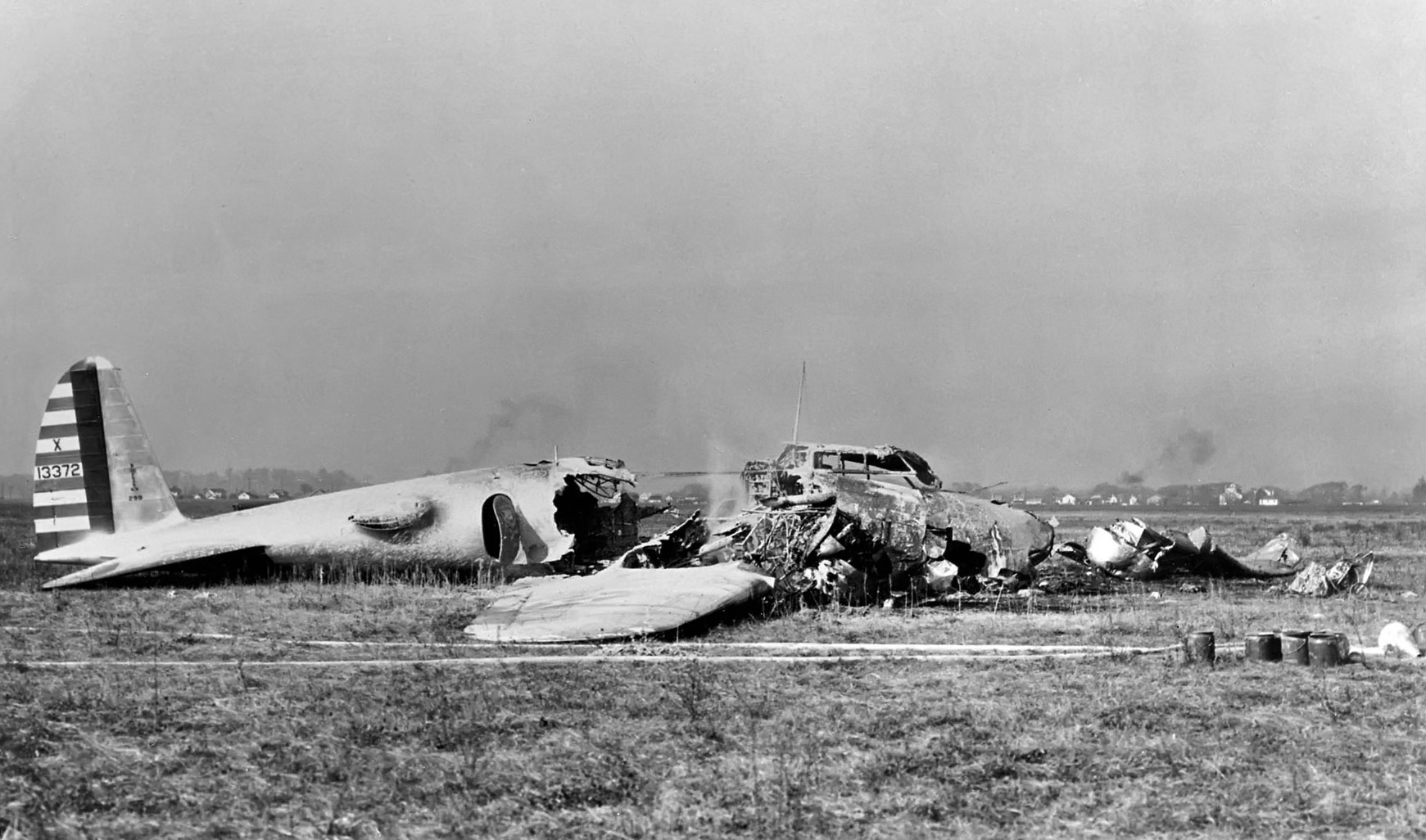
Crashed Model 299

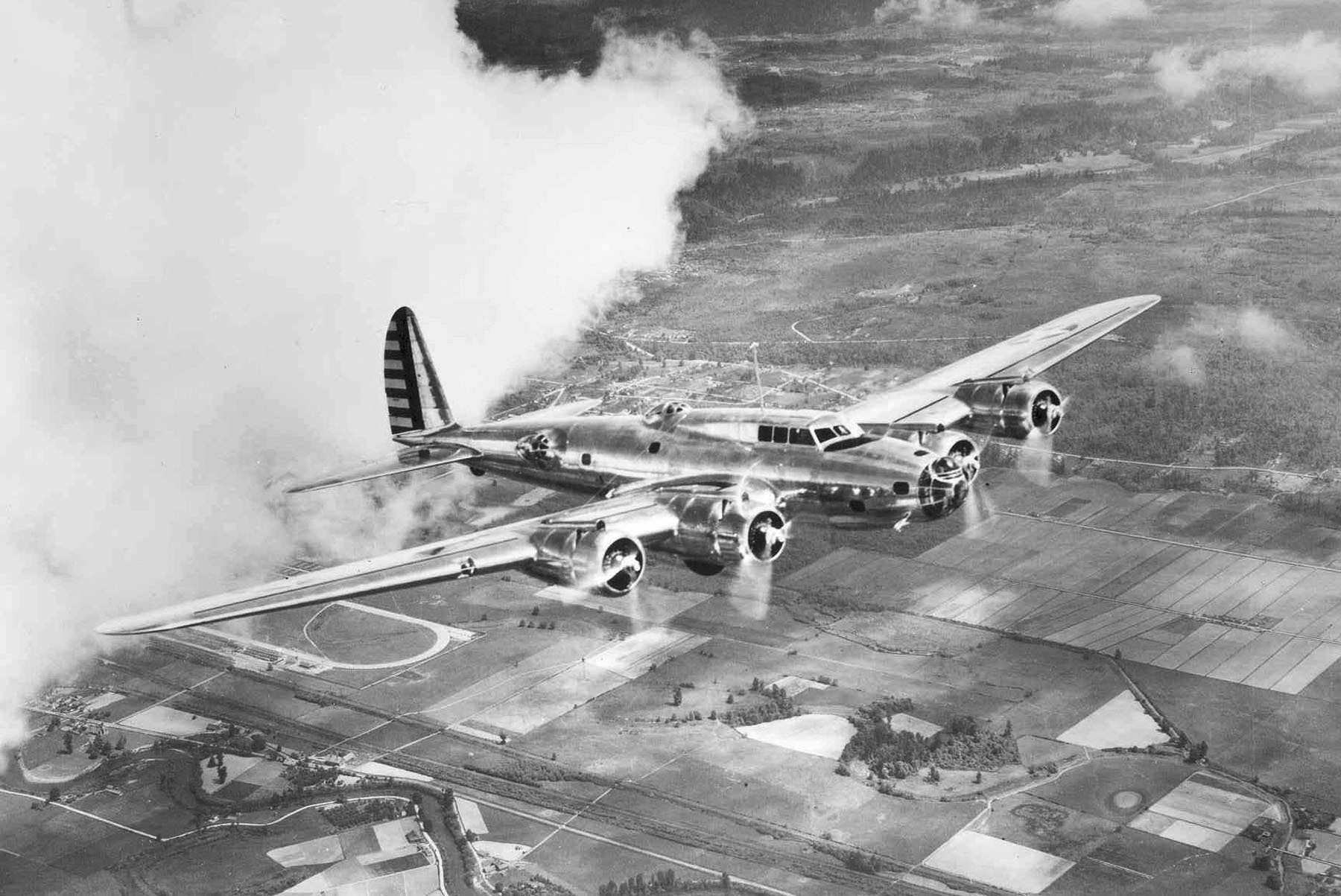
Boeing Y1B-17 in flight

On 8 August 1934, the USAAC tendered a proposal for a multi-engine bomber to replace the Martin B-10. The Air Corps was looking for a bomber capable of reinforcing the air forces in Hawaii, Panama, and Alaska. Requirements were for it to carry a "useful bomb-load" at an altitude of 10,000 ft (3,000 m) for 10 hours with a top speed of at least 200 mph (320 km/h).

They also desired, but did not require a bomber with a range of 2,000 mi (3,200 km) and a speed of 250 mph (220 kn; 400 km/h). The competition for the air corps contract was to be decided by a "fly-off" between Boeing's design, the Douglas DB-1, and the Martin Model 146 at Wilbur Wright Field in Dayton, Ohio.

The prototype XB-17, with the Boeing factory designation of Model 299, was designed by a team of engineers led by E. Gifford Emery and Edward Curtis Wells, and was built at Boeing's own expense. It combined features of the company's experimental XB-15 bomber and 247 transport. The B-17's armament consisted of five .30 caliber (7.62 mm) machine guns, with a payload up to 4,800 lb (2,200 kg) of bombs on two racks in the bomb bay behind the cockpit. The aircraft was powered by four Pratt & Whitney R-1690 Hornet radial engines, each producing 750 hp (600 kW) at 7,000 ft (2,100 m).

The first flight of the Model 299 was on 28 July 1935 with Boeing chief test pilot Leslie Tower at the controls. The day before, Richard Williams, a reporter for The Seattle Times, coined the name "Flying Fortress" when – observing the large number of machine guns sticking out from the new aircraft – he described it as a "15-ton flying fortress" in a picture caption. The most distinctive mount was in the nose, which allowed the single machine gun to be fired toward nearly all frontal angles.

Boeing was quick to see the value of the name and had it trademarked for use. (Note: The 1 January 1938 Air Corps News Letter noted the Langley Field correspondent used the appellation "Jeep" to the B-17, which it objected to as "not befitting" the aircraft and adding, "Why not let the term 'Flying Fortress' suffice?") Boeing also claimed in some of the early press releases that Model 299 was the first combat aircraft that could continue its mission if one of its four engines failed. On 20 August 1935, the prototype flew from Seattle to Wright Field in nine hours and three minutes with an average ground speed of 252 mph (219 kn; 406 km/h), much faster than the competition.

At the fly-off, the four-propped Boeing's performance was superior to those of the twin-engine DB-1 and Model 146. In March 1935 Army Chief of Staff General Douglas MacArthur created GHQ Air Force and promoted lieutenant colonel Frank Maxwell Andrews to brigadier general to become the head of GHQ Air Force. MacArthur and Andrews both believed that the capabilities of large four-engined aircraft exceeded those of shorter-ranged, twin-engine aircraft, and that the B-17 was better suited to new, emerging USAAC doctrine. Their opinions were shared by the air corps procurement officers, and even before the competition had finished, they suggested buying 65 B-17s.

On 30 October 1935, a test flight determining the rate of climb and service ceiling was planned. The command pilot was Major Ployer Peter Hill, Wright Field Material Division Chief of the Flying Branch, his first flight in the Model 299. Copilot was Lieutenant Donald L. Putt, while Boeing chief test pilot Leslie R. Tower was behind the pilots in an advisory role. Also on board were Wright Field test observer John Cutting and mechanic Mark Koegler. The plane stalled and spun into the ground soon after takeoff, bursting into flames. Though initially surviving the impact, Hill died within a few hours, and Tower on 19 November. Post-accident interviews with Tower and Putt determined the control surface gust lock had not been released. Doyle notes, "The loss of Hill and Tower, and the Model 299, was directly responsible for the creation of the modern written checklist used by pilots to this day."

The crashed Model 299 could not finish the evaluation, thus disqualifying it from the competition. While the Air Corps was still enthusiastic about the aircraft's potential, Army officials were daunted by its cost; Douglas quoted a unit price of $58,200 (equivalent to $1,074,000 in 2025) based on a production order of 220 aircraft, compared with $99,620 (equivalent to $1,838,000 in 2025 ) from Boeing. MacArthur's successor, Army Chief of Staff Malin Craig, canceled the order for 65 YB-17s and ordered 133 of the twin-engined Douglas B-18 Bolo, instead. Secretary of War Harry Hines Woodring in October 1938 decided that no four-engine bombers, including B-17s, would be purchased by the War Department in 1939.

The loss was not total... But Boeing's hopes for a substantial bomber contract were dashed.

— Peter Bowers, 1976

=== Initial orders ===
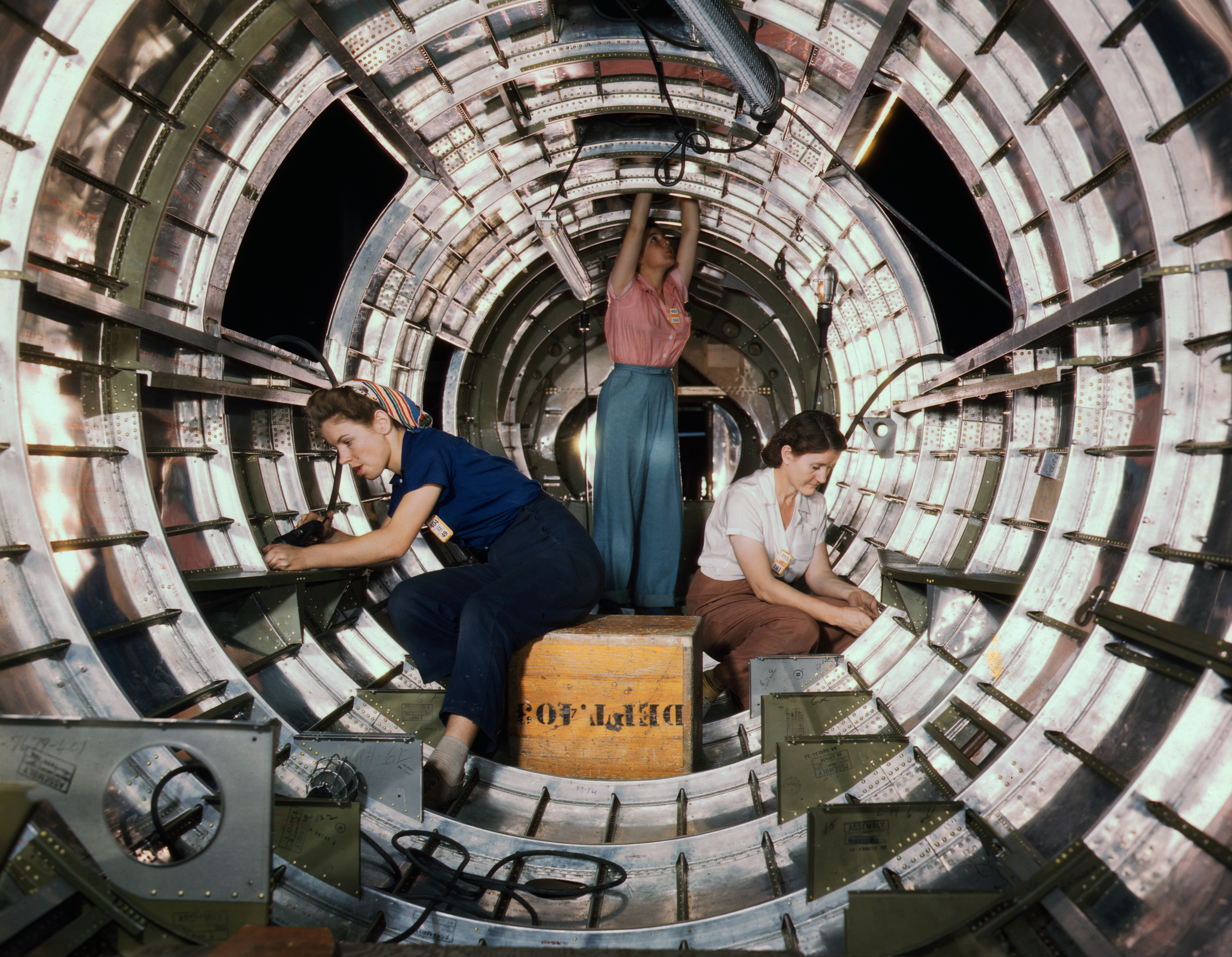
Installation of fixtures and assemblies on a tail fuselage section of a B-17 at the Douglas plant in Long Beach, California, October 1942

Despite the crash, the USAAC had been impressed by the prototype's performance, and on 17 January 1936, through a legal loophole, the Air Corps ordered 13 YB-17s (designated Y1B-17 after November 1936 to denote its special F-1 funding) for service testing. The YB-17 incorporated a number of significant changes from the Model 299, including more powerful Wright R-1820-39 Cyclone engines. Although the prototype was company-owned and never received a military serial (the B-17 designation itself did not appear officially until January 1936, nearly three months after the prototype crashed), the term "XB-17" was retroactively applied to the NX13372's airframe and has entered the lexicon to describe the first Flying Fortress.

Between 1 March and 4 August 1937, 12 of the 13 Y1B-17s were delivered to the 2nd Bombardment Group at Langley Field in Virginia for operational development and flight tests. One suggestion adopted was the use of a preflight checklist to avoid accidents such as that which befell the Model 299. (Note: The idea of a pilot's checklist spread to other crew members, other air corps aircraft types, and eventually throughout the aviation world. Life published the lengthy B-17 checklist in its 24 August 1942 issue.) In one of their first missions, three B-17s, directed by lead navigator Lieutenant Curtis LeMay, were sent by General Andrews to "intercept" and photograph the Italian ocean liner Rex 610 miles (980 km) off the Atlantic coast. The mission was successful and widely publicized. The 13th Y1B-17 was delivered to the Material Division at Wright Field, Ohio, to be used for flight testing.

Contemporary B-17 engine-build up and maintenance ground-crew instruction film.

A 14th Y1B-17 (37-369), originally constructed for ground testing of the airframe's strength, was upgraded by Boeing with exhaust-driven General Electric turbo-superchargers, and designated Y1B-17A. Designed by Sanford Moss, engine exhaust gases turned the turbine's steel-alloy blades, forcing high-pressure air into the Wright Cyclone GR-1820-39 engine supercharger. Scheduled to fly in 1937, it encountered problems with the turbochargers, and its first flight was delayed until 29 April 1938. The aircraft was delivered to the Army on 31 January 1939. Once service testing was complete, the Y1B-17s and Y1B-17A were redesignated B-17 and B-17A, respectively, to signify the change to operational status. The Y1B-17A had a maximum speed of 311 mph (270 kn; 501 km/h), at its best operational altitude, compared to 239 mph (208 kn; 385 km/h) for the Y1B-17. Also, the Y1B-17A's new service ceiling was more than 2 miles (3,200 m) higher at 38,000 feet (12,000 m), compared to the Y1B-17's 27,800 feet (8,500 m). These turbo-superchargers were incorporated into the B-17B.

Opposition to the Air Corps' ambitions for the acquisition of more B-17s faded, and in late 1937, 10 more aircraft designated B-17B were ordered to equip two bombardment groups, one on each US coast. Improved with larger flaps and rudder and a well-framed, 10 panel plexiglass nose, the B-17Bs were delivered in five small batches between July 1939 and March 1940. In July 1940, an order for 512 B-17s was issued, but at the time of the attack on Pearl Harbor, fewer than 200 were in service with the army.

A total of 155 B-17s of all variants were delivered between 11 January 1937 and 30 November 1941, but production quickly accelerated, with the B-17 once holding the record for the highest production rate for any large aircraft. (Note: Quote: "At the peak of production, Boeing was rolling out as many as 363 B-17s a month, averaging between 14 and 16 Forts a day, the most incredible production rate for large aircraft in aviation history." This production rate was, however, surpassed by that of the Consolidated B-24 Liberator: at its peak in 1944, the Willow Run plant alone produced one B-24 per hour and 650 B-24s per month.) The aircraft went on to serve in every World War II combat zone, and by the time production ended in May 1945, 12,731 B-17s had been built by Boeing, Douglas, and Vega (a subsidiary of Lockheed).

Though the crash of the prototype 299 in 1935 had almost wiped out Boeing, now it was seen as a boon. Instead of building models based on experimental engineering, Boeing had been hard at work developing their bomber and now had versions ready for production far better than would have been possible otherwise. One of the most significant weapons of World War II would be ready, but only by a hair.

— Jeff Ethell, 1985

== Design and variants ==
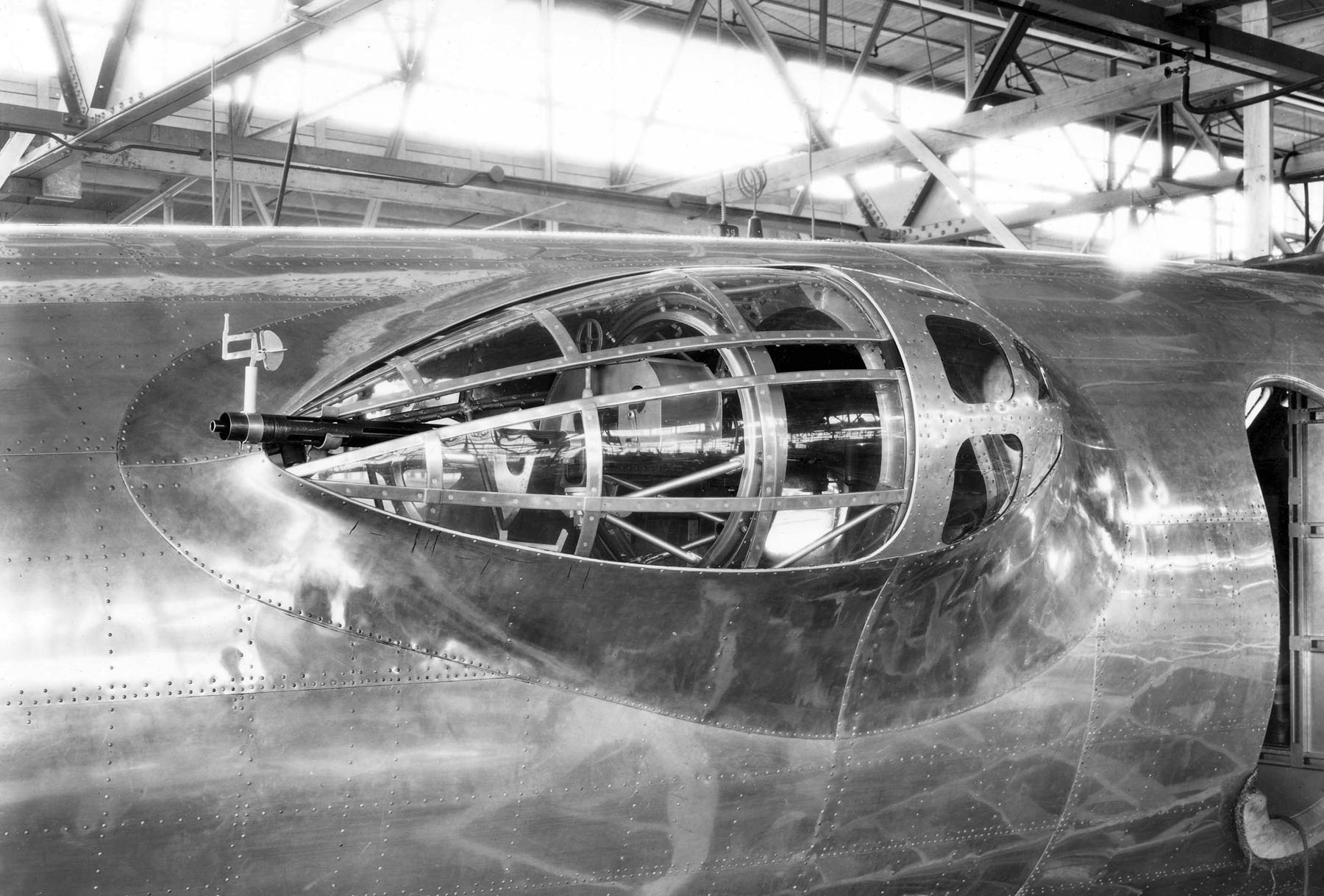
Waist position gun blister of Model 299, not adopted for production

Production numbers
Variant	Produced	First flight
Model 299	1	28 July 1935
YB-17	13	2 December 1936
YB-17A	1	29 April 1938
B-17B	39	27 June 1939
B-17C	38	21 July 1940
B-17D	42	3 February 1941
B-17E	512	5 September 1941
B-17F (total)	3,405	30 May 1942
B-17F-BO	2,300	
B-17F-DL	605	
B-17F-VE	500	
B-17G (total)	8,680	16 August 1943
B-17G-BO	4,035	
B-17G-DL	2,395	
B-17G-VE	2,250	
Total	12,731	
B-17s were built at Boeing Plant 2, Seattle, Washington (BO), Lockheed-Vega, Burbank, California (VE) and Douglas Aircraft, Long Beach, California (DL)

The aircraft went through several alterations in each of its design stages and variants. Of the 13 YB-17s ordered for service testing, 12 were used by the 2nd Bomb Group at Langley Field, Virginia, to develop heavy bombing techniques, and the 13th was used for flight testing at the Material Division at Wright Field, Ohio. Experiments on this aircraft led to the use of 4 General Electric turbo-superchargers, which later became standard on the B-17 line. A 14th aircraft, the YB-17A, originally destined for ground testing only and upgraded with the turbochargers, was redesignated B-17A after testing had finished.

As the production line developed, Boeing engineers continued to improve upon the basic design. To enhance performance at slower speeds, the B-17B was altered to include larger rudders and flaps. The B-17C changed from three bulged, oval-shaped gun blisters to two flush, oval-shaped gun window openings, and on the lower fuselage, a single "bathtub" gun gondola housing, which resembled the similarly configured and located Bodenlafette/"Bola" ventral defensive emplacement on the German Heinkel He 111P-series medium bomber.

While models A through D of the B-17 were designed defensively, the large-tailed B-17E was the first model primarily focused on offensive warfare. The B-17E was an extensive revision of the Model 299 design: The fuselage was extended by 10 ft (3.0 m); a much larger rear fuselage, vertical tailfin, rudder, and horizontal stabilizer were added; a gunner's position was added in the new tail; (Note: During the crash investigation of Boeing 307 Stratoliner NX19901, it was found that two B-17s had already spun from lack of directional stability. British combat experience with the B-17 was also showing the need for a tail gunner. Boeing was not willing to add a turret because they did not want to disrupt the clean aerodynamics. The inadequate directional stability exposed by two spin incidents and a crash, brought about a redesigned vertical stabilizer and dorsal fin. A compromise for the tail turret resulted in handheld tail guns. The combination created a successful design. Not only were defensive needs solved, but the improved lateral stability made precision high altitude bombing possible.) the nose (especially the bombardier's framed, 10-panel nose glazing) remained relatively the same as the earlier B through D versions had; a Sperry electrically powered manned dorsal gun turret just behind the cockpit was added; a similarly powered (also built by Sperry) manned ventral ball turret just aft of the bomb bay – replaced the relatively hard-to-use, Sperry model 645705-D remotely operated ventral turret on the earliest examples of the E variant. These modifications resulted in a 20% increase in aircraft weight. The B-17's turbocharged Wright R-1820 Cyclone 9 engines were upgraded to increasingly more powerful versions of the same powerplants throughout its production, and similarly, the number of machine gun emplacement locations was increased.

The B-17F variant was the primary version used by the Eighth Air Force to face the Germans in 1943, and standardized the manned Sperry ball turret for ventral defense, also replacing the earlier, 10-panel framed bombardier's nose glazing from the B subtype with an enlarged, nearly frameless Plexiglas bombardier's nose enclosure for improved forward vision.

Two experimental versions of the B-17 were flown under different designations, the XB-38 'Flying Fortress' and the YB-40 'Flying Fortress.' The XB-38 was an engine testbed for Allison V-1710 liquid-cooled engines, should the Wright engines normally used on the B-17 become unavailable. The only prototype XB-38 to fly crashed on its ninth flight, and the concept was abandoned. The Allison V-1710 was reallocated to fighter aircraft.

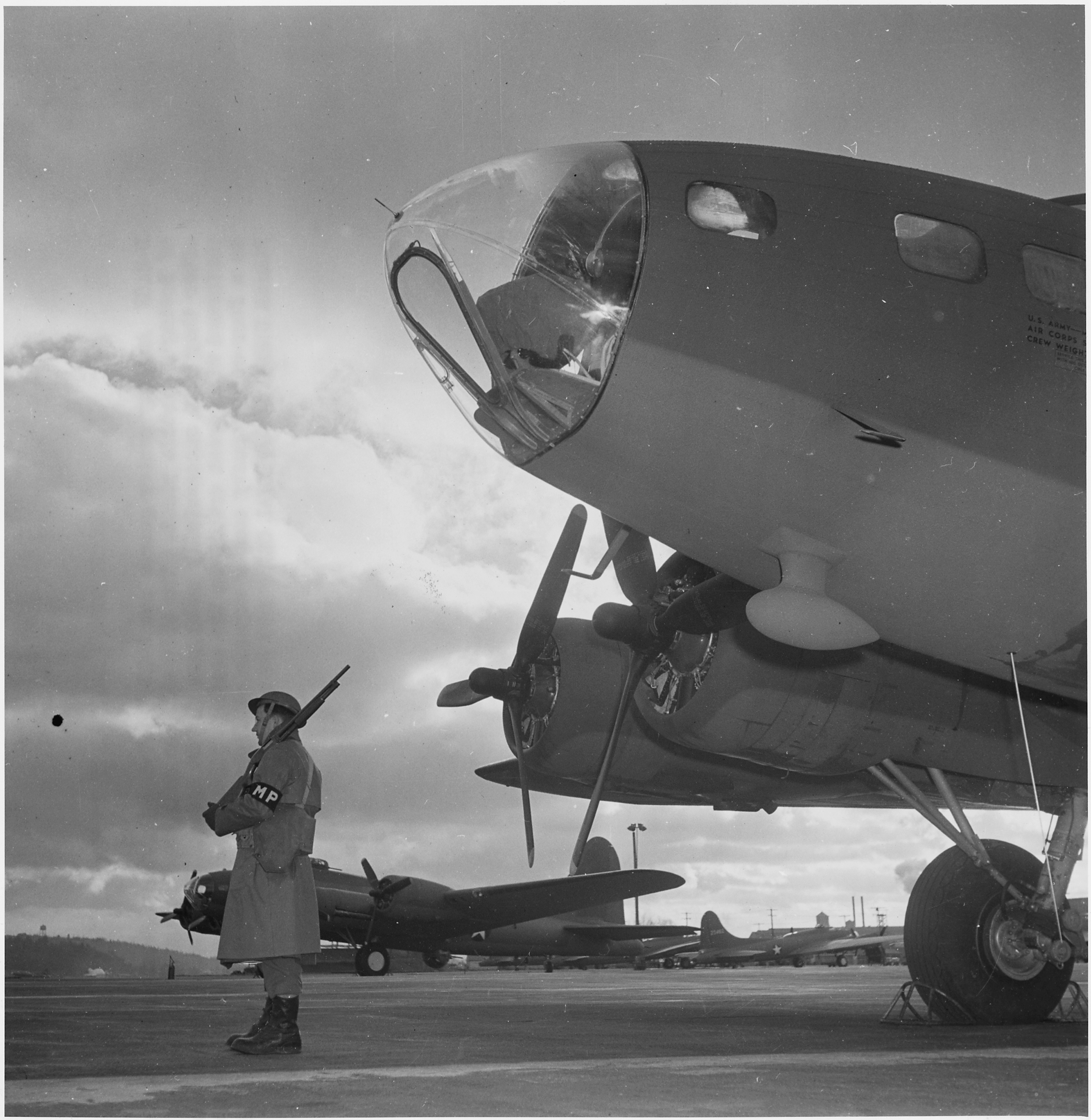
Boeing-built B-17Fs, with the clear-view two-piece Plexiglas bombardier's nose.

The YB-40 was a heavily armed modification of the standard B-17 used before the North American P-51 Mustang, an effective long-range fighter, became available to act as escort. Additional armament included an additional dorsal turret in the radio room, a remotely operated and fired Bendix-built "chin turret" directly below the bombardier's accommodation, and twin 50 caliber (12.7 mm) guns in each of the waist positions. The ammunition load was over 11,000 rounds. All of these modifications made the YB-40 well over 10,000 lb (4,500 kg) heavier than a fully loaded B-17F. The YB-40s with their greater weight, had trouble keeping up with the lighter bombers once they had dropped their bombs, so the project was abandoned and finally phased out in July 1943. The final production blocks of the B-17F from Douglas' plants did, however, adopt the YB-40's "chin turret", giving them a much-improved forward defense capability.

USAAF Boeing B-17 flight crew instruction film.

By the time the definitive B-17G appeared, the number of guns had been increased from 7 to 13, the designs of the gun stations were finalized, and other adjustments were completed. The B-17G was the final version of the Flying Fortress, incorporating all changes made to its predecessor, the B-17F, and in total, 8,680 were built, the last (by Lockheed) on 28 July 1945. Many B-17Gs were converted for other missions such as cargo hauling, engine testing, and reconnaissance. Initially designated SB-17G, a number of B-17Gs were also converted for search-and-rescue duties, later to be redesignated B-17H.

Late in World War II, at least 25 B-17s were fitted with radio controls and television cameras, loaded with 20,000 lb (9,100 kg) of high explosives and designated BQ-7 "Aphrodite missiles" for Operation Aphrodite against bombing-resistant German bunkers. The operation, which involved remotely flying the Aphrodite drones onto their targets by accompanying CQ-17 "mothership" control aircraft, was approved on 26 June 1944, and assigned to the 388th Bombardment Group stationed at RAF Fersfield, a satellite of RAF Knettishall.

The first four drones were sent to Mimoyecques (V-3 site), the Siracourt V-1 bunker, and the V-2 Blockhaus d'Éperlecques at Watten, and La Coupole at Wizernes on 4 August, causing little damage and two pilots were killed. On August 12, a Consolidated B-24 Liberator, part of the United States Navy's contribution ("Project Anvil"), en route for Heligoland piloted by Lieutenant Joseph P. Kennedy Jr. (future US president John F. Kennedy's elder brother) exploded over the Blyth estuary. Blast damage was caused over a radius of 5 miles (8.0 km). Naval flights stopped but a few more missions were flown by the USAAF. The Aphrodite project was effectively scrapped in early 1945.

== Operational history ==
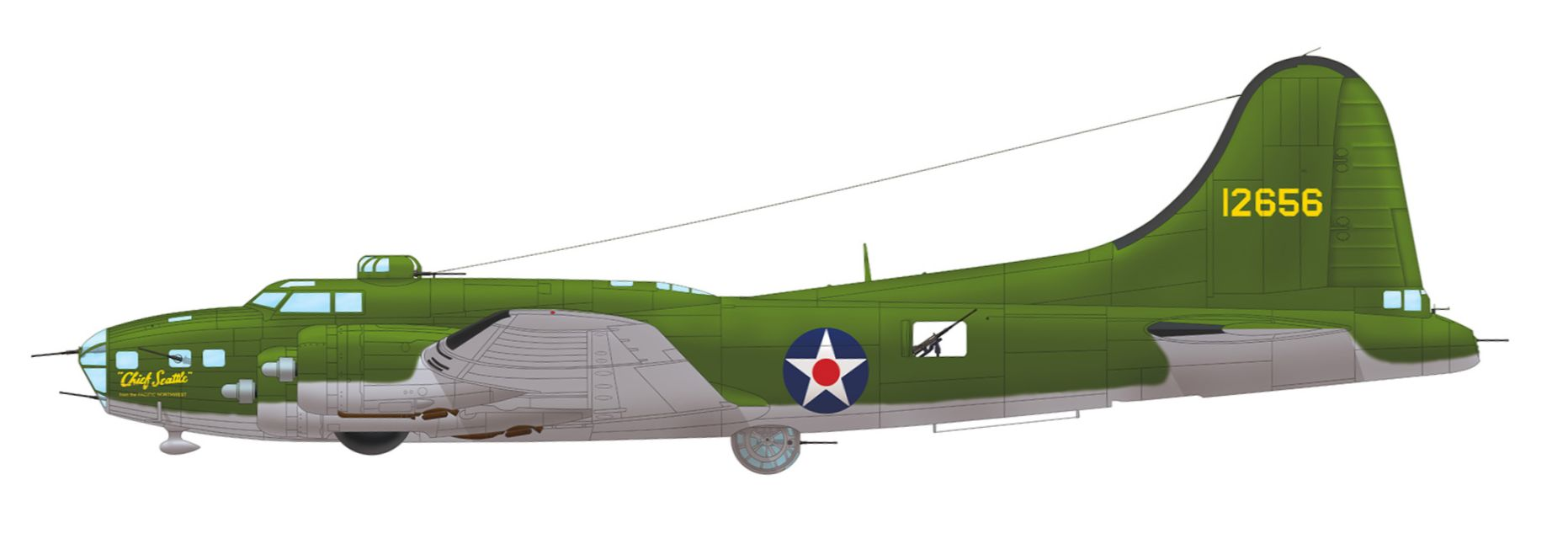
Boeing B-17E Flying Fortress of the 19th Bombardment Group USAAF, summer 1942

The B-17 began operations in World War II with the Royal Air Force (RAF) in 1941, and in the Southwest Pacific with the US Army.

During World War II, the B-17 equipped 32 overseas combat groups, inventory peaking in August 1944 at 4,574 USAAF aircraft worldwide. The British heavy bombers, the Avro Lancaster and Handley Page Halifax, dropped 608,612 long tons (681,645 short tons; 618,378 t) and 224,207 long tons (251,112 short tons; 227,805 t) respectively.

=== RAF use ===
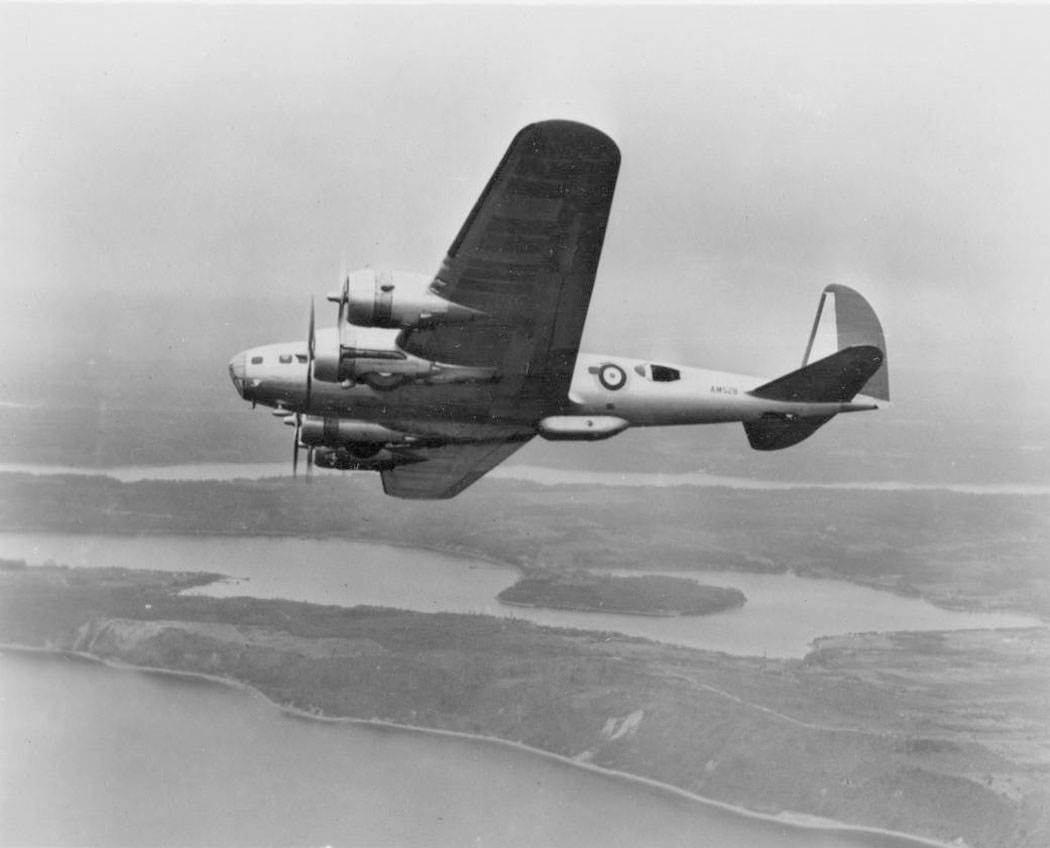
RAF Fortress I serial AN529, with He 111H-style "bathtub" ventral gondola

The RAF entered World War II without a sufficient supply of modern heavy bombers, with the largest available long-range medium bombers in any numbers being the Vickers Wellington, which could carry 4,500 pounds (2,000 kg) of bombs. While the Short Stirling and Handley Page Halifax became its primary bombers by 1941, in early 1940, the RAF agreed with the US Army Air Corps to acquire 20 B-17Cs, that were given the service name Fortress Mk.I. Their first operation, against Wilhelmshaven on 8 July 1941 was a failure. On 24 July three B-17s of 90 Squadron took part in a raid on the German capital ships Gneisenau and Prinz Eugen anchored in Brest from 30,000 ft (9,100 m), to draw German fighters away from 18 Handley Page Hampdens attacking at lower altitudes, and in time for 79 Vickers Wellingtons to attack later with the German fighters refueling. The operation did not work as expected, with 90 Squadron's Fortresses being unopposed.

By September, the RAF had lost eight B-17Cs in combat and had experienced numerous mechanical problems and Bomber Command abandoned daylight bombing raids using the Fortress I because of the aircraft's poor performance. (Note: problems the RAF found included the tendency to burn when hit, icing problems, crew fatigue due to altitude, oxygen system failures) The experience showed both RAF and USAAF that the B-17C was not ready for combat and that improved defensive armament, larger bomb loads, and more accurate bombing methods were required. The USAAF continued using the B-17 as a day bomber, despite misgivings by the RAF that attempts at daylight bombing would be ineffective.

As use by Bomber Command had been curtailed, the RAF transferred its remaining Fortress Mk.I aircraft to Coastal Command for use as a long-range maritime patrol aircraft. These were augmented starting in July 1942 by 45 Fortress Mk.IIA (B-17E) followed by 19 Fortress Mk II (B-17F) and three Fortress Mk III (B-17G). A Fortress IIA from 206 Squadron sank U-627 on 27 October 1942, the first of 11 U-boat kills credited to RAF Fortresses during the war.

As sufficient B-24 Liberators finally became available, Coastal Command withdrew the Fortress from the Azores, transferring the type for meteorological reconnaissance. Three squadrons undertook Met profiles from airfields in Iceland, Scotland, and England, gathering data for vital weather forecasting purposes.

The RAF's 223 Squadron, as part of 100 Group, operated several Fortresses equipped with an electronic warfare system known as "Airborne Cigar" (ABC). This was operated by German-speaking radio operators to identify and jam German ground controllers' broadcasts to their night fighters. They could also pose as ground controllers to steer night fighters away from the bomber streams.

=== Initial USAAF operations over Europe ===
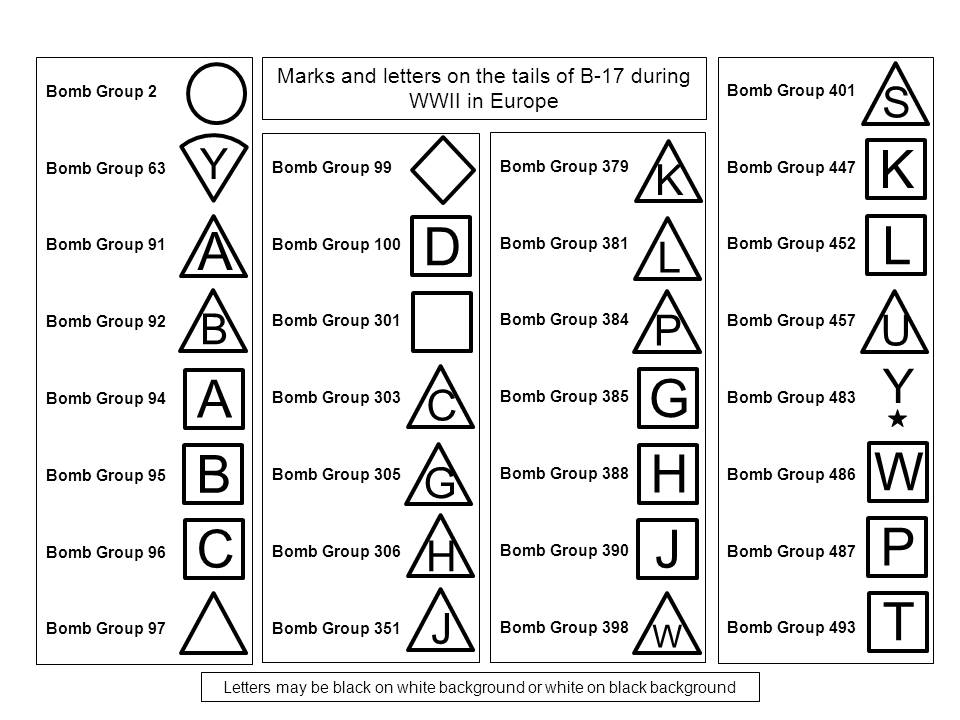
Marks and letters on the tails of B-17 during WWII in Europe

The US Army Air Corps – renamed United States Army Air Forces (USAAF) on 20 June 1941 – used the B-17 and other bombers to bomb from high altitudes with the aid of the secret Norden bombsight, known as the "Blue Ox", which was an optical electromechanical gyrostabilized analog computer. The device was able to determine, from variables put in by the bombardier, the point at which the bombs should be released to hit the target. The bombardier essentially took over flight control of the aircraft during the bomb run, maintaining a level altitude during the final moments before release.

The USAAF began building up its air forces in Europe using B-17Es soon after entering the war. The first Eighth Air Force units arrived in High Wycombe, England, on 12 May 1942, to form the 97th Bomb Group. On 17 August 1942, 12 B-17Es of the 97th, with the lead aircraft piloted by Major Paul Tibbets and carrying Brigadier General Ira Eaker as an observer, were close escorted by four squadrons of RAF Spitfire IXs (and a further five squadrons of Spitfire Vs to cover the withdrawal) on the first Eighth Air Force heavy bomber raid over Europe, against the large railroad marshalling yards at Rouen-Sotteville in France, while a further six aircraft flew a diversionary raid along the French coast. The operation, carried out in good visibility, was a success, with only minor damage to one aircraft, unrelated to enemy action, and half the bombs landing in the target area.

Two more groups arrived in Britain at the same time, bringing with them the first B-17Fs, which served as the primary AAF heavy bomber fighting the Germans until September 1943. As the raids of the American bombing campaign grew in numbers and frequency, German interception efforts grew in strength, such as during the attempted bombing of Kiel on 13 June 1943, such that unescorted bombing missions came to be discouraged.

=== Combined offensive ===
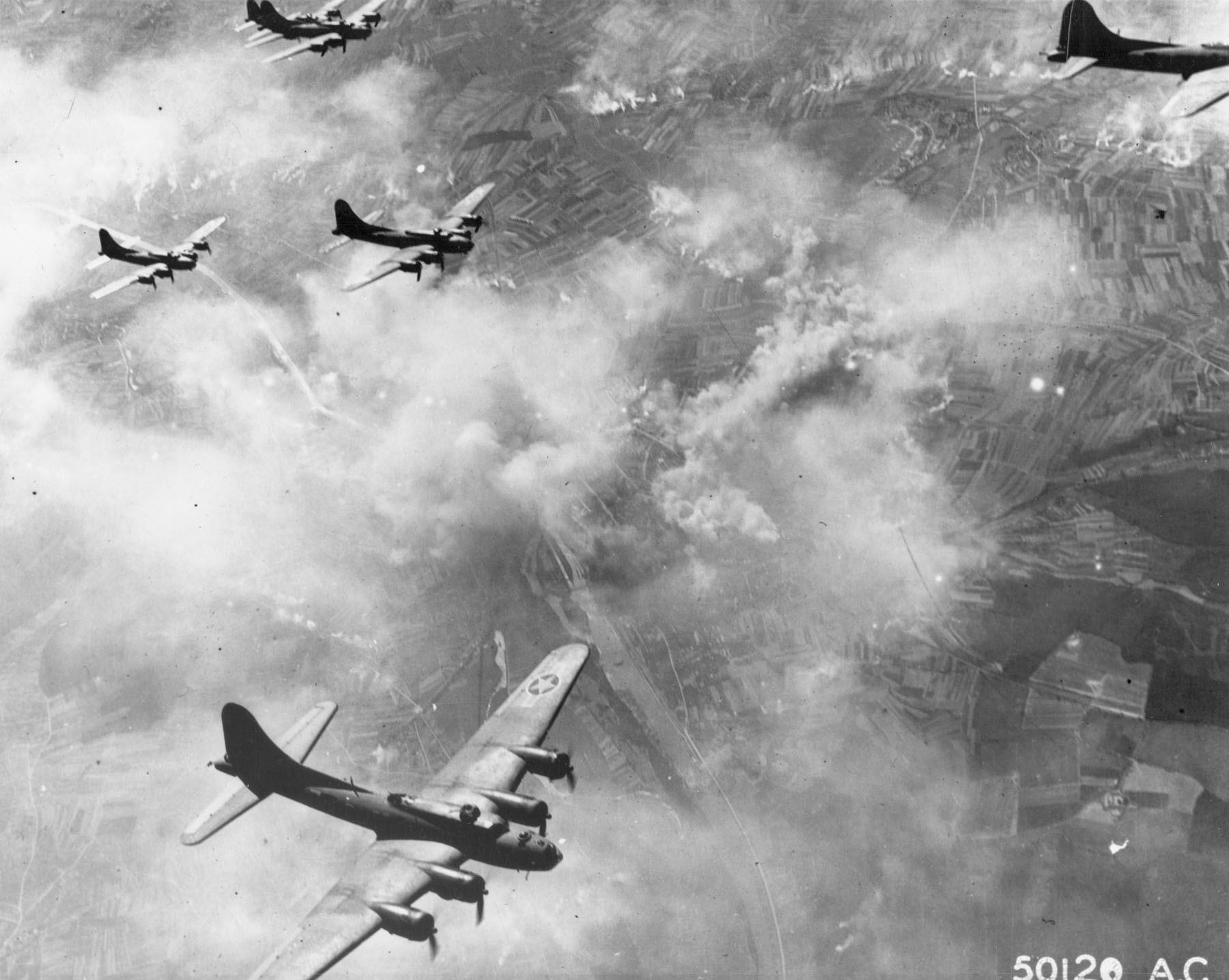
B-17F formation over Schweinfurt, Germany, 17 August 1943

The two different strategies of the American and British bomber commands were organized at the Casablanca Conference in January 1943. The resulting "Combined Bomber Offensive" weakened the Wehrmacht, destroyed German morale, and established air superiority through Operation Pointblank's destruction of German fighter strength in preparation for a ground offensive. The USAAF bombers attacked by day, with British operations – chiefly against industrial cities – by night.

Operation Pointblank opened with attacks on targets in Western Europe. General Ira C. Eaker and the Eighth Air Force placed highest priority on attacks on the German aircraft industry, especially fighter assembly plants, engine factories, and ball-bearing manufacturers. Attacks began in April 1943 on heavily fortified key industrial plants in Bremen and Recklinghausen.

The Norden Bombsight (1943) de-classified official USAAF training film reel.

Since the airfield bombings were not appreciably reducing German fighter strength, additional B-17 groups were formed, and Eaker ordered major missions deeper into Germany against important industrial targets. The 8th Air Force then targeted the ball-bearing factories in Schweinfurt, hoping to cripple the war effort there. The first raid on 17 August 1943 did not result in critical damage to the factories, with the 230 attacking B-17s being intercepted by an estimated 300 Luftwaffe fighters. The Germans shot down 36 aircraft with the loss of 200 men, and coupled with a raid earlier in the day against Regensburg, a total of 60 B-17s were lost that day.

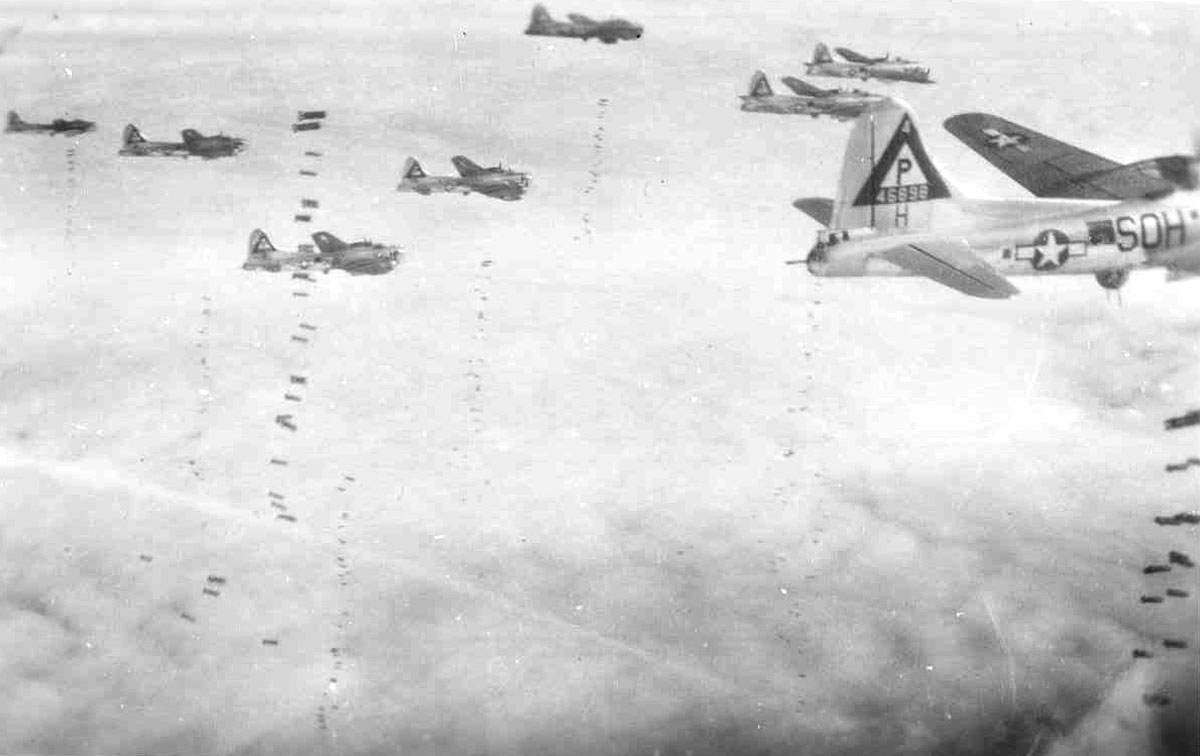
B-17Gs of the 384th Bomb Group on a bomb run, 1944

A second attempt on Schweinfurt on 14 October 1943 later came to be known as "Black Thursday". While the attack disrupted the entire works, severely curtailing work there for the remainder of the war, it was at an extreme cost. Of the 291 attacking Fortresses, 60 were shot down over Germany, 5 crashed on approach to Britain, and 12 more were scrapped due to damage – a loss of 77 B-17s. Additionally, 122 bombers were damaged and needed repairs before their next flights. Of 2,900 men in the crews, about 650 did not return, although some survived as prisoners of war. Only 33 bombers landed without damage. These losses were a result of concentrated attacks by over 300 German fighters.

1944 USAAF combined air-arms strategic bombing training film.

Such high losses of aircrews could not be sustained, and the USAAF, recognizing the vulnerability of heavy bombers to interceptors when operating alone, suspended daylight bomber raids deep into Germany until the development of an escort fighter that could protect the bombers all the way from the United Kingdom to Germany and back. At the same time the German nightfighting ability to counter the nighttime strikes noticeably improved, challenging the conventional faith in the cover of darkness. The 8th Air Force alone lost 176 bombers in October 1943, and was to suffer similar casualties on 11 January 1944 on missions to Oschersleben, Halberstadt, and Brunswick. Lieutenant General James Doolittle, commander of the 8th, had ordered the second Schweinfurt mission to be cancelled as the weather deteriorated, but the lead units had already entered hostile air space and continued with the mission. Most of the escorts turned back or missed the rendezvous and, as a result, 60 B-17s were destroyed.

A third raid on Schweinfurt on 24 February 1944 highlighted what came to be known as "Big Week", during which the bombing missions were directed against German aircraft production. German fighters needed to respond, and the North American P-51 Mustang and Republic P-47 Thunderbolt fighters (equipped with improved drop tanks to extend their range) accompanying the American heavies all the way to and from the targets engaged them. The escort fighters reduced the loss rate to below 7%, with a total of 247 B-17s lost in 3,500 sorties while taking part in the Big Week raids.

By September 1944, 27 of the 42 bomb groups of the 8th Air Force and 6 of the 21 groups of the 15th Air Force used B-17s. Losses to flak continued to take a high toll of heavy bombers through 1944, but the war in Europe was being won by the Allies. And by 27 April 1945, 2 days after the last heavy bombing mission in Europe, the rate of aircraft loss was so low that replacement aircraft were no longer arriving and the number of bombers per bomb group was reduced. The Combined Bomber Offensive was effectively complete.

=== Pacific Theater ===
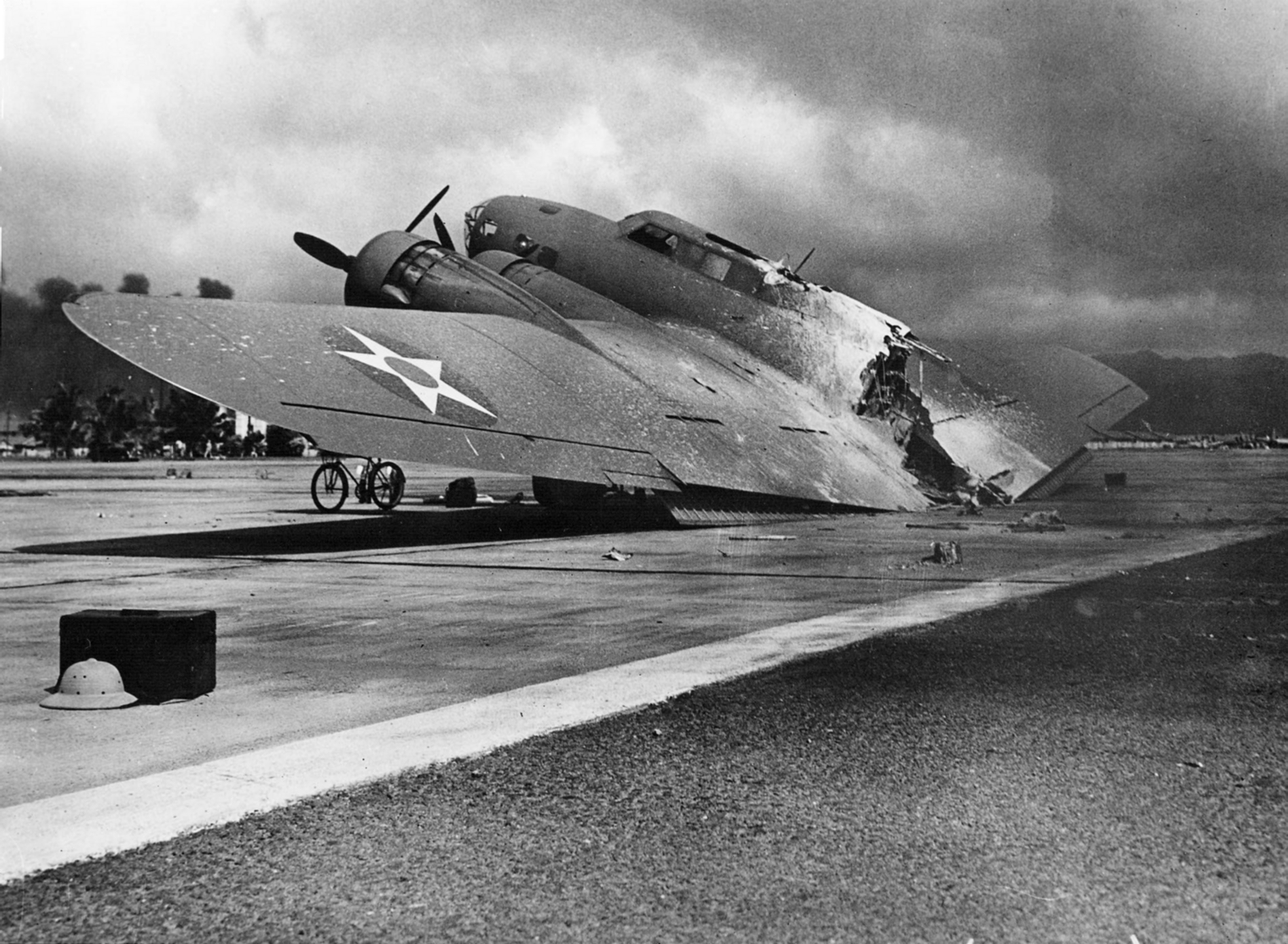
B-17C AAF S/N 40-2074 at Hickam Field: An onboard fire burnt the aircraft in two shortly after landing on 7 December 1941. One crewman was killed by a Zero attack.

On 7 December 1941, a group of 12 B-17s of the 38th (four B-17C) and 88th (eight B-17E) Reconnaissance Squadrons, en route to reinforce the Philippines, was flown into Pearl Harbor from Hamilton Field, California, arriving while the surprise attack on Pearl Harbor was going on. Leonard "Smitty" Smith Humiston, co-pilot on First Lieutenant Robert H. Richards' B-17C, AAF S/N 40-2049, reported that he thought the US Navy was giving the flight a 21-gun salute to celebrate the arrival of the bombers, after which he realized that Pearl Harbor was under attack. The Fortress came under fire from Japanese fighter aircraft, though the crew was unharmed with the exception of one member who suffered an abrasion on his hand. Japanese activity forced them to divert from Hickam Field to Bellows Field. On landing, the aircraft overran the runway and ran into a ditch, where it was then strafed. Although initially deemed repairable, 40-2049 (11th BG / 38th RS) received more than 200 bullet holes and never flew again. Ten of the twelve Fortresses survived the attack.

By 1941, the Far East Air Force (FEAF) based at Clark Field in the Philippines had 35 B-17s, with the War Department eventually planning to raise that to 165. When the FEAF received word of the attack on Pearl Harbor, General Lewis H. Brereton sent his bombers and fighters on various patrol missions to prevent them from being caught on the ground. Brereton planned B-17 raids on Japanese airfields in Formosa, in accordance with Rainbow 5 war plan directives, but this was overruled by General Douglas MacArthur. A series of disputed discussions and decisions, followed by several confusing and false reports of air attacks, delayed the authorization of the sortie. By the time the B-17s and escorting Curtiss P-40 Warhawk fighters were about to get airborne, they were destroyed by Japanese bombers of the 11th Air Fleet. The FEAF lost half its aircraft during the first strike, and was all but destroyed over the next few days.

Another early World War II Pacific engagement, on 10 December 1941, involved Colin Kelly, who reportedly crashed his B-17 into the Japanese battleship Haruna, which was later acknowledged as a near bomb miss on the heavy cruiser Ashigara. Nonetheless, this deed made him a celebrated war hero. Kelly's B-17C AAF S/N 40-2045 (19th BG / 30th BS) crashed about 6 mi (10 km) from Clark Field after he held the burning Fortress steady long enough for the surviving crew to bail out. Kelly was posthumously awarded the Distinguished Service Cross. Noted Japanese ace Saburō Sakai is credited with this kill, and in the process, came to respect the ability of the Fortress to absorb punishment. Sakai was a Shōtai leader in the squadron that engaged the bomber, although he and his two wingmen do not appear to have received official credit for the action.

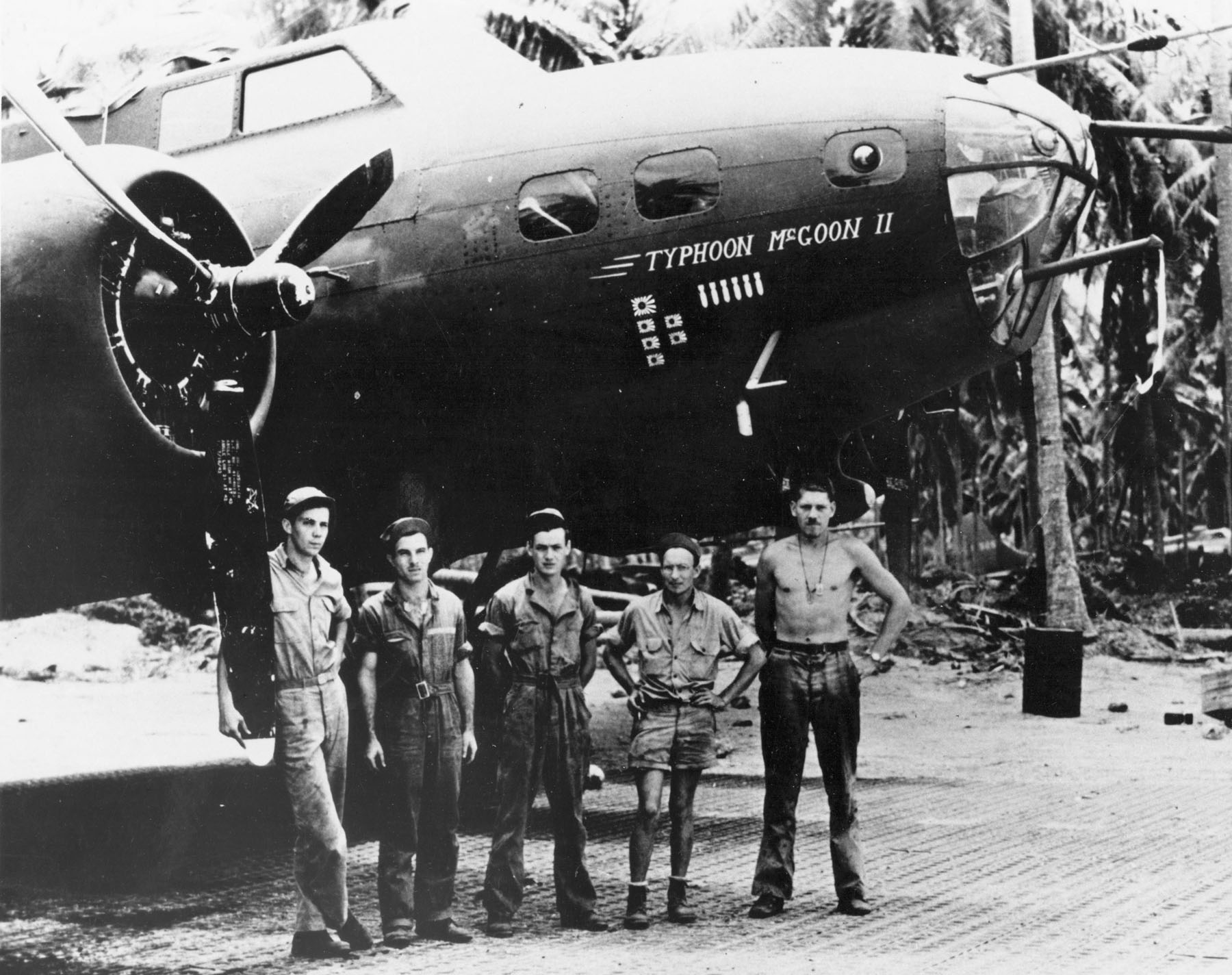
B-17E BO AAF S/N 41-9211 Typhoon McGoon II of the 11th BG / 98th BS, taken in January 1943 in New Caledonia: The antennas mounted upon the nose were used for radar tracking surface vessels.

B-17s were used in early battles of the Pacific with little success, notably the Battle of Coral Sea and Battle of Midway. While there, the Fifth Air Force B-17s were tasked with disrupting the Japanese sea lanes. Air Corps doctrine dictated bombing runs from high altitude, but they soon found only 1% of their bombs hit targets. However, B-17s were operating at heights too great for most A6M Zero fighters to reach.

The B-17's greatest success in the Pacific was in the Battle of the Bismarck Sea, in which aircraft of this type were responsible for damaging and sinking several Japanese transport ships. On 2 March 1943, six B-17s of the 64th Squadron flying at 10,000 ft (3,000 m) attacked a major Japanese troop convoy off New Guinea, using skip bombing to sink Kyokusei Maru, which carried 1,200 army troops, and damage two other transports, Teiyo Maru and Nojima. On 3 March 1943, 13 B-17s flying at 7,000 ft (2,000 m) bombed the convoy, forcing the convoy to disperse and reducing the concentration of their anti-aircraft defenses. The B-17s attracted a number of Mitsubishi A6M Zero fighters, which were in turn attacked by the P-38 Lightning escorts. One B-17 broke up in the air, and its crew was forced to take to their parachutes. Japanese fighter pilots machine-gunned some of the B-17 crew members as they descended and attacked others in the water after they landed. Five of the Japanese fighters strafing the B-17 aircrew were promptly engaged and shot down by three Lightnings, though these were also then lost. The allied fighter pilots claimed 15 Zeros destroyed, while the B-17 crews claimed 5 more. Actual Japanese fighter losses for the day were 7 destroyed and 3 damaged. The remaining seven transports and three of the eight destroyers were then sunk by a combination of low level strafing runs by Royal Australian Air Force Beaufighters, and skip bombing by USAAF North American B-25 Mitchells at 100 ft (30 m), while B-17s claimed five hits from higher altitudes. On the morning of 4 March 1943, a B-17 sank the destroyer Asashio with a 500 lb (230 kg) bomb while she was picking up survivors from Arashio.

At their peak, 168 B-17 bombers were in the Pacific theater in September 1942, but already in mid-1942 Gen. Arnold had decided that the B-17 was unsuitable for the kind of operations required in the Pacific and made plans to replace all of the B-17s in the theater with B-24s (and later, B-29s) as soon as they became available. Although the conversion was not complete until mid-1943, B-17 combat operations in the Pacific theater came to an end after a little over a year. Surviving aircraft were reassigned to the 54th Troop Carrier Wing's special airdrop section and were used to drop supplies to ground forces operating in close contact with the enemy. Special airdrop B-17s supported Australian commandos operating near the Japanese stronghold at Rabaul, which had been the primary B-17 target in 1942 and early 1943.

B-17s were still used in the Pacific later in the war, however, mainly in the combat search and rescue role. A number of B-17Gs, redesignated B-17Hs and later SB-17Gs, were used in the Pacific during the final year of the war to carry and drop lifeboats to stranded bomber crews who had been shot down or crashed at sea. These aircraft were nicknamed Dumbos, and remained in service for many years after the end of World War II.

=== Bomber defense ===
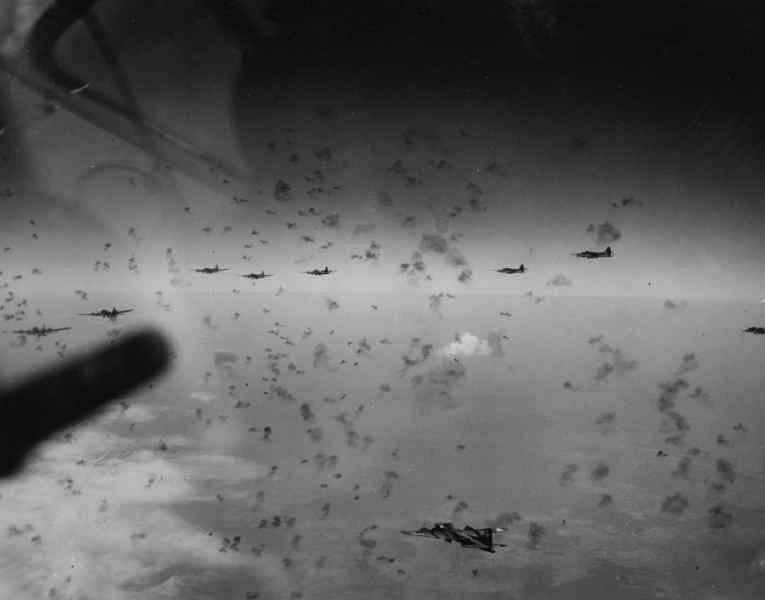
Formation flying through dense flak over Merseburg, Germany

Before the advent of long-range fighter escorts, B-17s had only their .50 caliber M2 Browning machine guns to rely on for defense during the bombing runs over Europe. As the war intensified, Boeing used feedback from aircrews to improve each new variant with increased armament and armor. Defensive armament increased from four 0.50 in (12.7 mm) machine guns and one 0.30 in (7.62 mm) nose machine gun in the B-17C, to thirteen 0.50 in (12.7 mm) machine guns in the B-17G. But because the bombers could not maneuver when attacked by fighters and needed to be flown straight and level during their final bomb run, individual aircraft struggled to fend off a direct attack.

A 1943 survey by the USAAF found that over half the bombers shot down by the Germans had left the protection of the main formation. To address this problem, the United States developed the bomb-group formation, which evolved into the staggered combat box formation in which all the B-17s could safely cover any others in their formation with their machine guns. This made a formation of bombers a dangerous target to engage by enemy fighters. In order to more quickly form these formations, assembly ships, planes with distinctive paint schemes, were used to guide bombers into formation, saving assembly time. Luftwaffe fighter pilots likened attacking a B-17 combat box formation to encountering a fliegendes Stachelschwein, "flying porcupine", with dozens of machine guns in a combat box aimed at them from almost every direction. However, the use of this rigid formation meant that individual aircraft could not engage in evasive maneuvers: they had to fly constantly in a straight line, which made them vulnerable to German flak. Moreover, German fighter aircraft later developed the tactic of high-speed strafing passes rather than engaging with individual aircraft to inflict damage with minimum risk.

The B-17 was noted for its ability to absorb battle damage, still reach its target and bring its crew home safely. Wally Hoffman, a B-17 pilot with the Eighth Air Force during World War II, said, "The plane can be cut and slashed almost to pieces by enemy fire and bring its crew home." Martin Caidin reported one instance in which a B-17 suffered a midair collision with a Focke-Wulf Fw 190, losing an engine and suffering serious damage to both the starboard horizontal stabilizer and the vertical stabilizer, and being knocked out of formation by the impact. The B-17 was reported as shot down by observers, but it survived and brought its crew home without injury. Its toughness was compensation for its shorter range and lighter bomb load compared to the B-24 and British Avro Lancaster heavy bombers. Stories circulated of B-17s returning to base with tails shredded, engines destroyed and large portions of their wings destroyed by flak. This durability, together with the large operational numbers in the Eighth Air Force and the fame achieved by the Memphis Belle, made the B-17 a key bomber aircraft of the war. Other factors such as combat effectiveness and political issues also contributed to the B-17's success.

The B-17 adopted early electronic countermeasures, such as Window and Carpet to confuse German radar. This greatly reduced the effectiveness of German Flak, by perhaps as much as 75%, meaning that 450 bombers were saved by these technologies.

=== Luftwaffe attacks ===
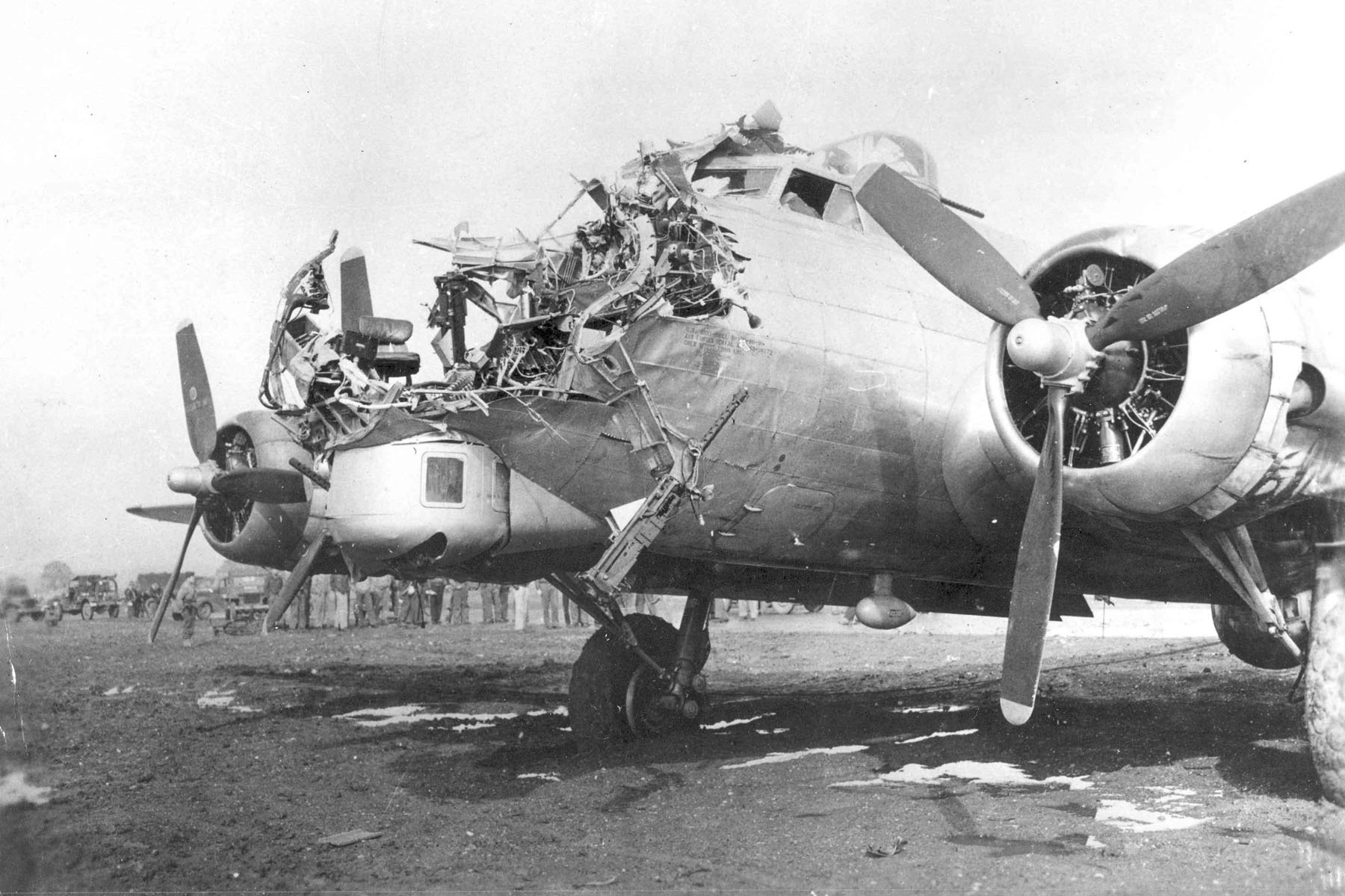
B-17G 43-38172 of the 8th AF 398th BG 601st BS which was damaged on a bombing mission over Cologne, Germany, on 15 October 1944; the bombardier was killed.

After examining wrecked B-17s and B-24s, Luftwaffe officers discovered that on average it took about 20 hits with 20 mm (0.79 in) shells fired from the rear to bring them down. Pilots of average ability hit the bombers with only about 2% of the rounds they fired, so to obtain 20 hits, the average pilot had to fire one thousand 20 mm rounds at a bomber. Early versions of the Fw 190, one of the best German interceptor fighters, were equipped with two 20 mm MG FF cannons, which carried only 500 rounds when belt-fed (normally using 60-round drum magazines in earlier installations), and later with the better Mauser MG 151/20 cannons, which had a longer effective range than the MG FF weapon. Later versions carried four or even six MG 151/20 cannon and twin 13 mm (0.51 in) machine guns. The German fighters found that when attacking from the front, where fewer defensive guns were mounted (and where the pilot was exposed and not protected by armor as he was from the rear), it took only four or five hits to bring a bomber down.

To rectify the Fw 190's shortcomings, the number of cannons fitted was doubled to four, with a corresponding increase in the amount of ammunition carried, creating the Sturmbock bomber destroyer version. This type replaced the vulnerable twin-engine Zerstörer heavy fighters which could not survive interception by P-51 Mustangs flying well ahead of the combat boxes in an air supremacy role starting very early in 1944 to clear any Luftwaffe defensive fighters from the skies. By 1944, a further upgrade to Rheinmetall-Borsig's 30 mm (1.2 in) MK 108 cannons mounted either in the wing, or in underwing, conformal mount gun pods, was made for the Sturmbock Focke-Wulfs as either the /R2 or /R8 field modification kits, enabling aircraft to bring a bomber down with just a few hits.

The adoption of the 21 cm Nebelwerfer-derived Werfer-Granate 21 (Wfr. Gr. 21) rocket mortar by the Luftwaffe in mid-August 1943 promised the introduction of a major "stand-off" style of offensive weapon – one strut-mounted tubular launcher was fixed under each wing panel on the Luftwaffe's single-engine fighters, and two under each wing panel of a few twin-engine Bf 110 daylight Zerstörer aircraft. However, due to the slow 715 mph (1,150 km/h) velocity and characteristic ballistic drop of the fired rocket (despite the usual mounting of the launcher at about 15° upward orientation), and the small number of fighters fitted with the weapons, the Wfr. Gr. 21 never had a major effect on the combat box formations of Fortresses. The Luftwaffe also fitted heavy-caliber Bordkanone-series 37, 50, and 75 mm (1.46, 1.97, and 2.95 in) cannon as anti-bomber weapons on twin-engine aircraft such as the special Ju 88P fighters, as well as one model of the Me 410 Hornisse but these measures did not have much effect on the American strategic bomber offensive. The Me 262, however, had moderate success against the B-17 late in the war. With its usual nose-mounted armament of four MK 108 cannons, and with some examples later equipped with the R4M rocket, launched from underwing racks, it could fire from outside the range of the bombers' 0.50 in (12.7 mm) defensive guns and bring an aircraft down with one hit, as both the MK 108's shells and the R4M's warheads were filled with the "shattering" force of the strongly brisant Hexogen military explosive.

=== Luftwaffe-captured B-17s ===
Captured B-17F-27-BO in Luftwaffe markings, the USAAF-named "Wulfe-Hound", 41-24585, of the 360th BS/303rd BG, was downed on 12 December 1942 near Leeuwarden, Netherlands, while on a raid on Rouen, France. The first Flying Fortress to fall intact into German hands, it was operated by Kampfgeschwader 200 from March 1944.

During World War II approximately 40 B-17s were captured and refurbished by Germany after crash-landing or being forced down, with about a dozen put back into the air. Given German Balkenkreuz national markings on their wings and fuselage sides, and swastika tail fin–flashes, the captured B-17s were used to determine the B-17's vulnerabilities and to train German interceptor pilots in attack tactics. Others, with the cover designations Dornier Do 200 and Do 288, were used as long-range transports by the Kampfgeschwader 200 special duties unit, carrying out agent drops and supplying secret airstrips in the Middle East and North Africa. They were chosen specifically for these missions as being more suitable for this role than other available German aircraft; they never attempted to deceive the Allies and always wore full Luftwaffe markings. One B-17 of KG200, bearing the Luftwaffe's KG 200 Geschwaderkennung (combat wing code) markings A3+FB, was interned by Spain when it landed at Valencia airfield, 27 June 1944, remaining there for the rest of the war. It has been alleged that some B-17s kept their Allied markings and were used by the Luftwaffe in attempts to infiltrate B-17 bombing formations and report on their positions and altitudes. According to these allegations, the practice was initially successful, but Army Air Forces combat aircrews quickly developed and established standard procedures to first warn off, and then fire upon any "stranger" trying to join a group's formation.

=== Soviet-interned B-17s ===
The US did not offer B-17s to the Soviet Union as part of its war materiel assistance program, but at least 73 aircraft were acquired by the Soviet Air Force. These aircraft had landed with mechanical trouble during the shuttle bombing raids over Germany or had been damaged by a Luftwaffe raid in Poltava. The Soviets restored 23 to flying condition and concentrated them in the 890th Bomber Regiment of the 45th Bomber Aviation Division, but they never saw combat. In 1946 (or 1947, according to Holm), the regiment was assigned to the Kazan factory (moving from Baranovichi) to help the Soviet effort to reproduce the more advanced Boeing B-29 as the Tupolev Tu-4.

=== Swiss-interned B-17s ===
During the Allied bomber offensive, some US and British bombers landed in Switzerland and were interned. Some had been damaged and were unable to get back to Allied bases. Others flew into Swiss airspace due to navigation errors, and on rare occasions, accidentally bombed Swiss cities. Swiss fighter aircraft intercepted such aircraft and sought to force them to land.

In October 1943, a B-17F-25-VE (tail number 25841) developed engine trouble after a raid over Germany and was forced to land in Switzerland. The plane and its US flight crew were interned. The aircraft was turned over to the Swiss Air Force, which flew the bomber until the end of the war, using other interned but non-airworthy B-17s for spare parts. The bomber's topside surfaces were repainted a dark olive drab, but it retained its light gray underwing and lower fuselage surfaces. It carried the Swiss national white cross insignia in red squares on the topside and underside of its wings, and on both sides of its rudder and its fuselage, with the light gray flash letters "RD" and "I" on either side of the fuselage insignias.

=== Japanese-captured B-17s ===
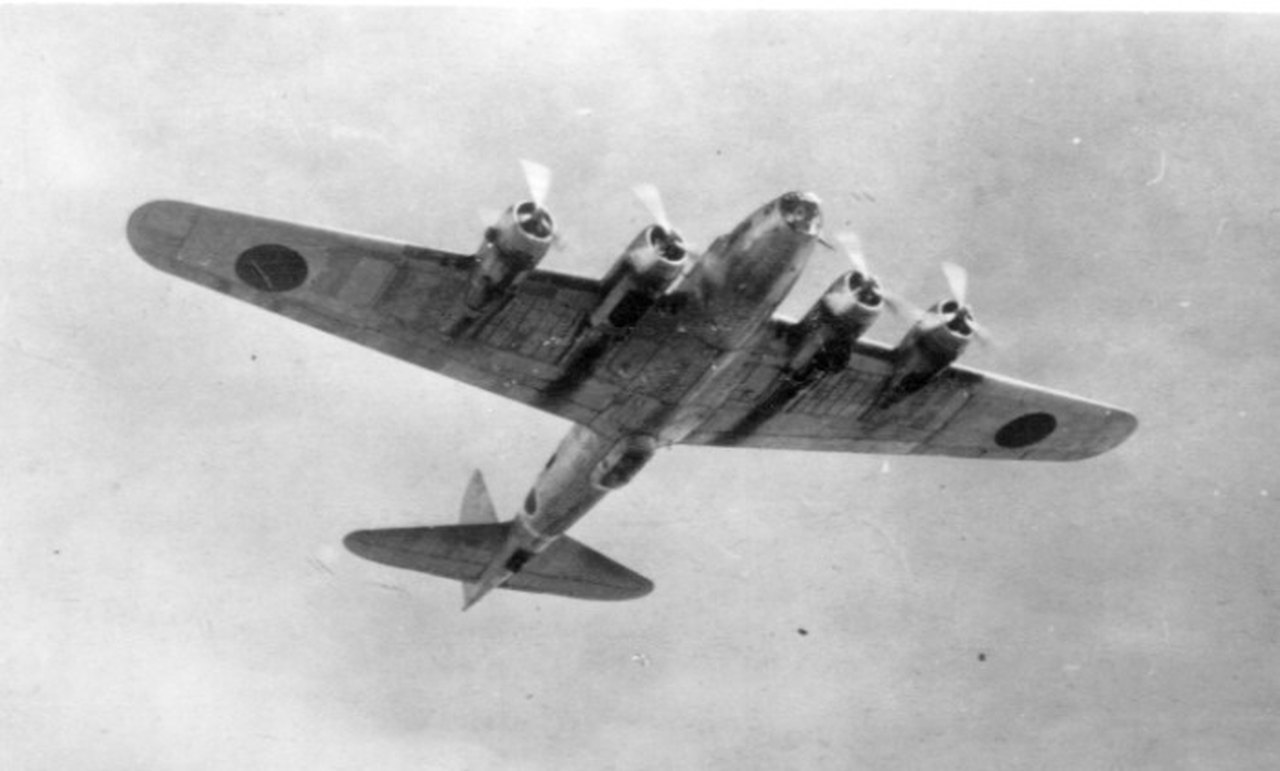
This captured USAAF Boeing B-17D, in Japanese livery, was flown to Japan for technical evaluation.

In 1942, Japanese technicians and mechanics rebuilt three damaged B-17s, one "D" and two "E" series, using parts salvaged from abandoned B-17 wrecks in the Philippines and the Java East Indies. The three bombers, which still contained their top-secret Norden bombsights, were ferried to Japan where they underwent extensive technical evaluation by the Giken, the Imperial Japanese Army Air Force's Air Technical Research Institute (Koku Gijutsu Kenkyujo) at Tachikawa's air field. The "D" model, later deemed an obsolescent design, was used in Japanese training and propaganda films. The two "E"s were used to develop air combat tactics for use against B-17s; they were also used as enemy aircraft in pilot and crew training films. One of the two "E"s was photographed late in the war by US aerial recon. It was code-named "Tachikawa 105" after the mystery aircraft's wingspan (104 ft (32 m)) but not correctly identified as a captured B-17 until after the war. No traces of the three captured Flying Fortresses were ever found in Japan by Allied occupation forces. The bombers were assumed either lost by various means or scrapped late in the war for their vital war materials.

=== Postwar history ===
==== US Air Force ====
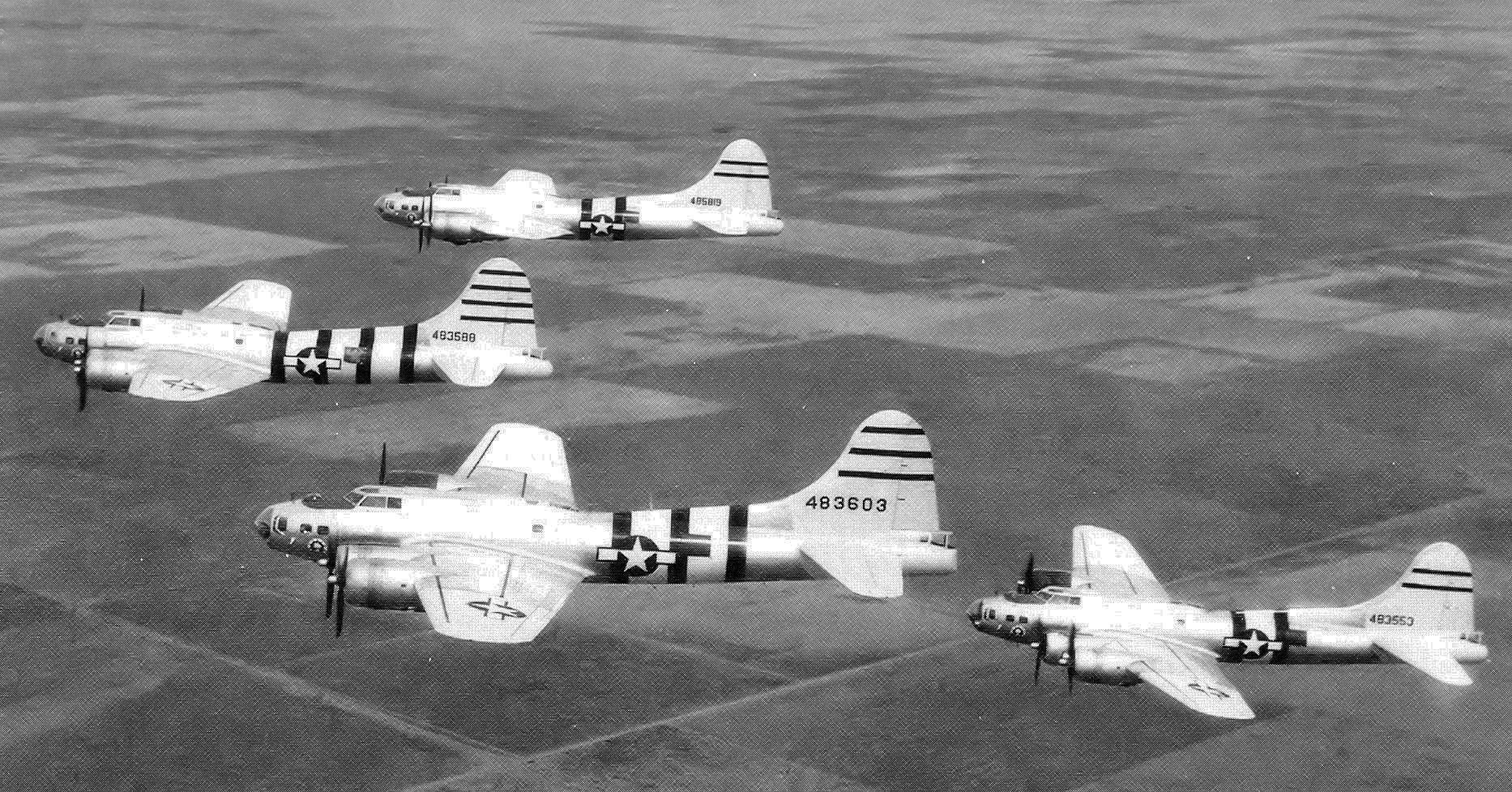
QB-17 Flying Fortress drones over New Mexico, April 1946

After World War II, the B-17 was quickly phased out of use as a bomber and the Army Air Forces retired most of its fleet. Flight crews ferried the bombers back across the Atlantic to the United States where the majority were sold for scrap and melted down, although many remained in use in second-line roles such as VIP transports, air-sea rescue and photo-reconnaissance. Strategic Air Command (SAC), established in 1946, used reconnaissance B-17s (at first called F-9 [F for Fotorecon], later RB-17) until 1949.

The USAF Air Rescue Service of the Military Air Transport Service (MATS) operated B-17s as so-called "Dumbo" air-sea rescue aircraft. Work on using B-17s to carry airborne lifeboats had begun in 1943, but they entered service in the European theater only in February 1945. They were also used to provide search and rescue support for B-29 raids against Japan. About 130 B-17s were converted to the air-sea rescue role, at first designated B-17H and later SB-17G. Some SB-17s had their defensive guns removed, while others retained their guns to allow use close to combat areas. The SB-17 served through the Korean War, remaining in service with USAF until the mid-1950s.

In 1946, surplus B-17s were chosen as drone aircraft for atmospheric sampling during the Operation Crossroads atomic bomb tests, being able to fly close to or even through the mushroom clouds without endangering a crew. This led to more widespread conversion of B-17s as drones and drone control aircraft, both for further use in atomic testing and as targets for testing surface-to-air and air-to-air missiles. One hundred and seven B-17s were converted to drones. The last operational mission flown by a USAF Fortress was conducted on 6 August 1959, when a DB-17P, serial 44-83684 , directed a QB-17G, out of Holloman Air Force Base, New Mexico, as a target for an AIM-4 Falcon air-to-air missile fired from a McDonnell F-101 Voodoo. A retirement ceremony was held several days later at Holloman AFB, after which 44-83684 was retired. It was subsequently used in various films and in the 1960s television show 12 O'Clock High before being retired to the Planes of Fame aviation museum in Chino, California. Perhaps the most famous B-17, the Memphis Belle, has been restored – with the B-17D The Swoose under way – to her World War II wartime appearance by the National Museum of the United States Air Force at Wright-Patterson Air Force Base, Ohio.

==== US Navy and Coast Guard ====
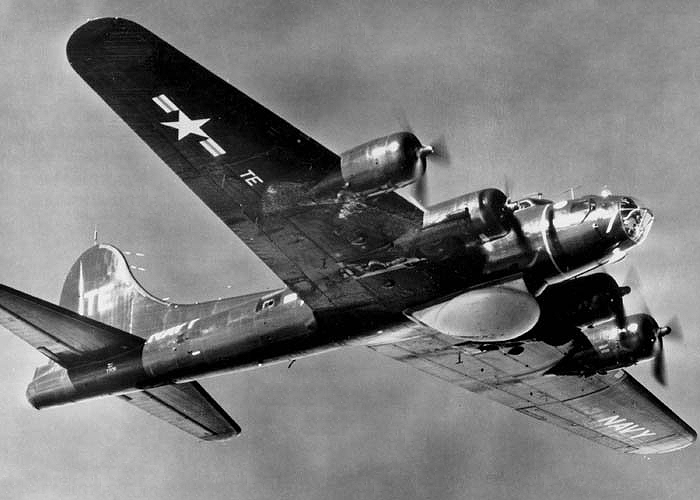
Under project Cadillac II, an AN/APS-20 radar was fitted onto the B-17G, making the PB-1W one of the first Airborne early warning aircraft.

During the last year of World War II and shortly thereafter, the United States Navy (USN) acquired 48 ex-USAAF B-17s for patrol and air-sea rescue work. The first two ex-USAAF B-17s, a B-17F (later modified to B-17G standard) and a B-17G were obtained by the Navy for various development programs. At first, these aircraft operated under their original USAAF designations, but on 31 July 1945 they were assigned the naval aircraft designation PB-1, a designation which had originally been used in 1925 for the Boeing Model 50 experimental flying boat.

Thirty-two B-17Gs were used by the Navy under the designation PB-1W, the suffix -W indicating an airborne early warning role. A large radome for an S-band AN/APS-20 search radar was fitted underneath the fuselage and additional internal fuel tanks were added for longer range, with the provision for additional underwing fuel tanks. Originally, the B-17 was also chosen because of its heavy defensive armament, but this was later removed. These aircraft were painted dark blue, the standard Navy paint scheme which had been adopted in late 1944. PB-1Ws continued in USN service until 1955, gradually being phased out in favor of the Lockheed WV-2 (known in the USAF as the EC-121, a designation adopted by the USN in 1962), a military version of the Lockheed 1049 Constellation commercial airliner.

In July 1945, 16 B-17s were transferred to the Coast Guard via the Navy; these aircraft were initially assigned US Navy Bureau Numbers (BuNo), but were delivered to the Coast Guard designated as PB-1Gs beginning in July 1946. Coast Guard PB-1Gs were stationed at a number of bases in the US and Newfoundland, with five at Coast Guard Air Station Elizabeth City, North Carolina, two at CGAS San Francisco, two at NAS Argentia, Newfoundland, one at CGAS Kodiak, Alaska, and one in Washington state. They were used primarily in the "Dumbo" air-sea rescue role, but were also used for iceberg patrol duties and for photo mapping. The Coast Guard PB-1Gs served throughout the 1950s, the last example not being withdrawn from service until 14 October 1959.

=== Special operations ===
B-17s were used by the CIA front companies Civil Air Transport, Air America and Intermountain Aviation for special missions. These included B-17G 44-85531, registered as N809Z. These aircraft were primarily used for agent drop missions over the People's Republic of China, flying from Taiwan, with Taiwanese crews. Four B-17s were shot down in these operations.

In 1957 the surviving B-17s had been stripped of all weapons and painted black. One of these Taiwan-based B-17s was flown to Clark Air Base in the Philippines in mid-September, assigned for covert missions into Tibet.

On 28 May 1962, N809Z, piloted by Connie Seigrist and Douglas Price, flew Major James Smith, USAF and Lieutenant Leonard A. LeSchack, USNR to the abandoned Soviet arctic ice station NP 8, as Operation Coldfeet. Smith and LeSchack parachuted from the B-17 and searched the station for several days. On 1 June, Seigrist and Price returned and picked up Smith and LeSchack using a Fulton Skyhook system installed on the B-17. N809Z was used to perform a Skyhook pick up in the James Bond movie Thunderball in 1965. This aircraft, now restored to its original B-17G configuration, was on display in the Evergreen Aviation & Space Museum in McMinnville, Oregon until it was sold to the Collings Foundation in 2015.

== Operators ==
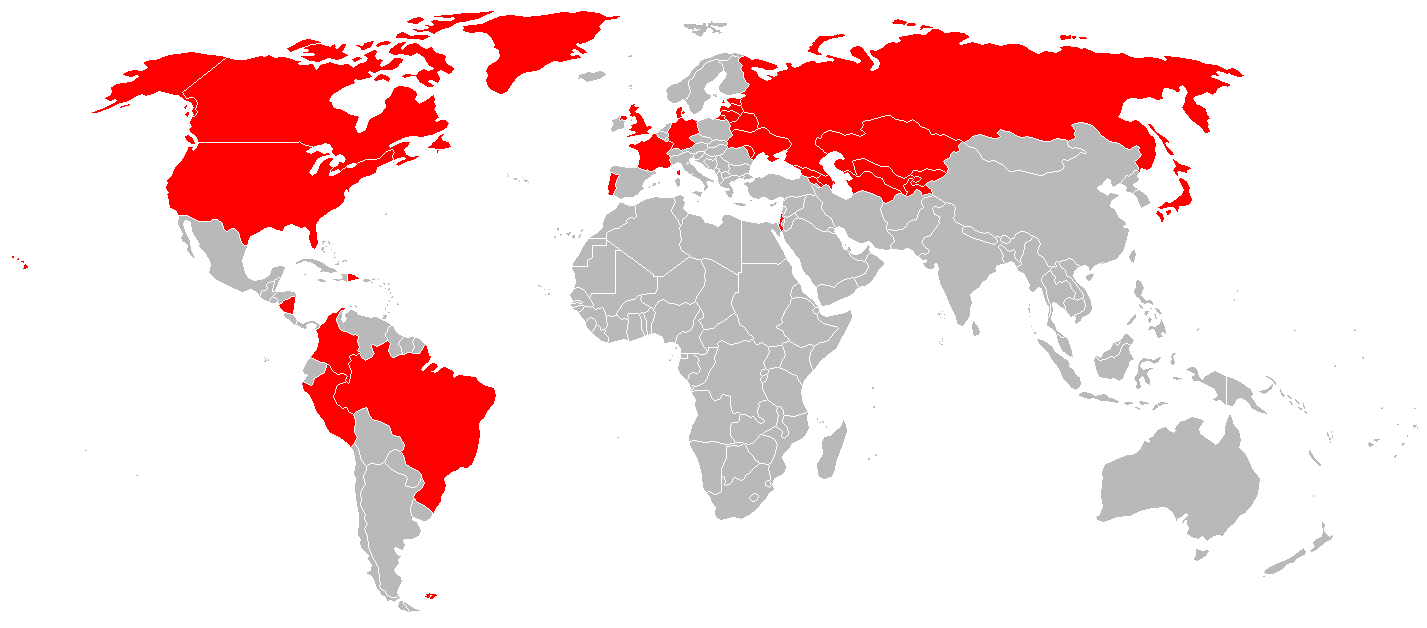
Military operators of the B-17

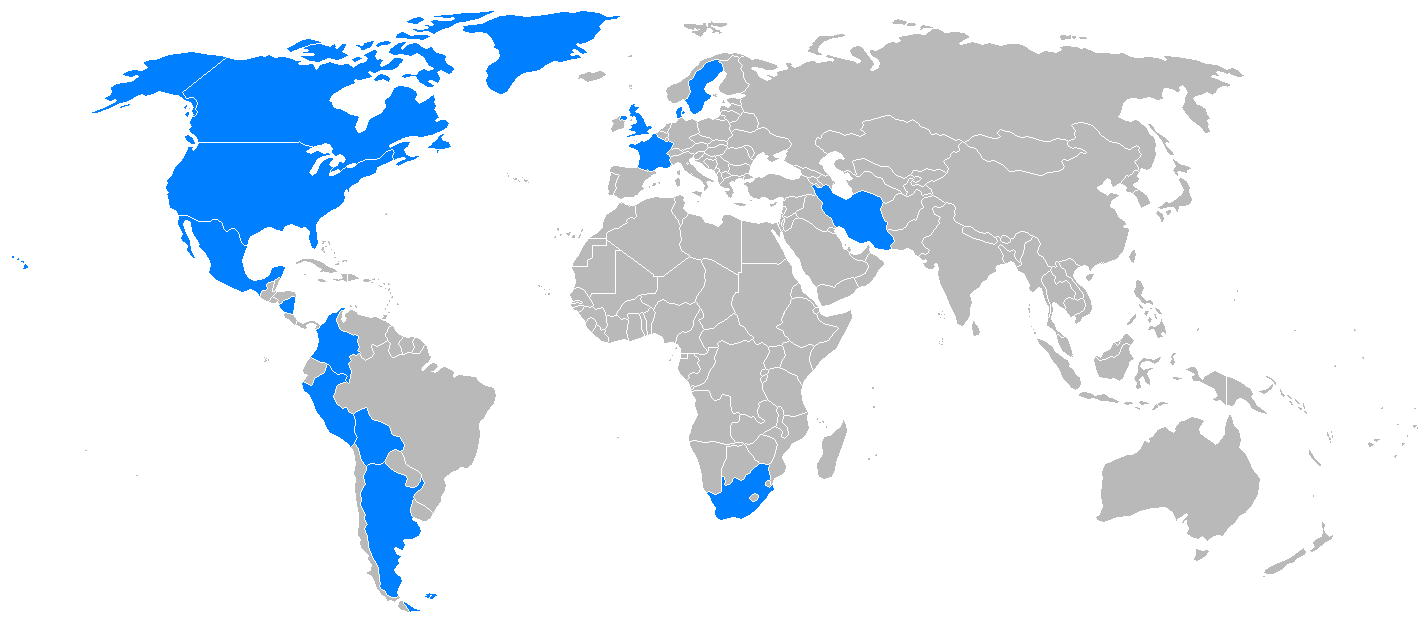
Civil operators of the B-17

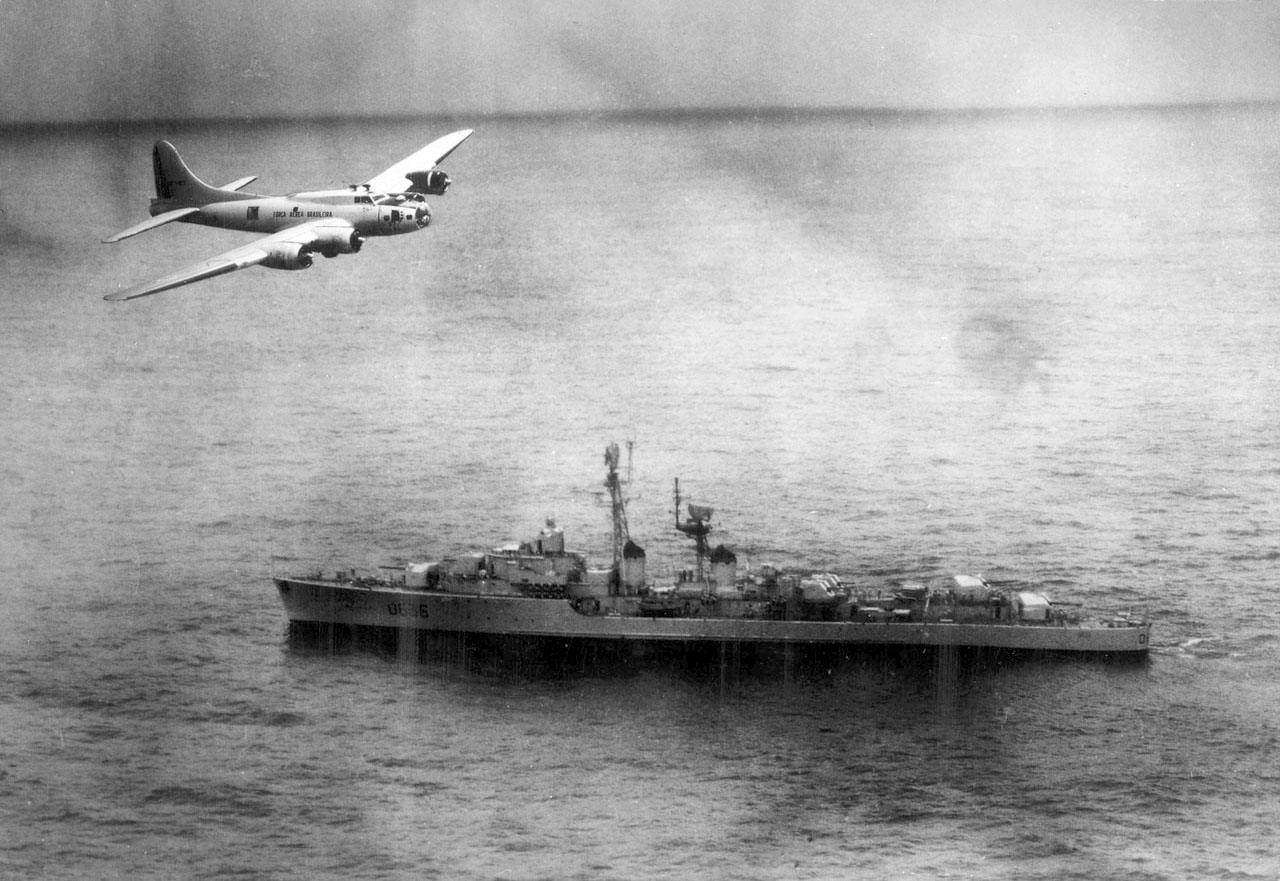
A Brazilian B-17 in action during the 1963 Lobster War

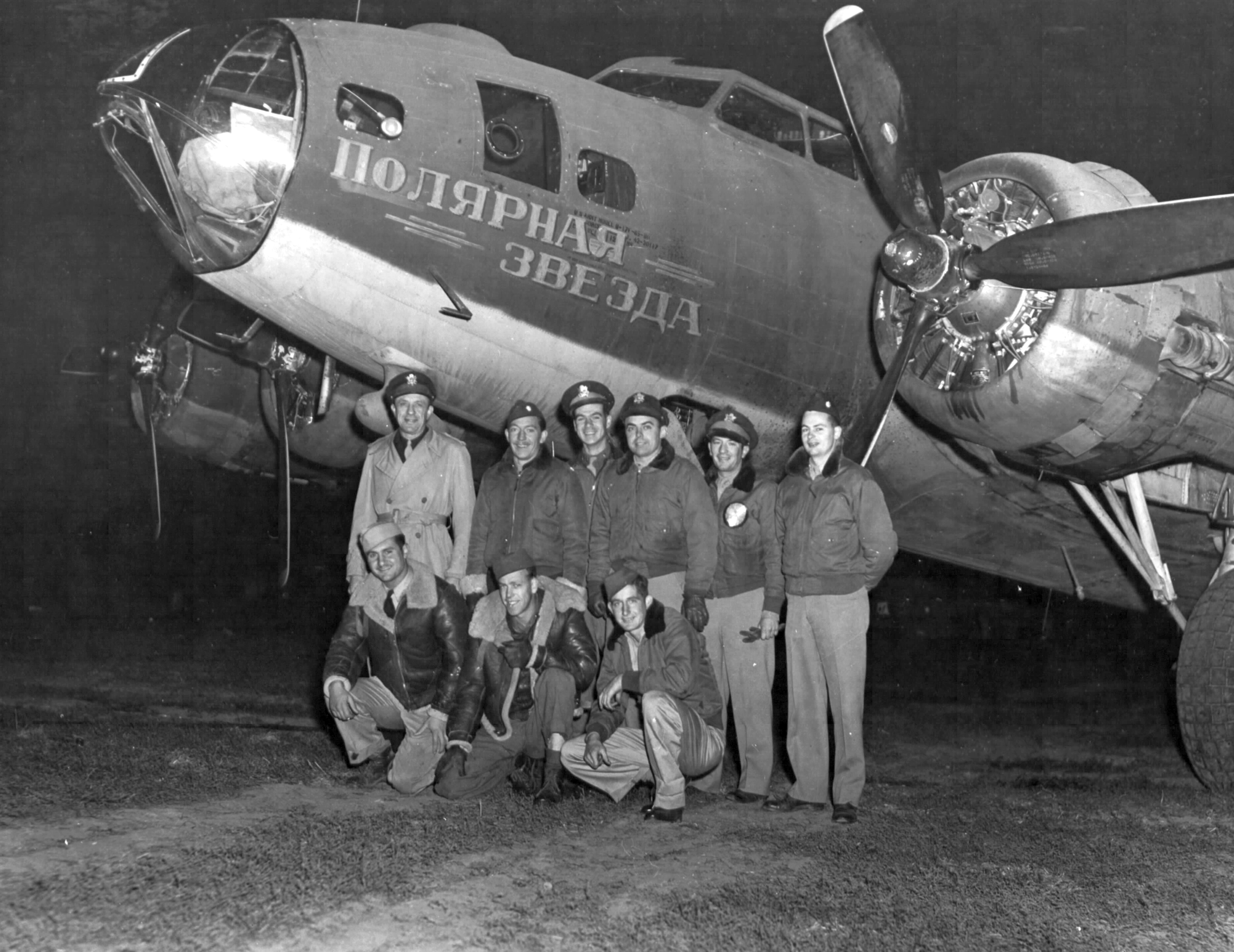
A B-17 crew participating in shuttle flights of Operation Frantic poses with their plane. The nose art on the bomber reads "Polar Star" (referring to the star (Polaris) in Russian.

The B-17, a versatile aircraft, served in dozens of USAAF units in theaters of combat throughout World War II, and in other roles for the RAF. Its main use was in Europe, where its shorter range and smaller bombload relative to other aircraft did not hamper it as much as in the Pacific Theater. Peak USAAF inventory (in August 1944) was 4,574 worldwide.

- Argentina
- Bolivia
- Brazil
- Canada
- Colombia
- Denmark
- Dominican Republic
- France
- Germany
- Iran
- Israel
- Japan
- Mexico
- Nicaragua
- Peru
- Portugal
- South Africa
- Republic of China
- Soviet Union
- Sweden
- Switzerland
- United Kingdom
- United States

== Surviving aircraft and wrecks ==
Of the more than 12,000 B-17s made, four were known to be in flying as of January 2025. There are about 40 B-17s in collections in the United States, and overall about 46 globally.

There are also nearly complete or partially complete B-17 wrecks that have been discovered: an example of this is a B-17F that ditched in the Pacific on 11 July 1943, but was located in 1986. Its name was "Black Jack".

== Fortresses as a symbol ==
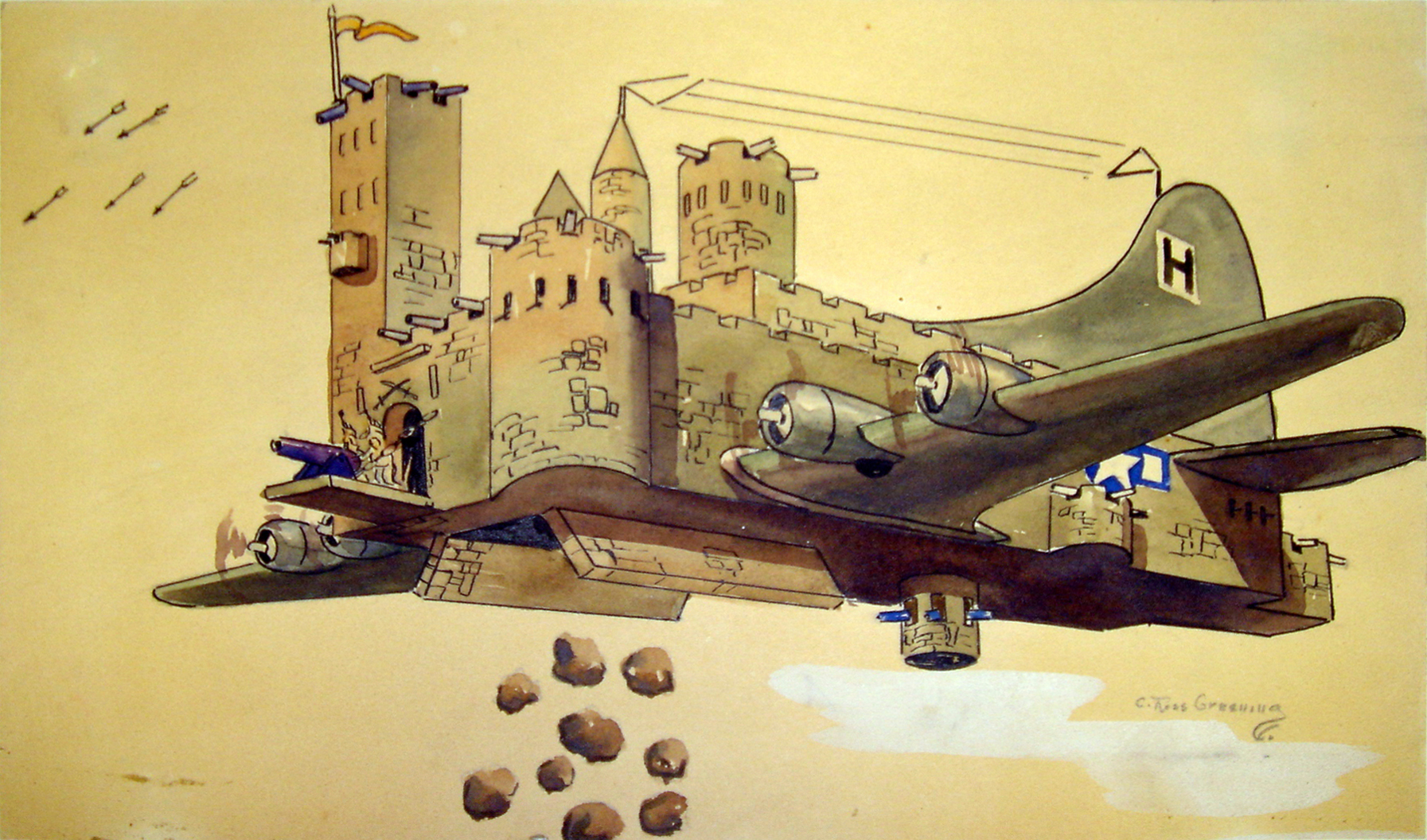
The B-17's capacity to repel enemy attacks and still inflict heavy damage upon German military capability and production centers is rendered in this caricature.

The B-17 Flying Fortress became symbolic of the United States of America's air power. In a 1943 Consolidated Aircraft poll of 2,500 men in cities where Consolidated advertisements had been run in newspapers, 73% had heard of the B-24 and 90% knew of the B-17.

After the first Y1B-17s were delivered to the Army Air Corps 2nd Bombardment Group, they were used on flights to promote their long range and navigational capabilities. In January 1938, group commander Colonel Robert Olds flew a Y1B-17 from the US east coast to the west coast, setting a transcontinental record of 13 hours 27 minutes. He also broke the west-to-east coast record on the return trip, averaging 245 mph (394 km/h) in 11 hours 1 minute. Six bombers of the 2nd Bombardment Group took off from Langley Field on 15 February 1938 as part of a goodwill flight to Buenos Aires, Argentina. Covering 12,000 miles (19,000 km) they returned on 27 February, with seven aircraft setting off on a flight to Rio de Janeiro, Brazil, three days later. In a well-publicized mission on 12 May of the same year, three Y1B-17s "intercepted" and took photographs of the Italian ocean liner SS Rex 610 miles (980 km) off the Atlantic coast. (Note: This is a commonly misreported error. The Rex was 725 miles offshore on her last position report as the Y1B-17s were taxiing for takeoff from Mitchel Field, four hours before interception)

Many pilots who flew both the B-17 and the B-24 preferred the B-17 for its greater stability and ease in formation flying. The electrical systems were less vulnerable to damage than the B-24's hydraulics, and the B-17 was easier to fly than a B-24 when missing an engine. During the war, the largest offensive bombing force, the Eighth Air Force, had an open preference for the B-17. Lieutenant General Jimmy Doolittle wrote about his preference for equipping the Eighth with B-17s, citing the logistical advantage in keeping field forces down to a minimum number of aircraft types with their individual servicing and spares. For this reason, he wanted B-17 bombers and P-51 fighters for the Eighth. His views were supported by Eighth Air Force statisticians, whose mission studies showed that the Flying Fortress's utility and survivability was much greater than those of the B-24 Liberator. Making it back to base on numerous occasions, despite extensive battle damage, the B-17's durability became legendary; stories and photos of B-17s surviving battle damage were widely circulated during the war. Despite an inferior performance and smaller bombload than the more numerous B-24 Liberators, a survey of Eighth Air Force crews showed a much higher rate of satisfaction with the B-17.

== Notable B-17s ==
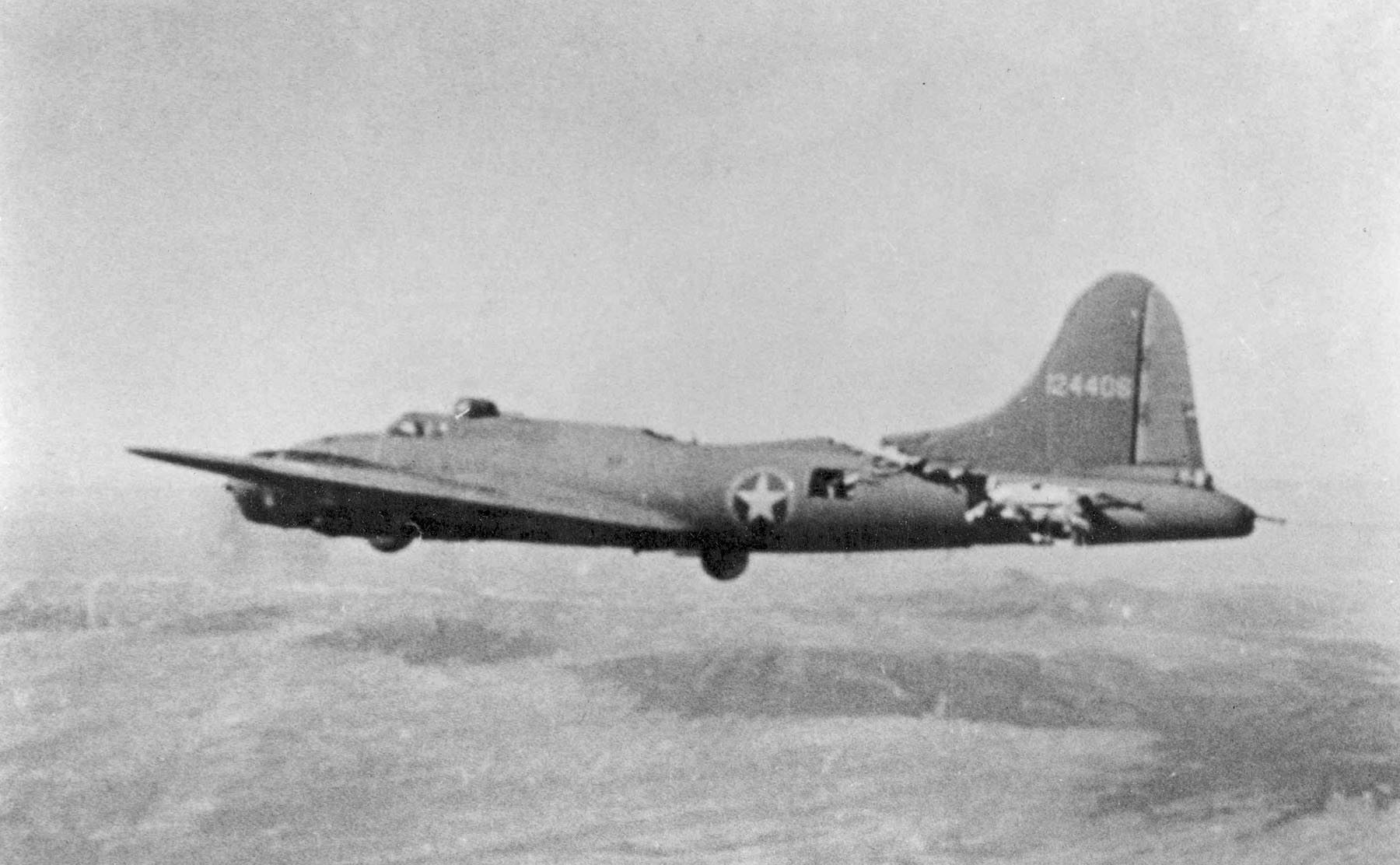
The severely damaged All American continues to fly after collision with an attacking Bf 109 fighter, eventually landing without crew injuries.

- Rikki Tikki Tavi – this B-17F had its tail section cut off by flak with tail gunner Eugene 'Gene' Moran still trapped inside, Moran survived the fall when the broken-off tail got snagged in a tree and was later captured by German forces. Apart from the navigator, everybody else in the forward fuselage died when it crashed
- All American – This B-17F survived having its tail almost cut off in a mid-air collision with a Bf 109 over Tunisia but returned safely to base in Algeria.
- Snap! Crackle! Pop! – B-17F-27-BO, 41-24620, part of the 360th Bomb Squadron, 303rd Bomb Group, was on a daylight bombing run over Saint-Nazaire, France when downed by flak. The ball turret gunner, Alan Magee, his parachute damaged and unusable, free fell from 22,000 feet, survived and became a POW.
- Chief Seattle – B-17E , 41-2656, sponsored by the city of Seattle, she disappeared (MIA) on 14 August 1942 flying a recon mission for the 19th BG, 435th BS and the crew declared dead on 7 December 1945.
- Hell's Kitchen – B-17F 41-24392 was one of only three early B-17F's in 414th BS to complete more than 100 combat missions.
- Mary Ann – a fictional B-17D that was part of an unarmed flight which left Hamilton Air Field, Novato, California on 6 December 1941 en route to Hickam Field in Hawaii, arriving during the attack on Pearl Harbor. The plane and its crew were immediately forced into action on Wake Island and in the Philippines during the outbreak of World War II. The aircraft became famous when its fictional exploits were featured in Air Force, one of the first of the patriotic war films released in 1943.
- Memphis Belle – one of the first B-17s to complete a tour of duty of 25 missions in the 8th Air Force and the subject of a feature film, now completely restored and on display since 17 May 2018 at the National Museum of the U.S. Air Force at Wright-Patterson AFB in Dayton, Ohio.
- Milk Wagon – A B-17G that, over the course of its tour of duty, set a record in the 3rd Division, possibly in the war, for 129 missions without aborting for mechanical failure.
- Miss Every Morning Fix'n – B-17C. Previously named 'Pamela'. Stationed in Mackay, Queensland, Australia during World War II. On 14 June 1943, crashed shortly after takeoff from Mackay while ferrying U.S. forces personnel back to Port Moresby, with 40 of the 41 people on board killed. It remains the worst air disaster in Australian history. The sole survivor, Foye Roberts, married an Australian and returned to the States. He died in Wichita Falls, Texas, on 4 February 2004.
- Murder Inc. – A B-17 bombardier wearing the name of the B-17 "Murder Inc." on his jacket was used for propaganda in German newspapers.
- Old 666 – B-17E flown by the most highly decorated crew in the Pacific Theater. It was heavily modified by the crew, with several additional machine guns.
- Royal Flush – B-17F 42-6087 from the 100th Bomb Group and commanded on one mission by highly decorated USAAF officer Robert Rosenthal, she was the lone surviving 100th BG B-17 of 10 October 1943 raid against Münster to return to the unit's base at RAF Thorpe Abbotts.
- Sir Baboon McGoon – B-17F featured in the June 1944 issue of Popular Science magazine and the 1945 issue of Flying magazine. Articles discuss mobile recovery crews following October 1943 belly landing at Tannington, England.
- The Swoose – Initially nicknamed Ole Betsy while in service, The Swoose is the only remaining intact B-17D, built in 1940, the oldest surviving Flying Fortress, and the only surviving B-17 to have seen action in the Philippines campaign (1941–1942); she is in the collection of the National Air and Space Museum and is being restored for final display at the National Museum of the US Air Force at Wright-Patterson AFB in Dayton, Ohio. The Swoose was flown by Frank Kurtz, father of actress Swoosie Kurtz, who named his daughter after the bomber.
- Ye Olde Pub – A highly damaged B-17 piloted by Charlie Brown that was not shot down by Franz Stigler, as memorialized in the painting A Higher Call by John D. Shaw.
- 5 Grand – 5,000th B-17 made, emblazoned with Boeing employee signatures, served with the 333rd Bomb Squadron, 96th Bomb Group in Europe. Damaged and repaired after gear-up landing, transferred to 388th Bomb Group. Returned from duty following V-E Day, flown for war bonds tour, then stored at Kingman, Arizona. Following an unsuccessful bid for museum preservation, the aircraft was scrapped.
- Battle Queen - Peg Of My Heart – B-17 F-95-BO, serial number 42-30315, designation: S230315, Eighth Air Force, 390th Bomb Group, 569th Squadron. On August 17, 1943, beginning at 08:35 a.m. (UTC), 127 bombers from the 4th Bomb Wing of the Eighth Air Force took off from the British base at Framlingham to carry out an attack on the Messerschmitt factories in Regensburg, Germany. During such operations into the heart of Germany, Allied aircraft were exposed to German air defense not only during the attack but also on their return to England. That is why, for this mission, the decision was made to cross the Alps and land at the Bizerte-Sidi Ahmed Air Base in Tunisia. That alone was a rather risky undertaking due to range limitations, not to mention for aircraft that had been hit and, for example, lost fuel. The Battle Queen was one of these aircraft that was severely damaged. The pilots decided to land in neutral Switzerland and broke away from the rest of the group. Near the village of Utzenstorf in the Swiss Canton of Bern, the pilot made a belly landing in a potato field at 1:45 p.m. (UTC+1). The crew survived unharmed, as did a farmer who was working in the field; she threw herself to the ground and pulled the basket over her head, survived the landing, and later crawled out from under one of the wings. The Battle Queen was recovered by the Swiss Army, examined, and later scrapped. The crew was interned in Switzerland at the Bernese Oberland tourist resort of Adelboden. It was the first emergency landing of an Allied B-17 bomber in neutral Switzerland. Pilot: 1st Lt. Stephen P. Rapport, Jr.; Co-pilot: 2nd Lt. Elmer R. Holloway; Navigator: 2nd Lt. Grover D. Boyd, Jr.; Bombardier: 2nd Lt. Charles O. Ryan; Engineer: S/Sgt. John Scott; Radio: S/Sgt. William R. Carter; Ball Turret: S/Sgt. Theodore P. Obsharsky; Right Waist: Sgt. Joseph W. Russell; Left Waist: S/Sgt. Blair C. Neal; Tail Gunner: Sgt. Ricardo Robledo

== Accidents and incidents ==
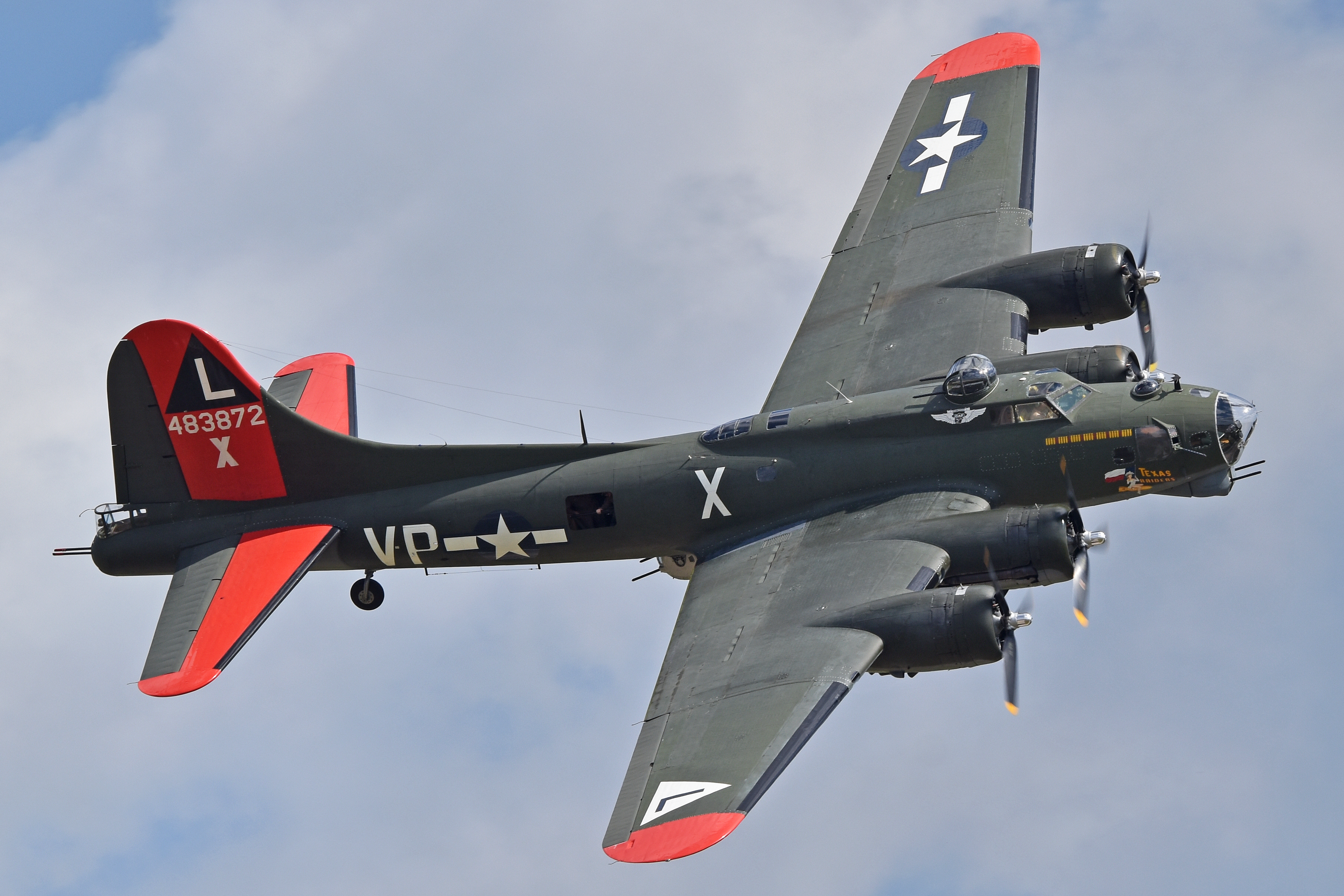
The B-17G Texas Raider that was lost 2022, shown here in 2019. It was destroyed in a mid-air collision at an air show. (see 2022 Dallas air show mid-air collision)

Most of the losses were during WWII, however because of the Warbird flights there have been losses through the 2020s as well.

== Noted B-17 pilots and crew members ==
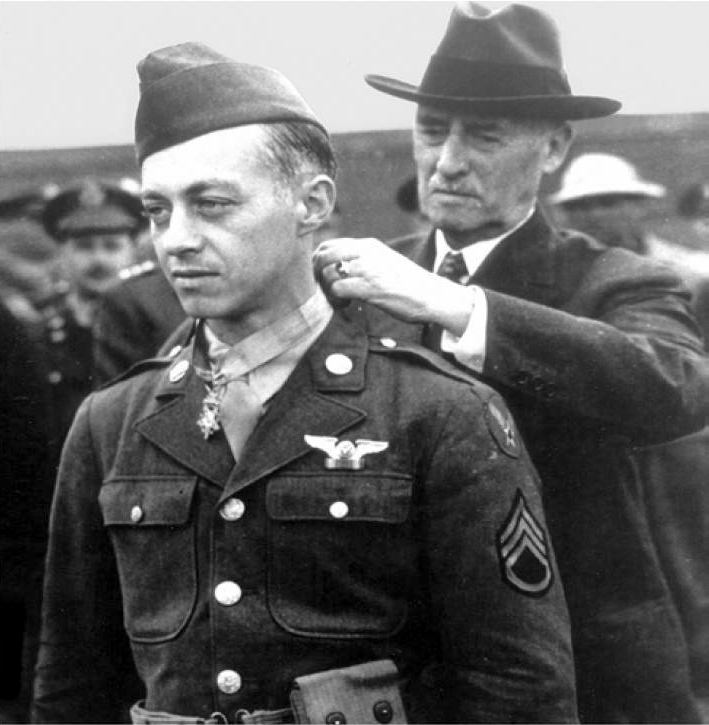
Maynard H. Smith receiving Medal of Honor from Secretary of War Henry L. Stimson

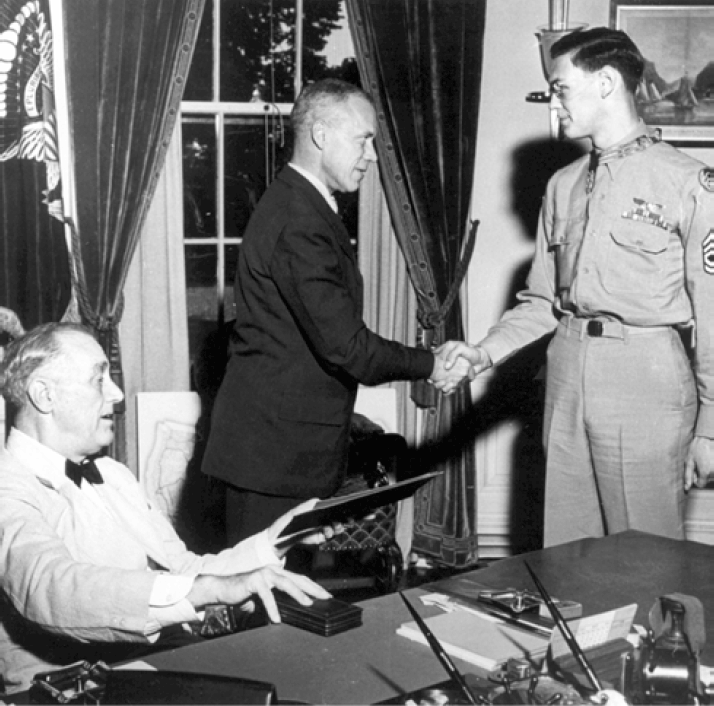
Forrest L. Vosler receiving Medal of Honor from President Roosevelt

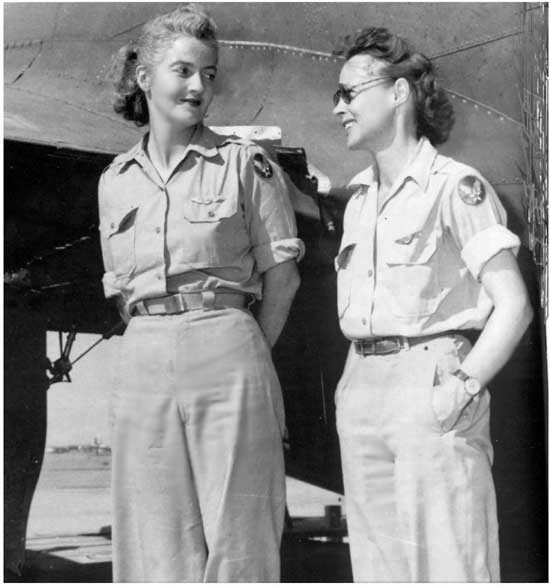
L–R, Nancy Love, pilot and Betty (Huyler) Gillies, co-pilot, the first women to fly the Boeing B-17 Flying Fortress heavy bomber for the WASP

=== Medal of Honor recipients ===
Many B-17 crew members received military honors and 17 received the Medal of Honor, the highest military decoration awarded by the United States:

- Brigadier General Frederick Castle (flying as co-pilot) – awarded posthumously for remaining at controls so others could escape damaged aircraft.
- 2nd Lt Robert Femoyer (navigator) – awarded posthumously
- 1st Lt Donald J. Gott (pilot) – awarded posthumously
- 2nd Lt David R. Kingsley (bombardier) – awarded posthumously for tending to injured crew and giving up his parachute to another
- 1st Lt William R. Lawley Jr. – "heroism and exceptional flying skill"
- Sgt Archibald Mathies (engineer-gunner) – awarded posthumously
- 1st Lt Jack W. Mathis (bombardier) – posthumously, the first airman in the European theater to be awarded the Medal of Honor
- 2nd Lt William E. Metzger Jr. (co-pilot) – awarded posthumously
- 1st Lt Edward Michael
- 1st Lt John C. Morgan
- Capt Harl Pease (awarded posthumously)
- 2nd Lt Joseph Sarnoski (awarded posthumously)
- S/Sgt Maynard H. Smith (gunner)
- 1st Lt Walter E. Truemper (awarded posthumously)
- T/Sgt Forrest L. Vosler (radio operator)
- Brigadier General Kenneth Walker Commanding officer of V Bomber Command, killed while leading small force in raid on Rabaul – awarded posthumously
- Maj Jay Zeamer Jr. (pilot) – earned on unescorted reconnaissance mission in Pacific, same mission as Sarnoski

=== Other military achievements or events ===
- Lincoln Broyhill (1925–2008), tail-gunner on a B-17 in the 483rd Bombardment Group. He received a Distinguished Unit Citation and set two individual records in a single day: (1) most German jets destroyed by a single gunner in one mission (two), and (2) most German jets destroyed by a single gunner during the entirety of World War II.
- Allison C. Brooks (1917–2006), a B-17 pilot who was awarded numerous military decorations and was ultimately promoted to the rank of major general and served in active duty until 1971.
- 1st Lt Eugene Emond (1921–1998): Lead pilot for Man O War II Horsepower Limited. Received the Distinguished Flying Cross, Air Medal with three oak leaf clusters, American Theater Ribbon and Victory Ribbon. Was part of D-Day and witnessed one of the first German jets when a Me 262A-1a flew through his formation over Germany. One of the youngest bomber pilots in the US Army Air Forces.
- Immanuel J. Klette (1918–1988): Second-generation German-American whose 91 combat missions were the most flown by any Eighth Air Force pilot in World War II.
- Capt Colin Kelly (1915–1941): Pilot of the first US B-17 lost in action.
- Col Frank Kurtz (1911–1996): The USAAF's most decorated pilot of World War II. Commander of the 463rd Bombardment Group (Heavy), 15th Air Force, Celone Field, Foggia, Italy. Clark Field Philippines attack survivor. Olympic bronze medalist in diving (1932), 1944–1945. Father of actress Swoosie Kurtz, herself named for the still-surviving B-17D mentioned above.
- Gen Curtis LeMay (1906–1990): Became head of the Strategic Air Command and Chief of Staff of the USAF.
- Lt Col Nancy Love (1914–1976) and Betty (Huyler) Gillies (1908–1998): The first women pilots to be certified to fly the B-17, in 1943 and to qualify for the Women's Auxiliary Ferrying Squadron.
- SSgt Alan Magee (1919–2003): B-17 gunner who on 3 January 1943 survived a 22,000-foot (6,700-meter) freefall after his aircraft was shot down by the Luftwaffe over St. Nazaire.
- Col Robert K. Morgan (1918–2004): Pilot of Memphis Belle.
- Lt Col Robert Rosenthal (1917–2007): Commanded the only surviving B-17, Royal Flush, of a US 8th Air Force raid by the 100th Bomb Group on Münster on 10 October 1943. Completed 53 missions. Earned sixteen medals for gallantry (including one each from Britain and France), and led the raid on Berlin on 3 February 1945, that is likely to have ended the life of Roland Freisler, the infamous "hanging judge" of the People's Court.

== Specifications (B-17G) ==
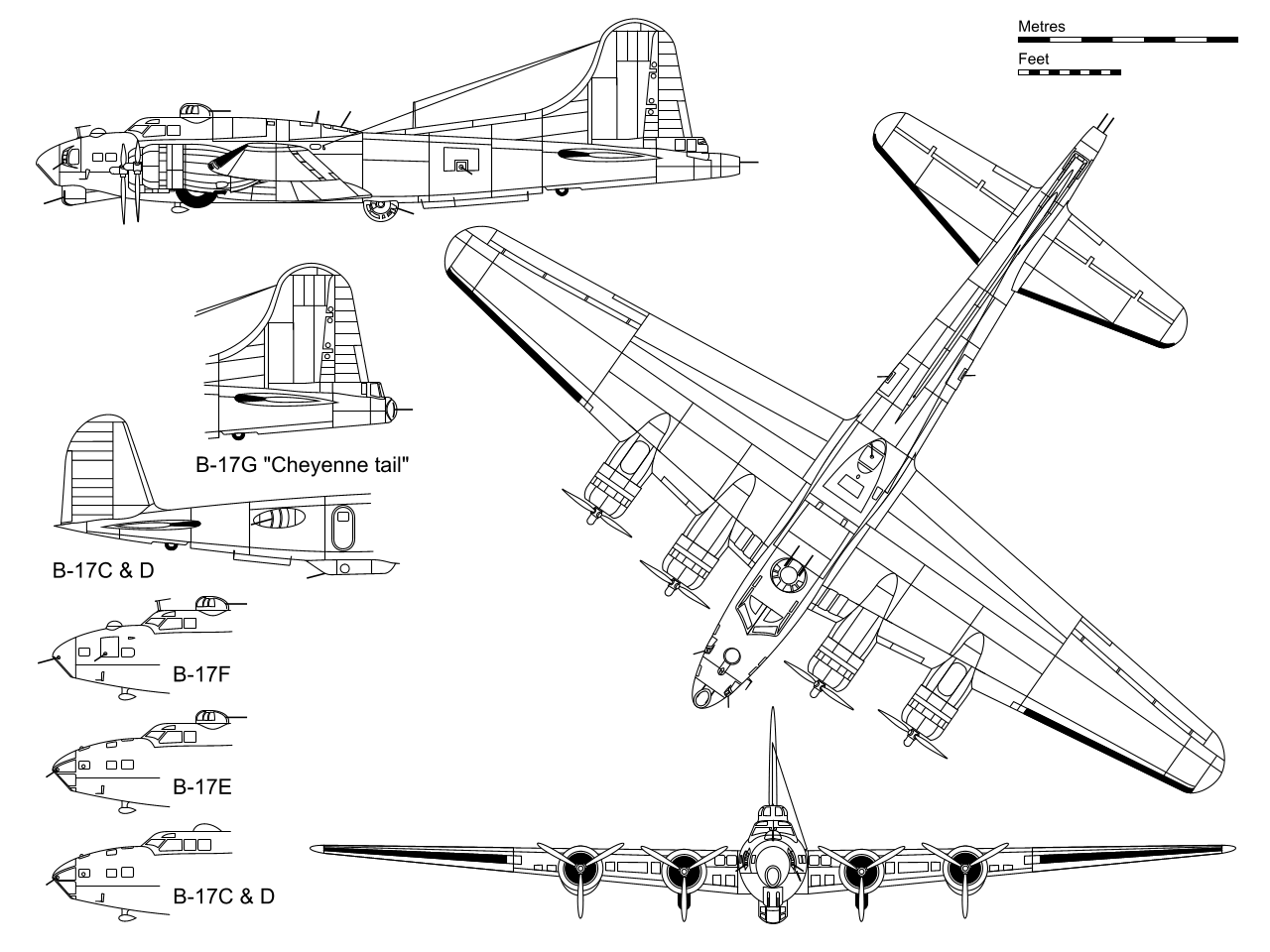
3-view projection of a B-17G, with inset detail showing the "Cheyenne tail" and some major differences with other B-17 variants

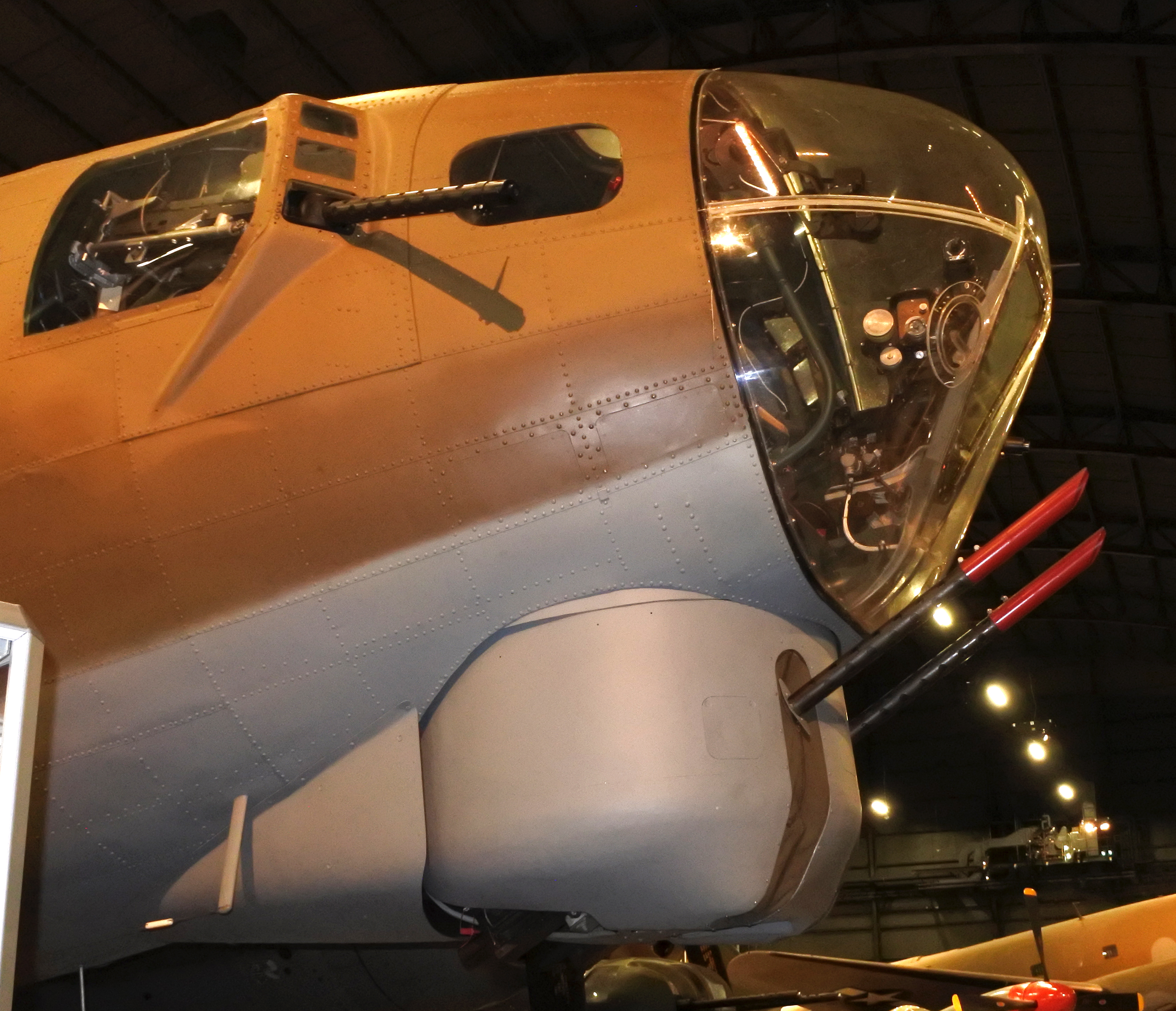
B-17G nose guns

Data from The Encyclopedia of World Aircraft JANE'S Fighting Aircraft of World War II

General characteristics

- Crew: 10: Pilot, co-pilot, navigator, bombardier/nose gunner, flight engineer/top turret gunner, radio operator, waist gunners (2), ball turret gunner, tail gunner
- Length: 74 ft 4 in (22.66 m) Length of B-17G is disputed between multiple reliable sources: alternate sources place length at 74 ft 9 in (22.78 m)
- Wingspan: 103 ft 9 in (31.62 m)
- Height: 19 ft 1 in (5.82 m)
- Wing area: 1,420 sq ft (131.92 m^{2})
- Airfoil: NACA 0018 / NACA 0010
- Empty weight: 36,135 lb (16,391 kg)
- Gross weight: 54,000 lb (24,500 kg)
- Max takeoff weight: 65,500 lb (29,700 kg)
- Aspect ratio: 7.57
- Powerplant: 4 × Wright R-1820-97 "Cyclone" turbosupercharged radial engines, 1,200 hp (895 kW) each
- Propellers: 3-bladed Hamilton-Standard constant-speed propeller

Performance

- Maximum speed: 295 mph (472 km/h, 256.34 kn) (At 25,000 feet or 7,600 meters)
- Cruise speed: 182 mph (293 km/h, 158 kn)
- Range: 2,000 mi (3,219 km, 1,738 nmi) with 6,000 lb (2,700 kg) bombload
- Combat range: 1,100 mi (1,760 km, 960 nmi) (maximum bomb load, average fuel)
- Ferry range: 3,750 mi (6,040 km, 3,260 nmi)
- Service ceiling: 35,600 ft (10,850 m)
- Rate of climb: 900 ft/min (4.6 m/s)
- Time to altitude: 41 minutes to 25,000 ft (7,600 m).
- Wing loading: 38.0 lb/sq ft (185.7 kg/m^{2})
- Power/mass: 0.089 hp/lb (150 W/kg)

Armament

- Guns: 13 × 0.50 in (12.7 mm) M2 Browning machine guns in 9 positions (2 in the Bendix chin turret, 2 on nose cheeks, 2 staggered waist guns, 2 in upper Sperry turret, 2 in Sperry ball turret in belly, 2 in the tail and 1 firing upwards from radio compartment behind bomb bay)
- Bombs:
  - Short range missions; internal load only (less than 400 mi or 640 km): 8,000 lb (3,600 kg)
  - Long range missions; internal load only (around 800 mi or 1,300 km): 4,500 lb (2,000 kg)
  - Max internal and external load: 17,600 lb (8,000 kg)

== Notable appearances in media ==
A Douglas Aircraft B-17 assembly line is featured in the 1944 drama An American Romance. Hollywood featured the B-17 in its period films, such as director Howard Hawks' Air Force starring John Garfield and Twelve O'Clock High starring Gregory Peck. Both films were made with the full cooperation of the United States Army Air Forces and used USAAF aircraft and (for Twelve O'Clock High) combat footage. In 1964, the latter film was made into a television show of the same name and ran for three years on ABC TV. Footage from Twelve O' Clock High was also used, along with three restored B-17s, in the 1962 film The War Lover. An early model YB-17 also appeared in the 1938 film Test Pilot with Clark Gable and Spencer Tracy, and later with Clark Gable in Command Decision in 1948, in Tora! Tora! Tora! in 1970, and in Memphis Belle with Matthew Modine, Eric Stoltz, Billy Zane, and Harry Connick Jr. in 1990. The most famous B-17, the Memphis Belle, toured the US with her crew to reinforce national morale (and to sell war bonds). She was featured in a USAAF documentary, Memphis Belle: A Story of a Flying Fortress.

The Flying Fortress has also been featured in artistic works expressing the physical and psychological stress of the combat conditions and the high casualty rates that crews suffered. Works such as The Death of the Ball Turret Gunner by Randall Jarrell and Heavy Metal's section "B-17" depict the nature of these missions. The Ball turret itself has inspired works like Steven Spielberg's The Mission. Artists who served on the bomber units also created paintings and drawings depicting the combat conditions in World War II. Masters of the Air, a 2024 American war drama television miniseries created by John Shiban and John Orloff, based on the 2007 book Masters of the Air: America's Bomber Boys Who Fought the Air War Against Nazi Germany by Donald L. Miller, follows the actions of the 100th Bomb Group, a B-17 unit in eastern England during World War II.

== See also ==
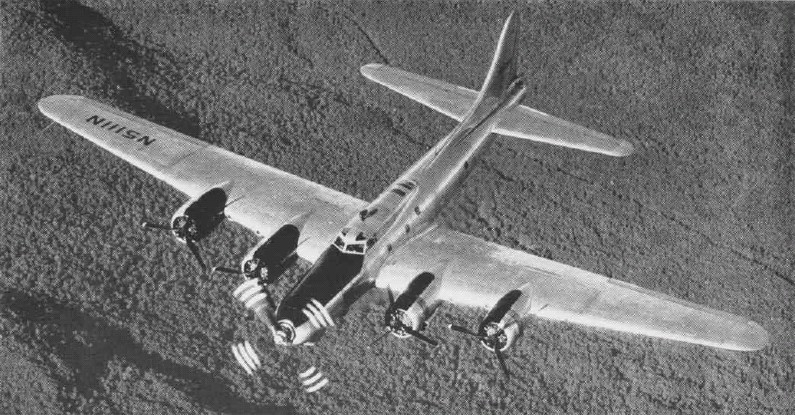
B-17 modified for testing of the XT-34 turboprop. When testing concluded, the aircraft was restored to stock configuration as the "Liberty Belle", but was lost in a post–forced-landing fire near Oswego, Illinois, on 13 June 2011.

- Air warfare of World War II
- Boeing B-17 Flying Fortress variants
- B-17 Flying Fortress units of the United States Army Air Forces
- Accidents and incidents involving the B-17 Flying Fortress

Related development

- Boeing XB-15
- Boeing XB-38 Flying Fortress
- Boeing YB-40 Flying Fortress
- Boeing C-108 Flying Fortress

Related lists

- List of bomber aircraft
- List of aircraft of World War II
- List of military aircraft of the United States
