= Shoo Shoo Baby =

Shoo Shoo Baby may refer to:

- Shoo-Shoo Baby (song), a song made popular by The Andrews Sisters
- Shoo Shoo Baby (aircraft), a restored World War II USAAF B-17G Flying Fortress bomber
