= The Swoose =

B-17D-BO Flying Fortress, oldest B-17 still intact

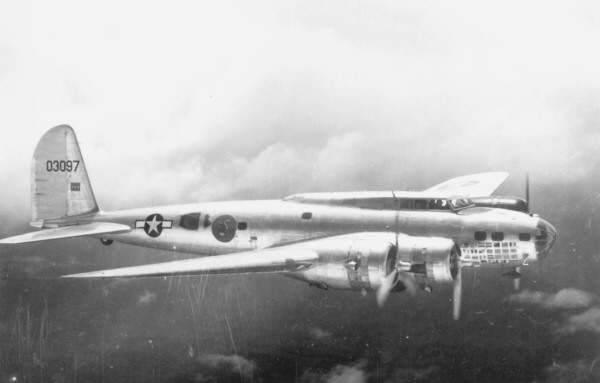
- The Swoose in bare metal finish, 1944

General information
- Type: Boeing B-17 Flying Fortress
- Manufacturer: Boeing Airplane Company
- Owners: USAF
- Serial: 40-3097

History
- In service: 25 April 1941 to February 1944
- Preserved at: Under restoration at the National Museum of the United States Air Force

The Swoose is a Boeing B-17D-BO Flying Fortress, USAAF serial number 40-3097, that saw extensive use in the Southwest Pacific theatre of World War II and survived to become the oldest B-17 still intact. It is the only early "shark fin"-tailed B-17 known to exist, and the only surviving B-17 to have seen action in the 1941–42 Philippines Campaign, operating on the first day of the United States' entry into the war. After that campaign it ended up in Australia and was used for VIP duties until its retirement from service. After the war it was rescued from being scrapped, eventually making its way into the hands of the National Museum of the United States Air Force, where it has undergone gradual restoration since 2008.

== Early history ==
The 38th of 42 B-17Ds built by Boeing, 40-3097 was accepted by the Army Air Corps on 25 April 1941 in Seattle, Washington. It was ferried to Hickam Field, Hawaii, 13–14 May 1941, by the 19th Bomb Group as part of a group of 21 B-17C and B-17Ds slated to equip the 11th Bomb Group.

In response to the perceived hostile activities of the Japanese military, in September 1941 the War Department sent nine B-17s with hand-picked crews from their base in Hawaii to Clark Field in the Philippines. These were assigned to the 14th Bombardment Squadron, detached from the 11th Bomb Group. B-17 40-3097, then designated aircraft number "21", arrived on 12 September in the midst of a typhoon at Nichols Field, (a fighter airfield just south of Manila and the only other than Clark among the Army's four active airfields that could handle the Fortresses). On 5 December the 14th Bomb Squadron was ordered, as a dispersal measure, to move its eight B-17s to the newly established Del Monte Airfield on the island of Mindanao, along with the eight B-17s of the 93rd Bomb Squadron.

Eight hours after the Pearl Harbor raid, the Japanese surprise attacks of 8 December 1941 on U.S. military installations in the Philippines caught much of the Far East Air Force on the ground; only 19 of the 35 Flying Fortresses in the Philippines escaped destruction or severe damage. The two squadrons sent to Del Monte, including 40-3097 (at that point named Ole Betsy), were pressed into bombing action for the next two months, as newer B-17Es began to be dispatched to the Pacific in January 1942. Spare parts were scarce and ground crews patched up battle damage with parts salvaged from other destroyed aircraft. The last combat mission flown by 40-3097 was a raid on the east coast of Borneo on 11 January 1942, piloted by the commander of the 19th Bomb Group, Major Cecil Combs.

== Half swan, half goose ==
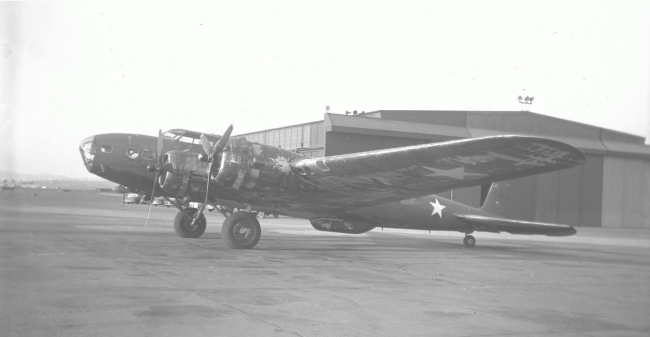
The Swoose at Hammer Field, Fresno, California

In late January 1942, 40-3097 was flown to a Royal Australian Air Force Base at Laverton, near Melbourne, Australia, where it underwent depot repairs. At this time, the tail of 40-3091 was grafted onto 40-3097, leading 19th Bomb Group pilot Captain Weldon Smith to dub the aircraft The Swoose after the popular song "Alexander the Swoose" written by Franklin Furlett and performed by bandleader Kay Kyser about a bird that was "half swan, half goose: Alexander is a swoose". A depiction of the chimerical bird was soon painted on the starboard fuselage, just aft of the main entrance door, with the statement "It Flys" [sic]. The B-17 never returned to first-line duty, flying navigation escort missions for fighters and anti-submarine patrols. The Swoose was withdrawn from duty in March 1942; by this time, it was in poor condition overall after so many logged flight hours.

== General's transport ==
While parked at Laverton, it was still deemed the most suitable aircraft available at the airfield, and was selected by Captain Frank Kurtz to serve as the personal transport for General George Brett, then the Deputy Commander of Allied Forces in Australia, and ranking American commander. It carried various military brass for the next four months, including future president Lyndon B. Johnson, then a congressman and active-duty US Navy lieutenant commander. On a flight from Darwin on 11 June 1942, the crew had navigation problems and Kurtz had to make a forced landing at Carisbrooke Station near Winton, Queensland. When General Brett was reassigned to the Caribbean Defense Command following friction between him and General Douglas MacArthur, The Swoose ferried him all the way to Washington, D.C., in August 1942, setting a number of speed records in the process. Used for a war bond tour, 40-3097 continued to serve as General Brett's personal transport through 1944.

In 1943, Harcourt Brace published the book Queens Die Proudly by William Lindsay White, a follow-up to White's earlier wartime best-seller, They Were Expendable. Queens Die Proudly is a journalistic account of the air war in the Philippines, the Netherlands East Indies, and Australia, from December 1941 through the spring of 1942; Captain Frank Kurtz and The Swoose are prominently featured.

== Upgrade ==
A routine inspection in February 1944 at Albrook Field in the Panama Canal Zone uncovered cracked wing spars and other corrosion. While this would normally result in an aircraft being scrapped, Brett's pilot at the time, Captain Jack Crane, located a pair of B-17B wing spar panels in the local air depot. The Swoose was rebuilt, including much of her on-board equipment being brought up to Boeing's B-17E standard, but without the "E" model's gun turret emplacements. The aircraft was redesignated an RB-17D in late 1944 ("R" for Restricted: no aerobatics, no passengers, or anything similar); it continued to be assigned to General Brett until December 1945, when the general himself flew the last operational flight of The Swoose from Los Angeles to Kirtland Field, Albuquerque, New Mexico, for recycling disposal.

== War memorial ==
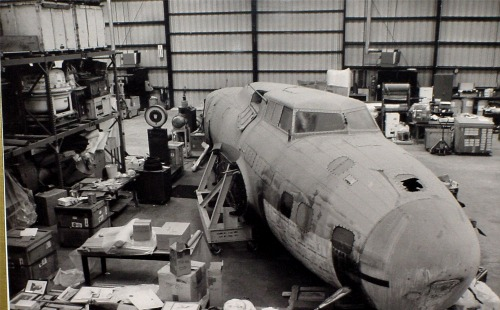
The Swoose disassembled at the Smithsonian

Like thousands of other B-17s, The Swoose was caught in the rush to disarm, ending up at the extensive War Assets Administration facility at Kingman, Arizona, slated to be melted down for its aluminium. At this point, March 1946, Colonel Frank Kurtz persuaded the City of Los Angeles to retrieve the bomber for use as a war memorial, with the bomber arriving at Los Angeles Municipal Airport on 6 April 1946. Kurtz piloted the aircraft on what was at the time described as her last flight. Three years later, however, the city still had not found an appropriate place to display the historic airframe, so in January 1949 it was donated by the city fathers to the National Air Museum in Washington, D.C. Refurbished at March Air Force Base, Riverside, California, for its delivery flight to Washington, it was flown by Kurtz with National Air Museum curator Paul E. Garber aboard to their storage facility at Park Ridge, Illinois, arriving on 26 March 1949. In January 1950 it was flown to Pyote Air Force Base, Pyote, Texas, for additional long-term storage, and again in December 1953 it was airborne one final time, flying to Andrews Air Force Base in Maryland, arriving there 5 December 1953 on just three engines.

== Deterioration ==
The Swoose was stored outside at Andrews until April 1961, during which time it suffered at the hands of both the weather and souvenir-seeking vandals. It was finally dismantled and moved several miles overland to the National Air and Space Museum's Paul E. Garber Restoration Facility in Suitland, Maryland, where it suffered additional weather damage while stored outside. Amidst mounting criticism about the treatment of historic artifacts like The Swoose and the B-29 Enola Gay, the Smithsonian finally moved 40-3097 indoors in a dismantled state in the mid-1970s.

== Move to Dayton ==
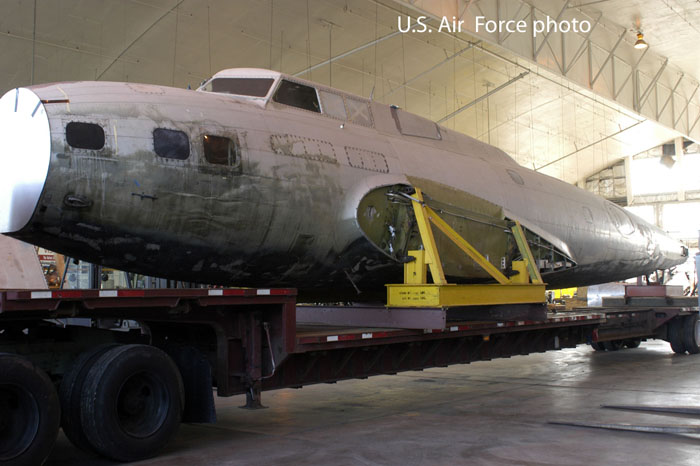
Stripped to its fuselage

The Washington Post reported on 3 November 2007 that the Air and Space Museum's collections committee, an advisory group on the acquisition and transfer of aircraft, had voted 5–4 on 28 September 2007 for deaccessioning The Swoose and transferring it to the National Museum of the United States Air Force in Dayton, Ohio. The panel forwarded its decision to Gen. John R. "Jack" Dailey, the museum director, and Donald S. Lopez Sr., the deputy director, who subsequently decided to stand by the committee's recommendation. "There were good arguments on both sides", said Dailey, who had requested a collections review to alleviate a storage crunch at the aforementioned Paul E. Garber Restoration Facility, where The Swoose had been in storage since 1961. The bomber had never been in a plan to be displayed, Dailey noted. A recommended condition of this transfer was that the National Museum of the United States Air Force transfer ownership of a restored B-17 to the National Air and Space Museum's Steven F. Udvar-Hazy Center annex for display, as that museum otherwise lacked a Boeing B-17. The matter was discussed by the governing board of the Dayton museum, and with the recent arrival of the B-17F Memphis Belle, it was decided that continued display of the museum's B-17G Shoo Shoo Shoo Baby would be unnecessary. Upon completion of the restoration and display of The Swoose, Shoo Shoo Baby will be transferred to the Washington D.C. museum for display. The historic Memphis Belle already had its restoration completed by late 2017, and it was placed on display indoors on 17 May 2018 at the NMUSAF.

Under restoration

On 15 July 2008 The Swoose was permanently transferred to the National Museum of the United States Air Force for restoration and display. It was placed in the museum's restoration facility alongside the Memphis Belle.

"We are pleased that The Swoose is coming to the National Museum of the U.S. Air Force," said senior curator Terry Aitken. "The transfer between the two federal institutions is a demonstration of good stewardship of our national historic collection. Our museum's restoration staff will use their experience and expertise being gained from the restoration of the famous Memphis Belle to accurately restore The Swoose, which is so important to our history".

As of fall 2008, the NMUSAF had begun restoration of the Swoose. The Swoose had undergone a limited inspection and a more extensive and detailed technical inspection is planned. Based on the findings, the museum will determine how best to restore and display this historic aircraft. The extensive restoration is expected to take a number of years. The Swoose is being restored at the same time as Memphis Belle, though it was originally expected The Swoose restoration will be completed many years before Memphis Belle.

The 2010 Annual Report, the USAF museum reported: "Work progressed on tail cone components, keel beam, main landing gear, forward fuselage, and lower belly machine gun. ..."

As of August 2012, the National Museum of the US Air Force website reported:

All items are in the process of being evaluated for restoration. The interior has been removed from the aircraft and the fuselage is being treated for corrosion control. Repair and fabrication of the nose compartment ring frames is nearing completion and skin is being done now. The aft tail cone is being treated for corrosion control by hand, and the radio room, waist gun position and tail cone are now being stripped. The cabin door has undergone sheet metal fabrication and repair. The corroded right longeron has been completed and the left one is being restored. The lower flexible machine gun emplacement has been fabricated and fitted to the aircraft by a contractor. Other parts are being machine fabricated by the volunteer machinists as needed. Miscellaneous parts are being inventoried and catalogued. Volunteers have restored the rudder and fabric covering has been completed.

As of 2019, restoration of The Swoose has been temporarily suspended to allow the NMUSAF's Restoration Division to focus on higher priority restoration projects.

By 2023, the aircraft had been laid out and the preservation/restoration process had resumed. At that time, completion was estimated to take up to seven years.

== See also ==
- Mizpah
- Old 666
