= Shoo Shoo Shoo Baby =

WWII American aircraft

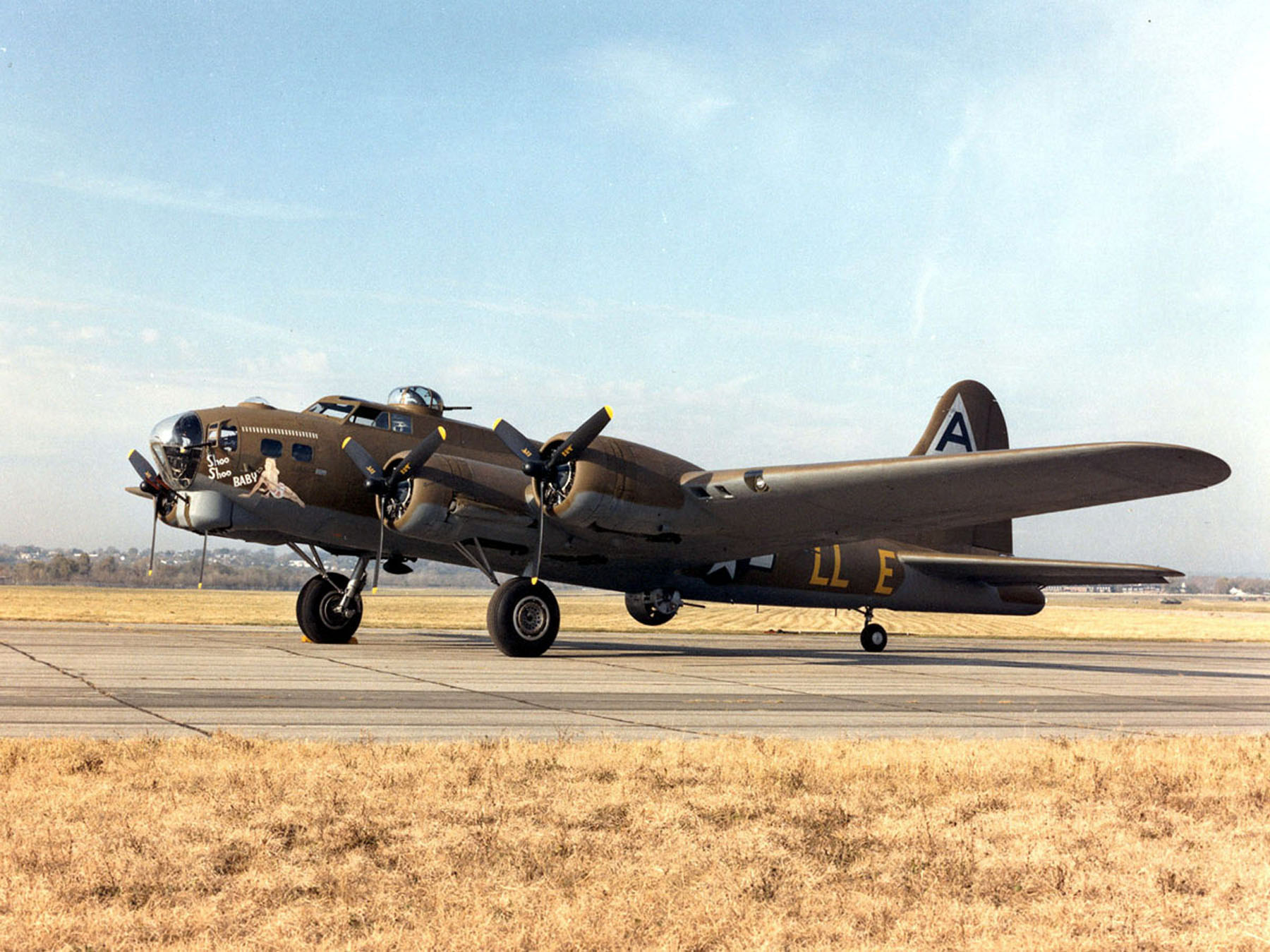
- Boeing B-17G Shoo Shoo Shoo Baby at the National Museum of the United States Air Force

General information
- Other name: Shoo Shoo Baby
- Type: Boeing B-17G-35-BO Flying Fortress
- Manufacturer: Boeing Airplane Company
- Owners: USAF
- Serial: 42-32076

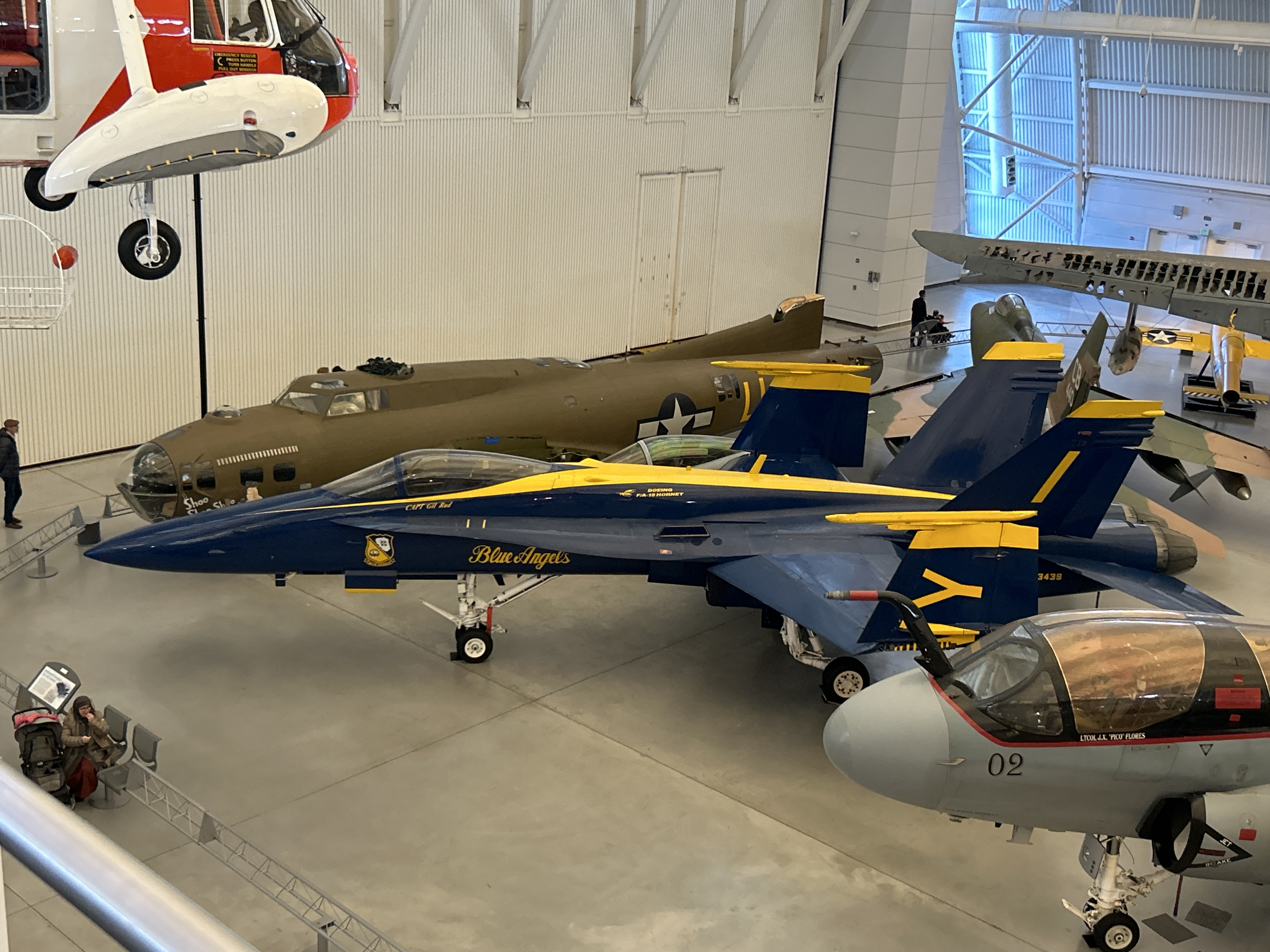
The fuselage of Shoo Shoo Shoo Baby at the Steven F. Udvar-Hazy Center, 3 February 2024, placed next to the museum's F/A-18C Hornet and EA-6B Prowler.

Shoo Shoo Shoo Baby, originally Shoo Shoo Baby, is a Boeing B-17 Flying Fortress in World War II, preserved and currently awaiting reassembly at the Smithsonian's National Air and Space Museum. A B-17G-35-BO, serial number 42-32076, and manufactured by Boeing, it was named by her crew for a song of the same name made popular by The Andrews Sisters, the favorite song of its crew chief T/Sgt. Hank Cordes. Photographs of the bomber indicate that a third "Shoo" was added to the name at some point in May 1944 when the original aircraft commander completed his tour of duty and was replaced by another pilot.

The nose art on the airframe was one of some 130 pieces painted by line mechanic Tony Starcer for "The Ragged Irregulars", this one based on Alberto Vargas' "Hawaii" Esquire pin up art.

At the end of the war it was stranded in Sweden, and after some negotiations ended up in civilian service in Europe, but was out of service by the 1960s. A plan was worked out to return it to the United States. It was restored to flying condition by the 1980s and was put on display at the National Museum of the Air force for many years. In 2008, that museum arranged to trade it for another B-17 (The Swoose) with the Smithsonian, with the aircraft being dismantled and moved in 2023 to the Steven F. Udvar-Hazy Center where it is planned to go on permanent display.

== Service history ==
Shoo Shoo Shoo Baby began as airframe number 7190 at Boeing Plant No.2 in Seattle, Washington.

The aircraft that would become Shoo Shoo Baby was accepted into the U.S. Army Air Forces inventory on 19 January 1944. It was flown to the Cheyenne Modification Center, Cheyenne, Wyoming, on 24 January, to Grand Island Army Air Field, Grand Island, Nebraska, on 6 February, and to Presque Isle Army Airfield, Presque Isle, Maine, on 29 February. It arrived in Great Britain on 2 March, and after further depot modifications, it was flown to RAF Bassingbourn on 23 March. Assigned to the 401st Bombardment Squadron of the 91st Bombardment Group, it began flying missions the next day. 2nd Lt. Paul C. McDuffee was the first pilot assigned to the aircraft and flew 14 of his 25 missions in it, but nine different crews flew Shoo Shoo Baby on missions.

The aircraft would fly 23 missions with the 91st, and did not have fixed crew but rather crews rotated in and out of it.

The crew named it for the song "Shoo-Shoo Baby", which was crew chief Hank Cordes and his wife's favorite song at that time; later an additional Shoo was added when McDuffee completed his tour of duty. The next mission would prove to be its last with 91st Group because it went MIA; it had mechanical troubles and managed to land in neutral Sweden.

The B-17 flew 24 combat missions from England with the 91st BG, with three other missions aborted for mechanical problems, before being listed as missing in action on 29 May 1944. On its final mission, to the Focke Wulf aircraft component factory at Poznań, Poland, it suffered mechanical problems deep in enemy territory and Shoo Shoo Shoo Baby's crew was forced to land the aircraft at Malmö Airport, Sweden.

== Final mission ==
The crew of Shoo Shoo Baby on the Poznań mission consisted of:

- 2nd Lt. Robert J. Gunther, pilot
- 2nd Lt. George Havrisik, co-pilot
- 2nd Lt. John M. Lowdermilk, navigator
- 2nd Lt. Leonard V. Peterson, bombardier
- T/Sgt. James Shoesmith, top turret gunner
- T/Sgt. John H. Bigham, radio operator/waist gunner
- S/Sgt. Nick Premenko, ball turret gunner
- S/Sgt. Harry J. Teems, tail gunner
- S/Sgt. Harold F. Nicely, waist gunner

This crew had been formed 26 April 1944, from replacements, and had flown five previous missions together, all in aircraft other than Shoo Shoo Baby. The crew's navigator, 2nd Lt John M. Lowdermilk, described the circumstances of Shoo Shoo Baby's final mission:

Soon after we crossed the German border, we lost number three engine, I believe because of losing oil pressure. Bob could not get the prop feathered (rotated 90° to put the blade edge perpendicular to the airflow). It continued to windmill (turn without power in the airflow) the entire trip with no vibration. We attempted to stay in formation with three engines but found this impossible and had to drop out. We continued on course to the best of my ability. We were losing altitude but continued to the target and dropped our bombs. Flying alone toward the Baltic Sea, we saw many German fighters attacking formations of B-17s and could not understand why they didn’t pick us out as a straggler. Before we reached the Baltic Sea, we lost the second engine, and the decision had to be made to go to Sweden because we could not make it back to England. Bob asked for a course to Sweden, and I charted one to a little town called Ystad in the very southernmost part of Sweden.

All loose equipment, including machine guns, radio equipment, and clothing, was thrown overboard in order to lighten the ship. An attempt was made to drop the ball turret, but it wouldn’t move.

As we approached the coastline, Bob was interested in knowing whether or not it was Sweden. I confidently stated that it was, but after the flak started coming up as we got over land, I wasn’t so sure. All of it was low, and I believe the Swedes were just telling us "Don't try anything." Just before we reached land we lost the third engine, and we were losing altitude fast. A Swedish (J 9) fighter came up and led us to Malmö, Sweden, where a B-24, also in trouble, landed just ahead of us. Actually, we had to swing wide to keep from colliding.

== European service ==
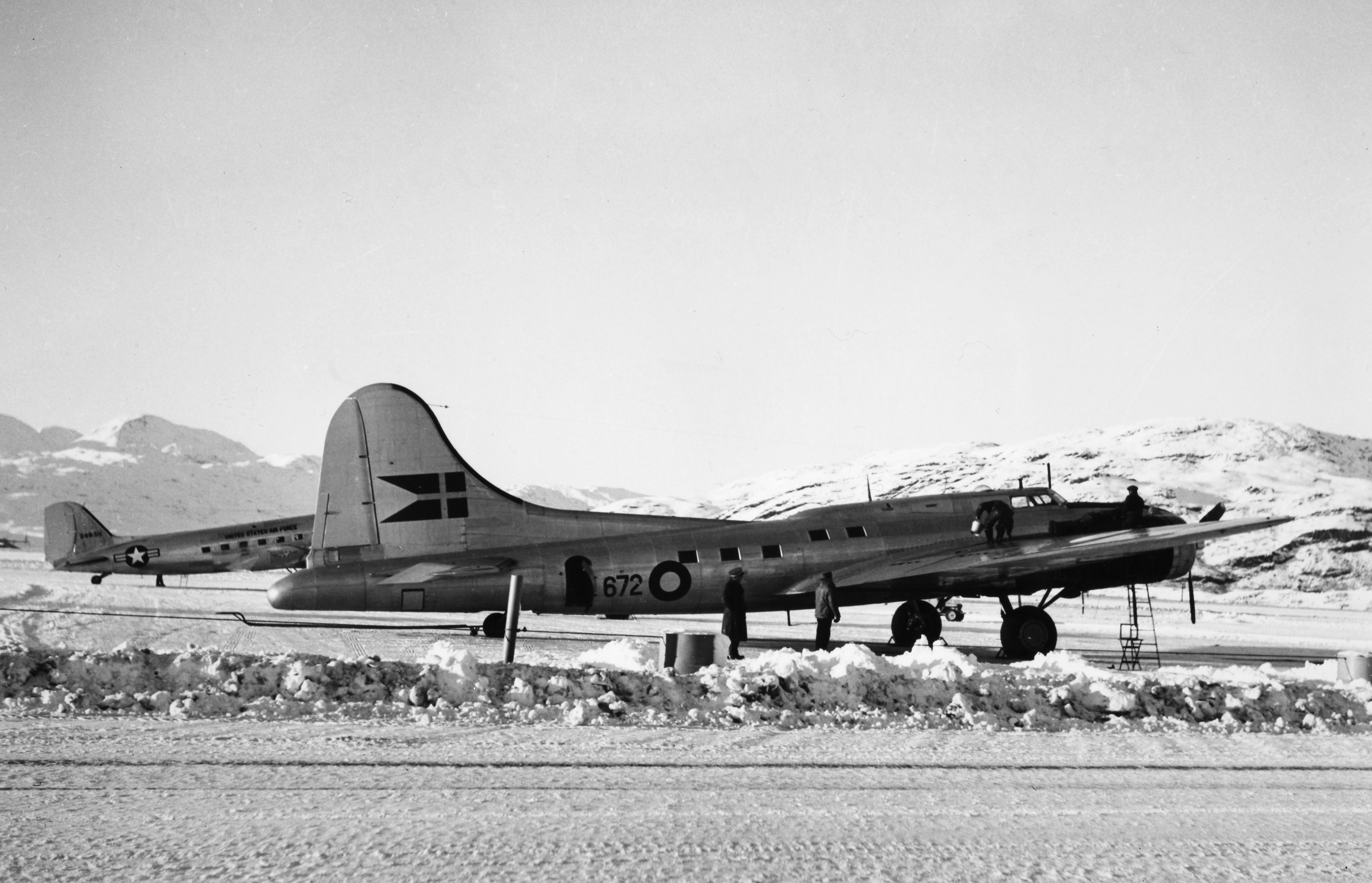
In military service registered 672 with Royal Danish Air Force in Greenland

Sweden, a neutral country, interned the crew and aircraft, one of eight U.S. heavy bombers that diverted to Sweden that day. A deal was made between the Swedish and U.S. governments to permit around 300 American crewmen to be repatriated in exchange for a promise not to use the crewmen in combat again and to formally turn over to Sweden nine B-17s that had landed intact. Seven of these were converted by Saab Aircraft into airliners that could carry 14 passengers, and Shoo Shoo Shoo Baby flew for SILA (now Scandinavian Airlines).

In December 1945 it was one of two B-17s sold to Danish carrier Det Danske Luftfartselskab A/S, later a part of SAS, and remained in civilian service until June 1947 as the "Stig Viking" (civilian registry OY-DFA). The B-17 was subsequently transferred in March 1948 to the Danish Army Air Corps, flying as "Store Bjørn" 672, and in December 1949, to the Danish Naval Air Service. From October 1952 the Danish Air Force 721 Squadron used the transport for Greenland; finally retiring it a year later. After two years in storage, she was sold to the Institut Géographique National, the French aerial mapping agency based in Creil outside Paris, and flew under the civilian registry F-BGSH. The aircraft last flew in July 1961, and then lay abandoned for several years.

== Restoration and display ==
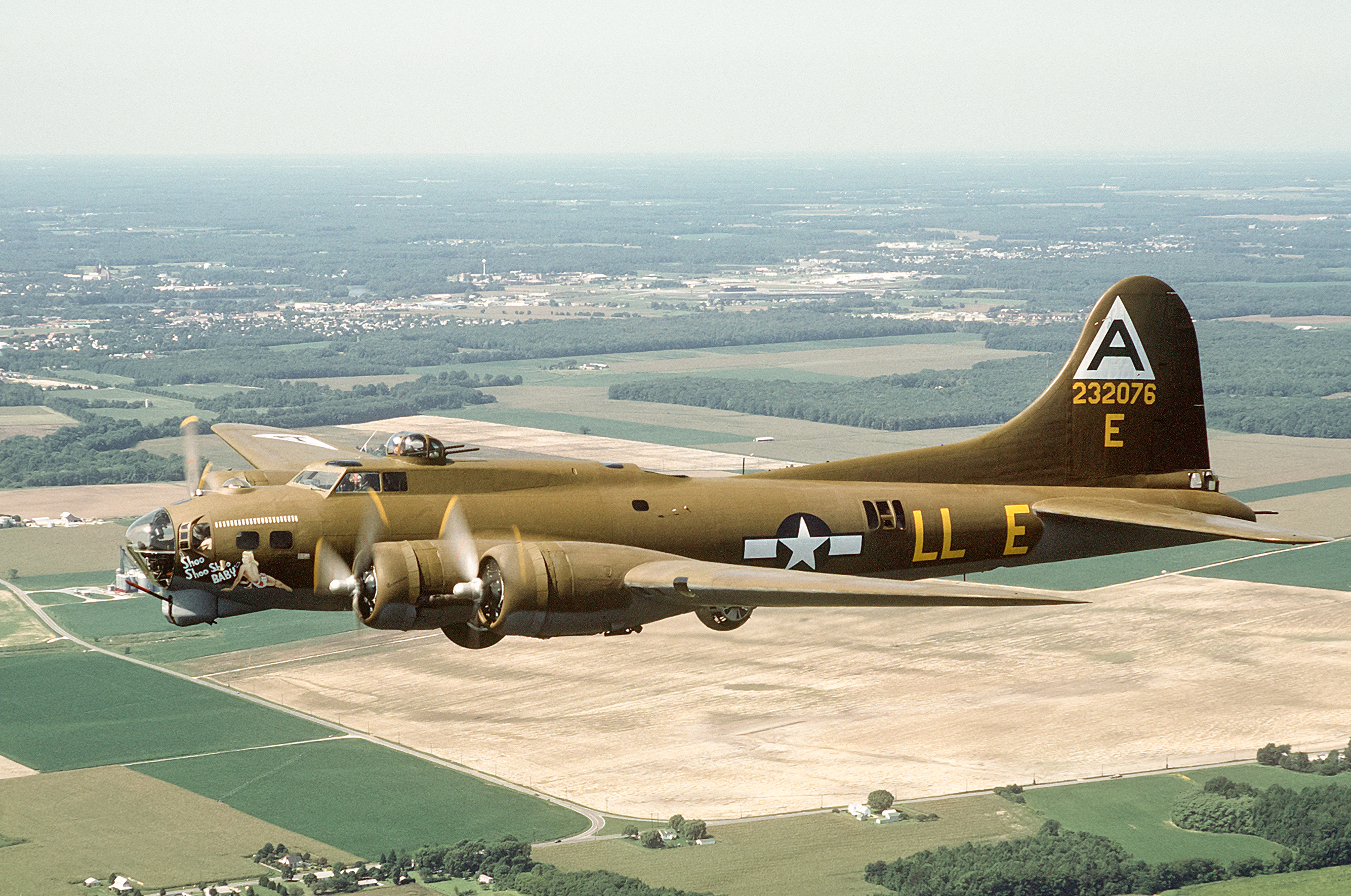
On a test flight in 1988 after its restoration

The aircraft was tracked down by Steve Birdsall, a noted military aviation historian from Australia. The remains of the plane were donated to the U.S. Air Force in 1972 when French officials presented the B-17 to Secretary of the Air Force Robert C. Seamans, Jr. for preservation. The journey from France required the assistance of the United States Air Forces in Europe to disassemble and crate the plane for truck shipment to Rhein-Main Air Base in Germany and then eventual airlift to the United States by C-5A transport.

Among those greeting the aircraft on its return were its wartime pilot Paul McDuffee, who had become an insurance salesman in Tampa, Florida, and retired USAF Major General Stanley T. Wray, the first commander of the 91st Bomb Group.

A lengthy restoration was undertaken between 1978 and 1988 at Dover Air Force Base, Delaware by the 512th Antique Restoration Group in an effort that tallied some 60,000 man hours. The aircraft required significant work, such as a new set of engines and reversing modifications that had been made to fit it for aerial mapping work; most original wartime components had been removed. In 1981, Tony Starcer recreated his original nose art at Dover Air Force Base, Delaware, for the Fortress. The aircraft was flown to Dayton on 13 October 1988, restored as Shoo Shoo Shoo Baby.

The B-17 was put on display in place of a long-time exhibit, the former drone-controller DB-17P, "44-83624" (a converted B-17G that did not see combat), which was subsequently sent to the Air Mobility Command Museum at Dover Air Force Base sans its top turret, which it gave up for the restoration of Shoo Shoo Baby. The reborn veteran is finished in olive drab and grey instead of bare-metal as it was in its combat operations due to the amount of skin work required to restore its wartime appearance.

The aircraft was removed from display in March 2018 in preparation for the May 2018 debut of the Memphis Belle exhibit in the World War II Gallery of the National Museum of the United States Air Force (NMUSAF) at Wright-Patterson Air Force Base near Dayton, Ohio.

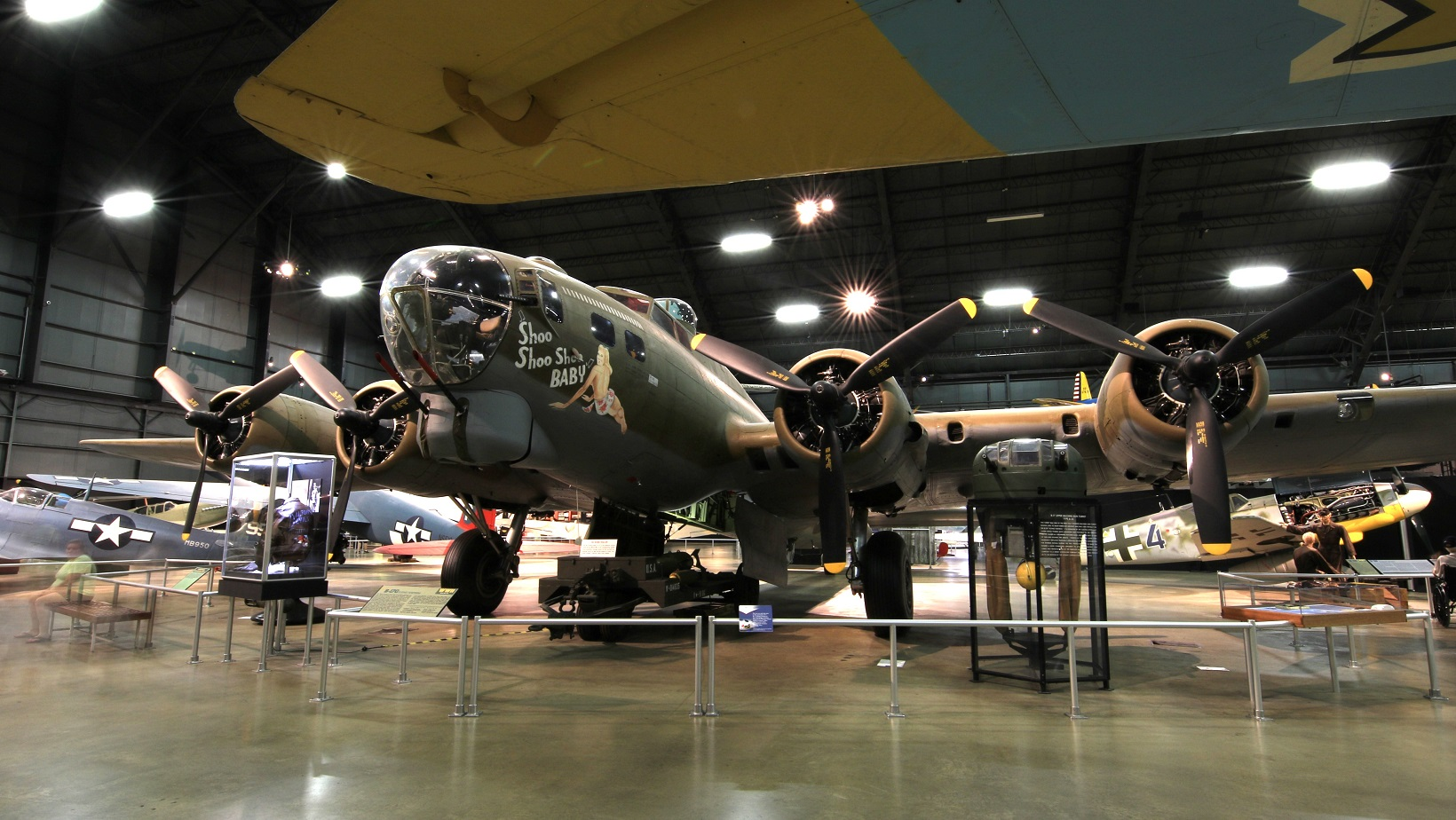
B-17G Shoo Shoo Shoo Baby on display at the National Museum of USAF in the early 2000s

== Move to the Smithsonian ==
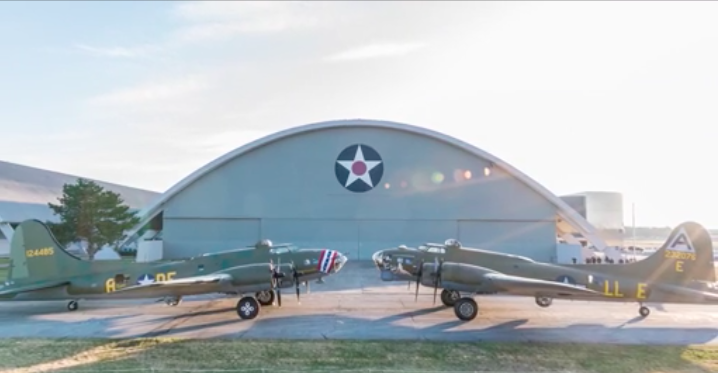
Memphis Belle (left) with Shoo Shoo Shoo Baby on 14 March 2018 during their exchange at the National Museum of the US Air Force

Shoo Shoo Shoo Baby was replaced in the World War II gallery by the restored B-17F Memphis Belle in March 2018. It was placed in storage at the National Museum of the US Air Force's (NMUSAF) restoration facility.

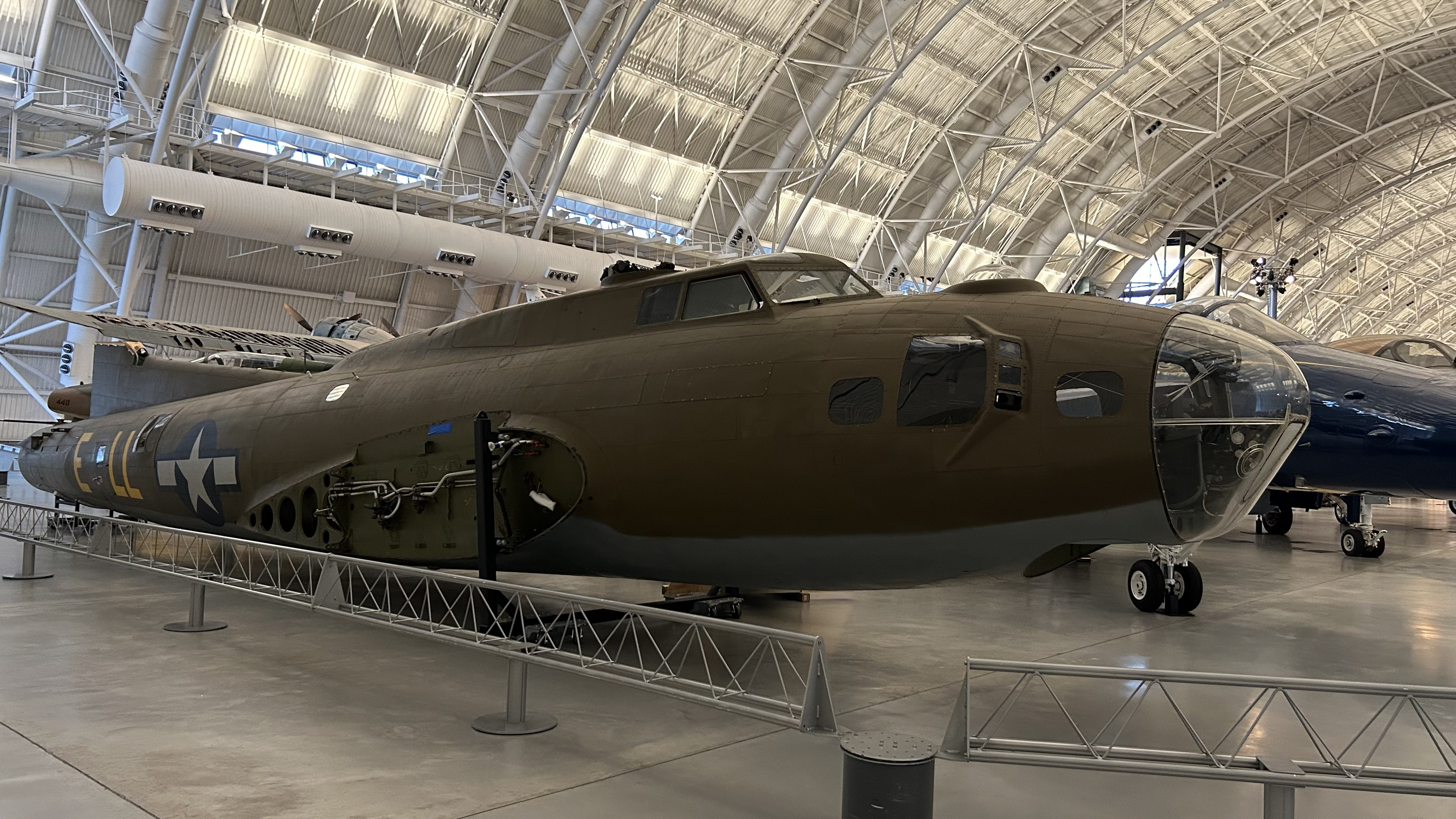
Shoo Shoo Shoo Baby at the Steven F. Udvar-Hazy Center, 10 February 2024, awaiting reassembly after its arrival. In preparation for the move to the museum, its wings, tail, engines, landing gear and chin-mounted machine guns were temporarily removed.

Shoo Shoo Shoo Baby is planned to be transferred to the National Air and Space Museum's Steven F. Udvar-Hazy Center outside Washington, D.C. for permanent display. Shoo Shoo Shoo Baby's transfer to Washington, D.C. was part of a swap arranged with the Smithsonian to acquire a B-17D, The Swoose, from storage outside of Washington, D.C.

The decision to transfer Shoo Shoo Shoo Baby raised some concerns among the staff and patrons of the NMUSAF, as Shoo Shoo Shoo Baby is one of the world's finest restored examples of a B-17G, and has been a popular exhibit at the museum for many years. It was ultimately pointed out that with display of the Memphis Belle and eventual display of The Swoose, the NMUSAF will possess the world's two most historically significant B-17s, and another B-17G model can easily be obtained when funds and space become available. When restoration is completed on The Swoose, it will eventually join Memphis Belle on display at the Museum.

As of 2024, Shoo Shoo Shoo Baby is at the Steven F. Udvar-Hazy Center, and is awaiting reassembly and a dedicated display, being put next to the museum's fighter jets in the interim. Shoo Shoo Shoo Baby’s fuselage was situated next to the museum's F/A-18C Hornet and E-A6B Prowler, while its wings were placed next to the F-14D Tomcat.

In May 2025, Shoo Shoo Shoo Baby was seen moved to the back side of the World War II German Aviation Gallery on the first floor and adjacent to the Mary Baker Engen Restoration Hangar. Shoo Shoo Shoo Baby remains in an unassembled state, but the fuselage is now reunited with the palleted engines and landing gear, the upper gun turret, as well as the wings and props that are stored in various frames.

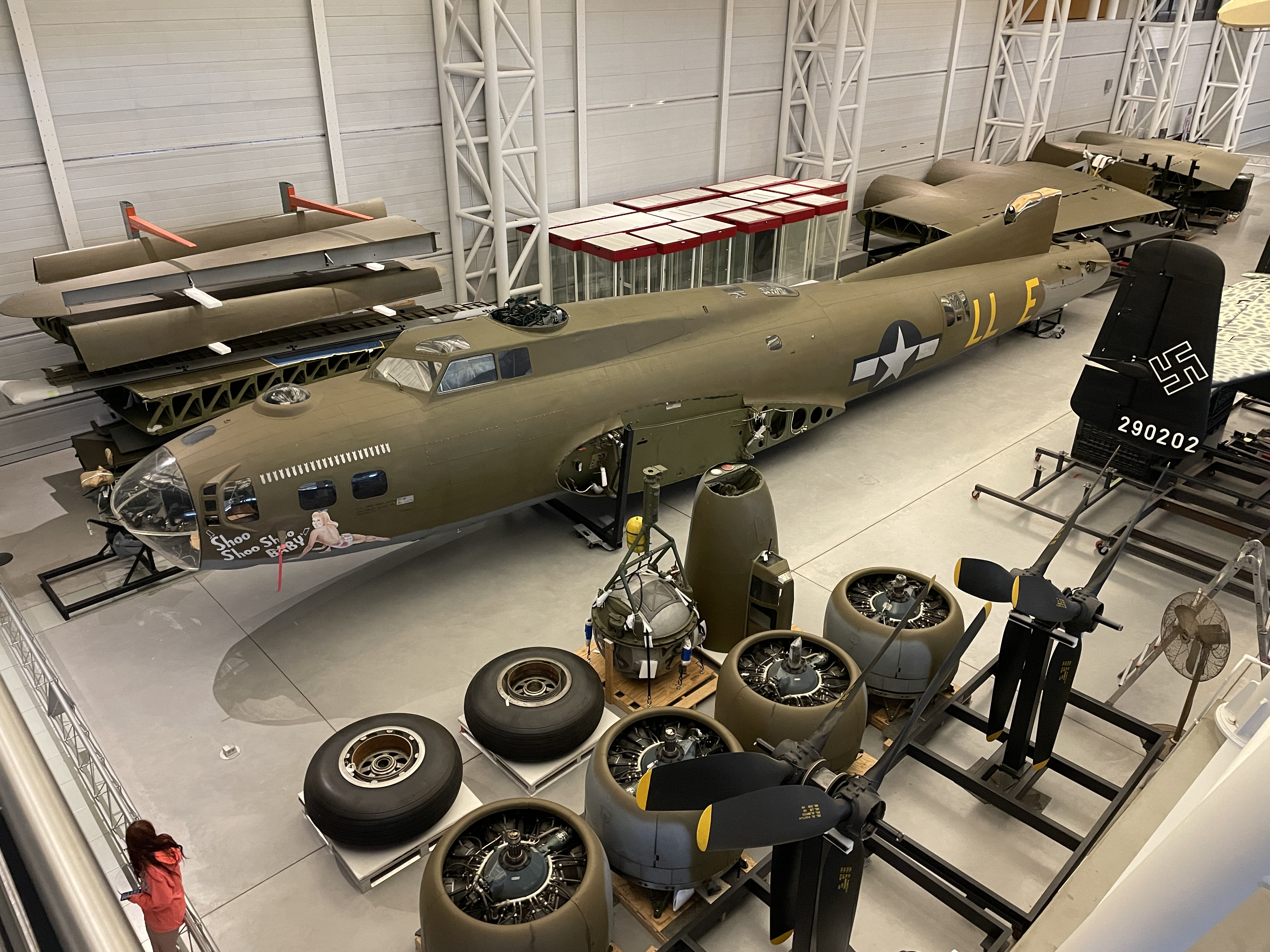
Shoo Shoo Shoo Baby as it sits in May 2025 behind the World War II Aviation Gallery, along with various parts and components

As of September 2025, Shoo Shoo Shoo Baby is awaiting its reassembly, which is planned to take place after the Steven F. Udvar-Hazy Center receives an expansion to create room for additional aerospace items in their collection.

== Sources ==
- Holder, William G. "The Return of Shoo-Shoo Baby" Air University Review
- Freeman, Roger A. with Osborne, David, The B-17 Flying Fortress Story, Arms & Armour Press, an imprint of the Cassell Group, London, WC2R 0BB, 1998, ISBN 1-85409-301-0.
- Thompson, Scott A., Final Cut – The Post-War B-17 Flying Fortress: The Survivors, Revised Edition, Pictorial Histories Publishing Company, Missoula, Montana, 2000, ISBN 1-57510-077-0.
