= Steve Birdsall =

Australian aviation writer

Steve Birdsall (born 1944) of Sydney, Australia, is an aviation writer who has authored many articles and books since the 1960s. He has been published by Air Classics, Flying Review International, Airpower Historian, and the American Aviation Historical Society Journal. His wife is Sandra Birdsall.

Birdsall toured briefly in Vietnam during the Vietnam War, as a correspondent for an Australian magazine. He flew several airborne missions including one in the A-1 Skyraider, about which he later wrote an illustrated history.

It was Birdsall who tracked down and confirmed the existence of 91st Bomb Group combat veteran B-17G Shoo Shoo Baby in the late 1960s, sitting dormant at Creil Air Base, Creil, France.

He should not be confused with American travel writer Stephen S. Birdsall.

== Published books ==
- The A-1 Skyraider, ISBN 978-0-668-02188-3 (January 1970)
- Log of the Liberators: An Illustrated history of the B-24, ISBN 978-0-385-03870-6 (June 1973 hardcover)
- Hells Angels, Challenge Publishing Co.
- Flying Buccaneers: The Illustrated Story of Kenney's Fifth Air Force, ISBN 978-0-385-03218-6 (January 1977)
- B-17 Flying Fortress, TAB Books, ISBN 978-0-8168-5646-6 (May 1979)
- B-24 in Action, ISBN 978-0-89747-020-9 (October 1979)
- Saga of the Superfortress: The Dramatic Story of the B-29 and the Twentieth Air Force, ISBN 978-0-385-13668-6 (October 1980 hardcover)
- Superfortress, the Boeing B-29 (Aircraft Specials series (6028)), ISBN 978-0-89747-104-6 (January 1984 paperback)
- B-26 Marauder in Action (Aircraft No. 50), ISBN 978-0-89747-119-0 (February 1982)
- B-17 Flying Fortress in Color (Fighting Colors series (6561)), ISBN 978-0-89747-180-0 (August 1986)
- B-24 Liberator (Famous Aircraft series), ISBN 978-0-8168-5657-2 (February 1986 paperback)
- Claims to Fame: The B-17 Flying Fortress (with Roger A. Freeman), ISBN 978-1-85409-424-7 (October 1997 paperback); ISBN 978-1-85409-211-3 (March 1995 hardcover)
- Pride of Seattle: The Story of the first 300 B-17Fs (Aircraft Specials series (6074)), ISBN 978-0-89747-389-7 (June 1998 paperback)
