= Swoose =

Hybrid between a swan and a goose

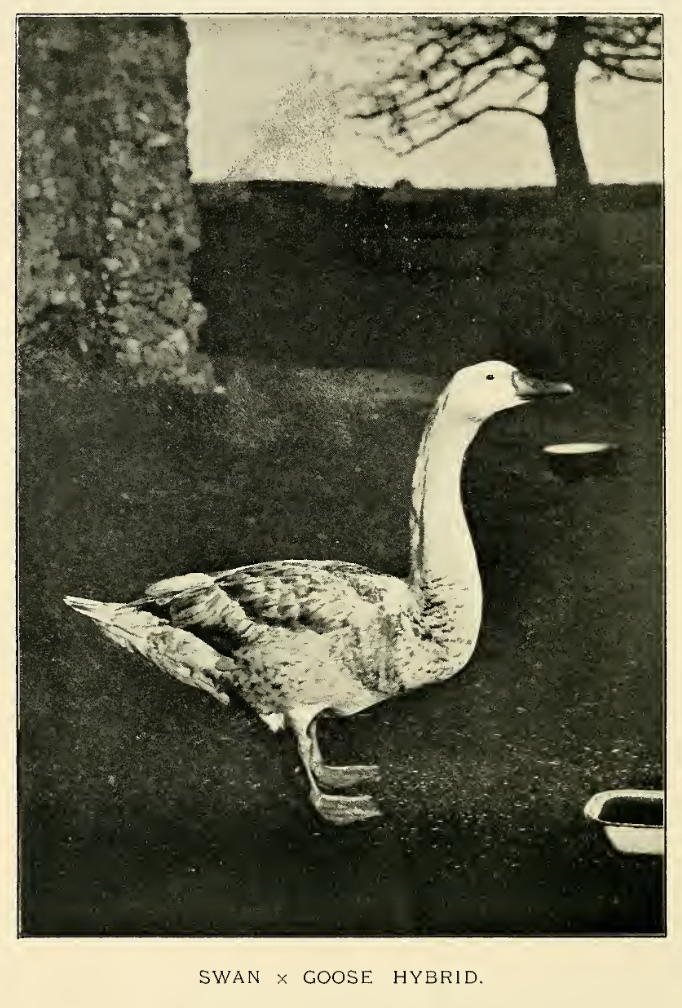
Figure 1. An alleged mute swan × domestic goose hybrid hatched in captivity in 1910 in Norfolk England

A swoose (/swuːs/) is a rare hybrid between a swan (Cygnus sp.) and a goose (family Anatidae). The name is a portmanteau of swan and goose.

Among all orders of birds, Anseriformes, (the order containing ducks, geese and swans), hybridize with the greatest frequency. Waterfowl which are domesticated, raised in captivity, cross-fostered by a different species, or don't have access to members of their own species are especially prone to seek mates among other species.

While most hybrids occur between members of the same genus, a handful of intergeneric crosses between geese and swans have been reported. The identity of the birds is presumed based on appearance and the presence of adult birds assumed to be the biological parents.

== Suggested explanations for reported hybrids ==
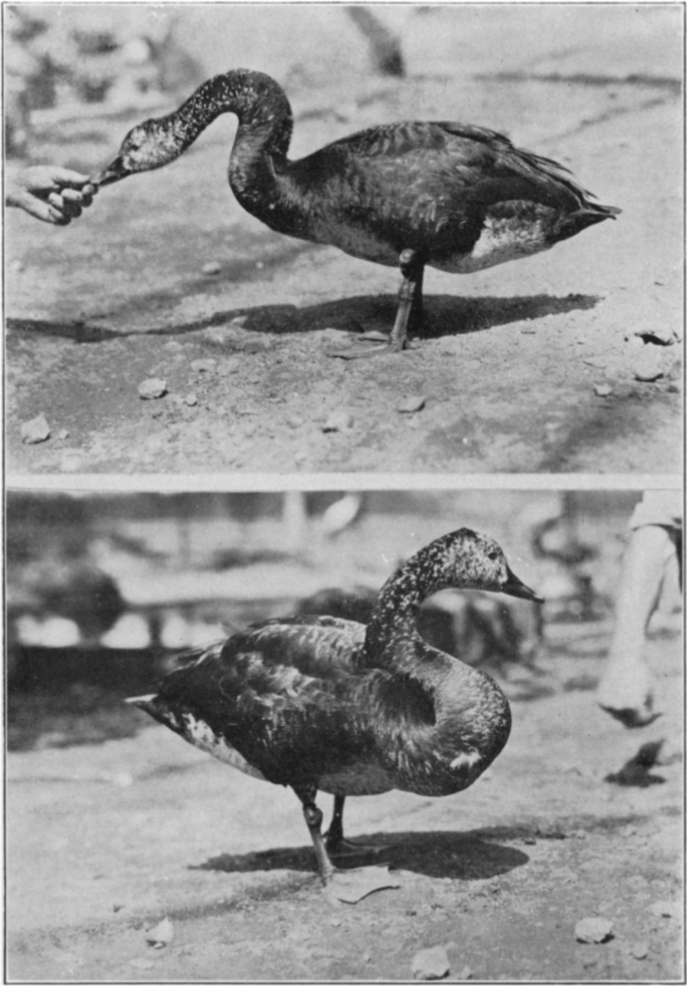
Figure 2. An alleged hybrid between a black swan and a Canada goose photographed in Wellesley Hills, Massachusetts in 1925

=== Factors driving hybridization ===
==== Dispersal patterns ====
Female geese and swans remain tend to remain near their birthplace while males disperse. As a consequence males tend to settle new habitats first when a species' range expands. The initial wave of colonizing males, unable to find potential partners of their own species, may form less -preferred partnerships with other species.

Geese and swans have somewhat similar courtship rituals involving mutual head-dipping; these may be congruent enough to allow them to pair.

==== Cross-fostering ====
Intraspecific nest parasitism is common among geese. Interspecific nest parasitism is less common; however greylag geese, snow geese, and Canada geese have been known to lay their eggs in the nests of other species. Greylag goose eggs have been found in the nests of mute swans and vice versa. Mute swans have been documented hatching greylag goose eggs and raising greylag goose goslings. In rare cases, Anseriformes may adopt hatchlings belonging to different species; there has been at least once reported case of adoption of a greylag gosling by mute swans.

Young birds cross-fostered by a different species imprint on their foster parents and may consequently seek a mate belonging to the fostering species. Cross-fostering

has been shown to influence mate choice in male greylag geese (this does not hold true for females of the species).

==== Captivity and domestication ====
Waterfowl in captivity are more likely to hybridize than their wild counterparts, often due to a lack of available conspecific partners.

Several species of geese have been domesticated by humans. When returned to a natural setting domestic geese do not fully revert to the behaviour of their wild counterparts; they continue to display unnatural behaviour, including an increased tendency to breed outside of their species.

=== Factors driving misidentification ===
Hybrids between domestic geese and wild geese or between different species of swans may be mistaken for swan-goose hybrids.

Young birds may be seen with adults who are not their biological parents due to cross-fostering or parent birds re-partnering.

The goose Anser cygnoides is commonly known as the swan goose. Reports of swan goose hybrids (i.e. hybrids between the swan goose and other goose species) may be confused for swan-goose hybrids (hybrids between swans and geese).

== List of reported swan-goose hybrids ==
Whooper swan ♂ × domestic goose ♀

- Hatched in 1808 at the menagerie of the Muséum d'histoire naturelle in Paris. The swan had lived in the menagerie since it was young and did not have access to others of its species. It had previously been observed mating with a mute swan and later paired with a three-legged goose; this mating produced a clutch of nine eggs, only one of which hatched. The juvenile hybrid was similar in coloration to a gosling but was considerably larger.

Mute swan ♂ × domestic goose ♀

- Hatched in Norfolk, England in 1910, bred from captive parents (Figure 1). The taxidermied specimen is on display at the Viktor Wynd Museum of Curiosities in London.

Black Swan ♂ × Canada Goose ♀

- Hatched in Wellesley Hills, Massachusetts in 1924, reported in a 1928 paper with photograph (Figure 2). The skeleton is preserved at the Museum of Comparative Zoology in Cambridge, Massachusetts.

Mute swan ♀ × Greylag goose ♂

- Two hatchlings born in Staffanstrop, Sweden in 1972 and 1975, reported in a 2007 paper. The goose father was known to have been cross-fostered by mute swans.

Mute swan × Greylag goose

- Reported from Wohlensee, Switzerland in 1997, with photograph. The goose parent may have been a domestic greylag goose × swan goose hybrid.

Mute swan × domestic goose

- A photograph of two reported hybrids from 2001 was published in a 2008 issue of the digital poultry magazine Aviculture Europe.

Mute swan × domestic goose

- Hatched in 2004 in Dorset, England, tagged by the Radipole Ringing Group and extensively photographed.

Mute swan ♀ × Canada Goose ♂

- Reported from south Jutland, Denmark in 2006.

== In popular culture ==
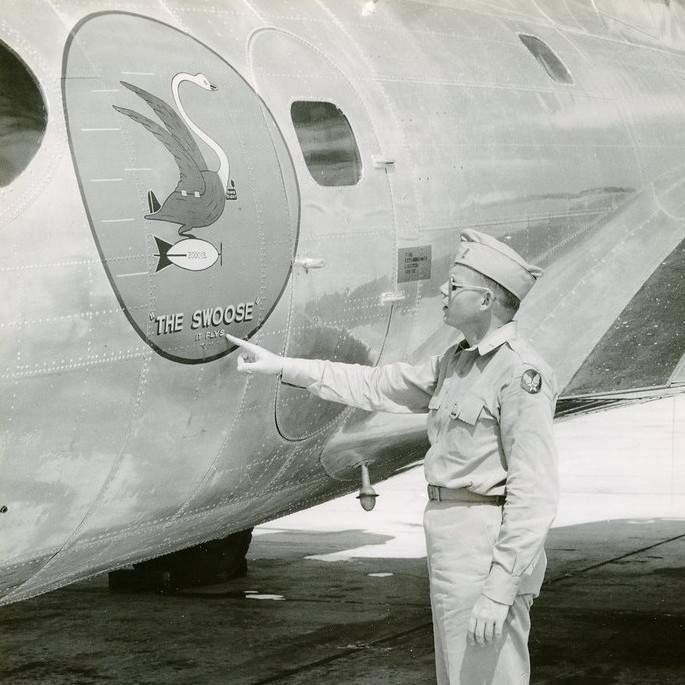
The Swoose, a World War II-era Boeing B-17D-BO Flying Fortress bomber

In 1941, the American bandleader Kay Kyser released the song "Alexander the Swoose (Half Swan - Half Goose)" which rose to #3 on the US Billboard chart." The Boeing B-17D-BO Flying Fortress bomber The Swoose, which was constructed from the parts of other aircraft, was named after the swan-goose cross in reference to its "hybrid" origins; the name was inspired by the popular song by Kyser. The Emmy- and two-time-Tony-award winning actress Swoosie Kurtz, the daughter of the Swoose's pilot, was named after the aircraft.

Dick King-Smith, who authored the source material for the film Babe, wrote a lesser-known children's book called The Swoose about a swan-goose hybrid.

== See also ==
- Thomas (goose)
- Gamebird hybrids
