= Tony Starcer =

American soldier and artist

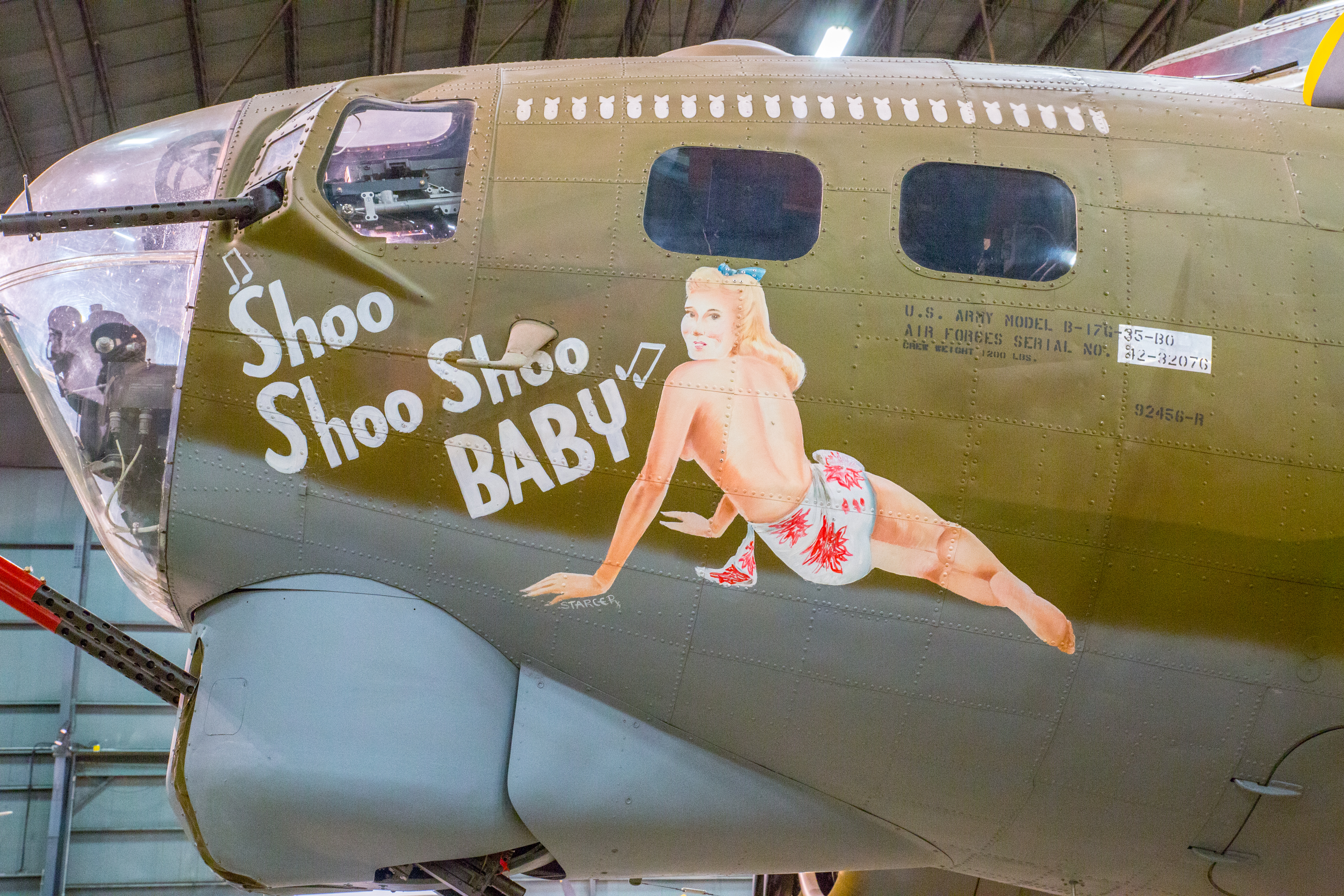
Shoo Shoo Baby (B-17)

Anthony L. Starcer (September 16, 1919 – June 9, 1986) was an American soldier and artist during World War II, known for his nose art work.

Starcer was drafted into military service on June 2, 1942, attended basic training before receiving orders to report to armorer school at San Angelo Army Air Field in San Angelo, Texas as part of the 861st Base Training Squadron. Graduating April 21, 1943. Starcer disembarked from the United States on June 30, 1943, arriving in England July 7 and finally reported for duty at Bassingbourn, UK on July 16, 1943. He served a total of 1 year, 11 months and 5 days overseas in WWII.

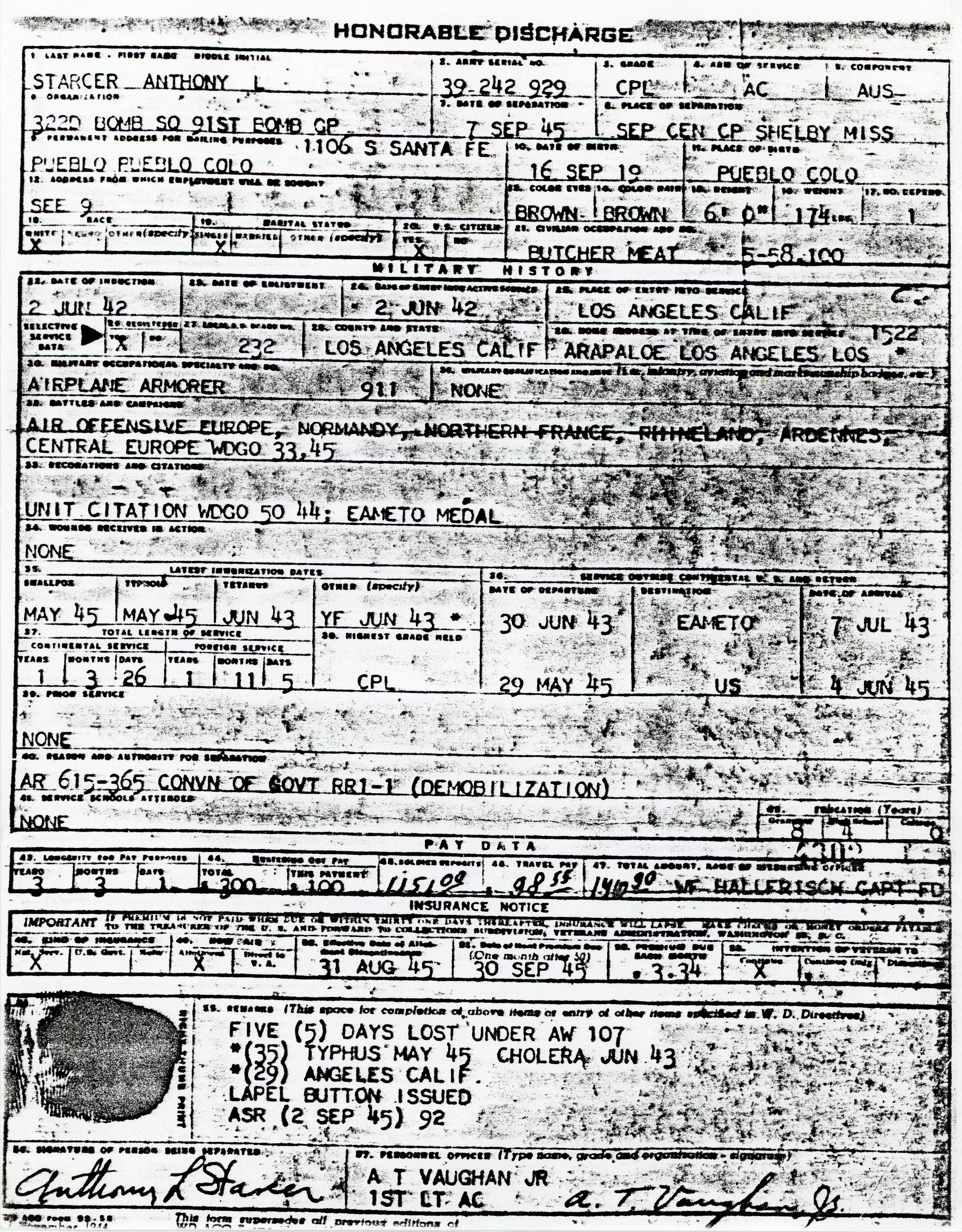
The service abstract on the reverse of Anthony Starcer's honorable discharge from September 7, 1945.

Honorably discharged as a sergeant in the US Army Air Force, Starcer was a line mechanic and one of the artists for the 91st Bombardment Group (Heavy), of the VIII Bomber Command, Eighth Army Air Force, based at Bassingbourn, UK in 1943–45.

He painted many pieces of nose art on the Fortresses of "The Ragged Irregulars", including the iconic Shoo Shoo Baby. The 91st Bombardment Group (H) website lists 124 aircraft that his work adorned.

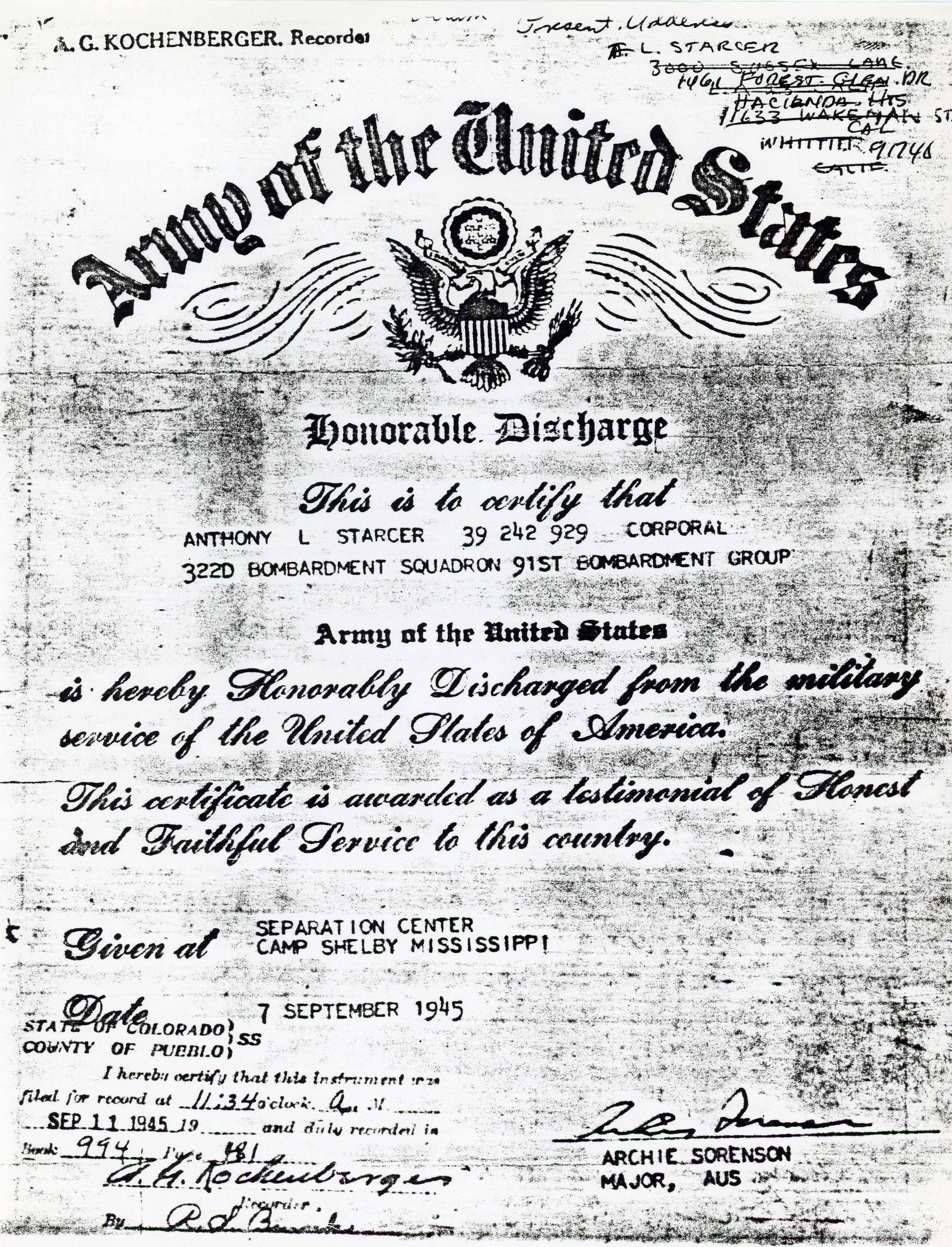
Anthony Starcer's honorable discharge from September 7, 1945.

Historically, he has been credited with painting the Memphis Belle; the record has now been corrected through the work of historians Dr. Harry Friedman and Graham Simons; the artwork is now attributed to civilian Anthony Hebert of Bangor, Maine. This can be found in The Friends Journal, Winter 2026, Vol. 49 No. 1.

Given the timeline of Starcer's arrival, there was no occasion for him to be in contact with the Memphis Belle or its crew in war time. The Belle departed from the United States at Bangor, Maine on September 25,1942. Tony would be in the midst of basic training, by the time he arrives in England in July of 1943, the famous aircraft was already back in the United States for its war bond tour.

Due to the new research several nose art projects attributed to Anthony Starcer are to be reconsidered, these include:

The Bad Penny, Bam Bam (Belonged to the 303rd Bomb Group), The Black Swan (Painted by Charles Busa), The Careful Virgin, Connecticut Yankee, Daddy's Delight (Belonged to the 303rd Bomb Group), Dame Satan, Delta Rebel, Delta Rebel No.2, Desperate Journey, The Eagle's Wrath, Excalibur, Fertile Myrtle (Belonged to the 96th Bomb Group), Fightin' Pappy (Nose art painted at the 306th Bomb Group), The Great Speckled Bird, Heavyweight Annihilators II, Hell's Angels, Jack the Ripper, Jersey Bounce, Memphis Belle, Nitemare, Oklahoma Okie, Our Gang, Pandora's Box, Quitchurbitchin (This nose art is very similar in style to Memphis Belle), Ritzy Blitz, The Sad Sack (Though there were 3 B-17s with this name in the 91st. He possibly could have painted 41–24504 as it was with the 91st until 15 March 1944, but that has no signature) The Shiftless Skunk, Sweet Rosie O'Grady (Belonged to the 303rd Bomb Group), Wild Hare (Painted by Charles Busa).

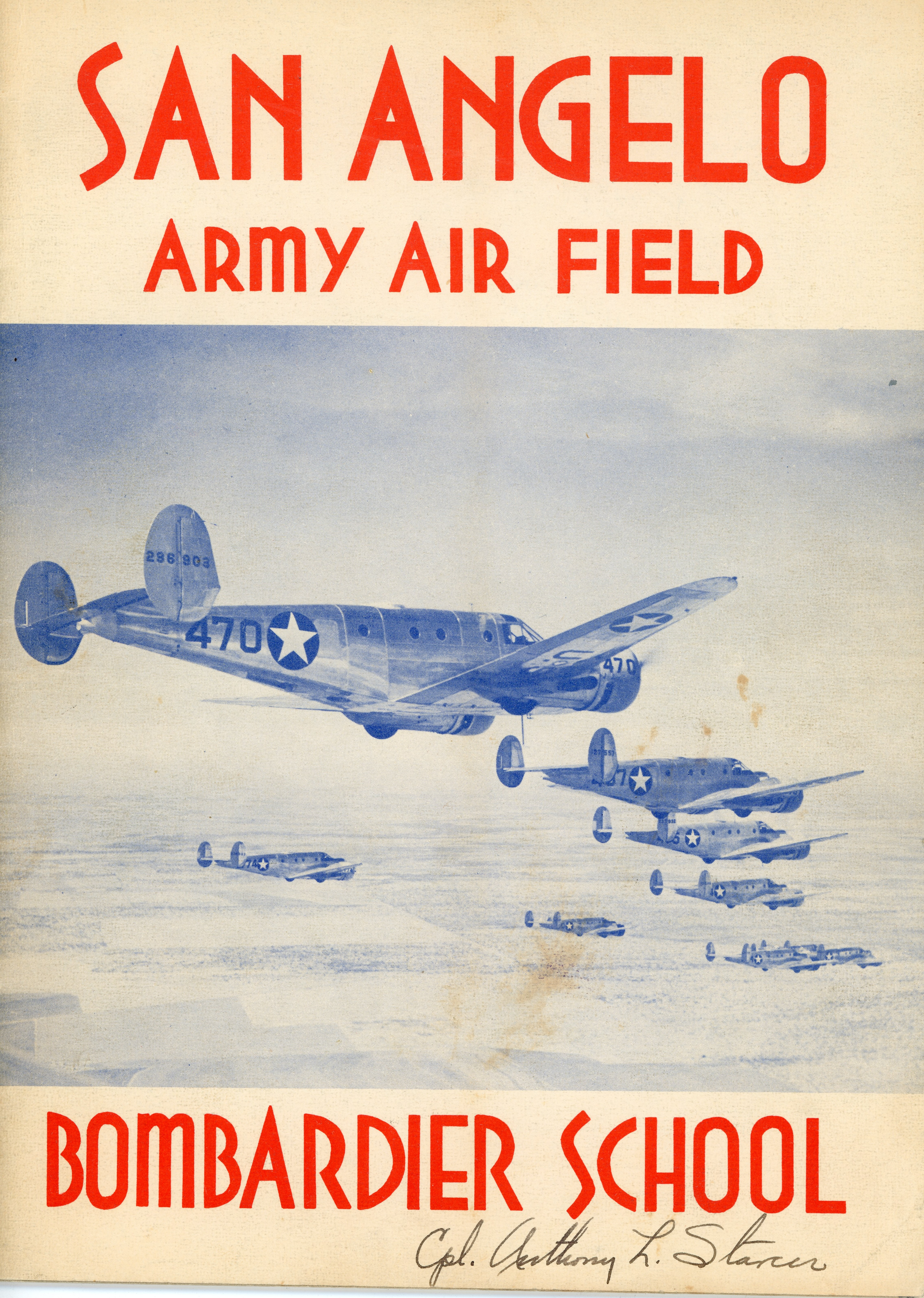
Souvenir booklet from San Angelo Army Air Base owned by Cpl. Anthony Starcer.

In 1981, Starcer recreated his nose art at Dover Air Force Base, Delaware, for restored B-17G Shoo Shoo Baby, one of the few surviving combat veteran Flying Fortresses, based on Alberto Vargas' "Hawaii" Esquire pin up art. This B-17 flew 24 combat missions from England with the 91st BG, plus three aborts for mechanical problems, before being listed as missing in action on 29 May 1944. On its final mission, to the Focke Wulf aircraft component factory at Poznań, Poland, it crash-landed at Malmö Airport, Sweden, where it would see post-war service before becoming a museum piece.

He was married to Jackie Starcer.
