= Shoo-Shoo Baby (song) =

Song performed by The Andrews Sisters

Single by The Andrews Sisters

from the album Three Cheers for the Boys
- B-side: "Down in the Valley"
- Published: 1943
- Released: December 1943
- Recorded: October 5, 1943
- Genre: Traditional pop
- Length: 2:51
- Label: Decca
- Songwriter: Phil Moore

"Shoo-Shoo Baby" is a popular song written by Phil Moore. The song was made famous by The Andrews Sisters, as they sang it in the 1943 film Three Cheers for the Boys. "Shoo, Shoo Baby" was a big hit for the trio in 1944, reaching No. 2 in the chart. Their version features a jazzy vocal pop arrangement typical of the time, with a key hook provided by the horns, and has appeared on many compilation albums of 1940s music.

== Other versions ==
Ella Mae Morse also recorded this song in 1943, with Dick Walters and His Orchestra. Released on Capitol Records, the single went to number four on the pop chart and number one on the R&B charts for 2 weeks in December 1943.

It was also recorded by Glenn Miller with vocals performed by the Crew Chiefs.

Frank Sinatra recorded the song in the 1940s.

== In popular culture ==
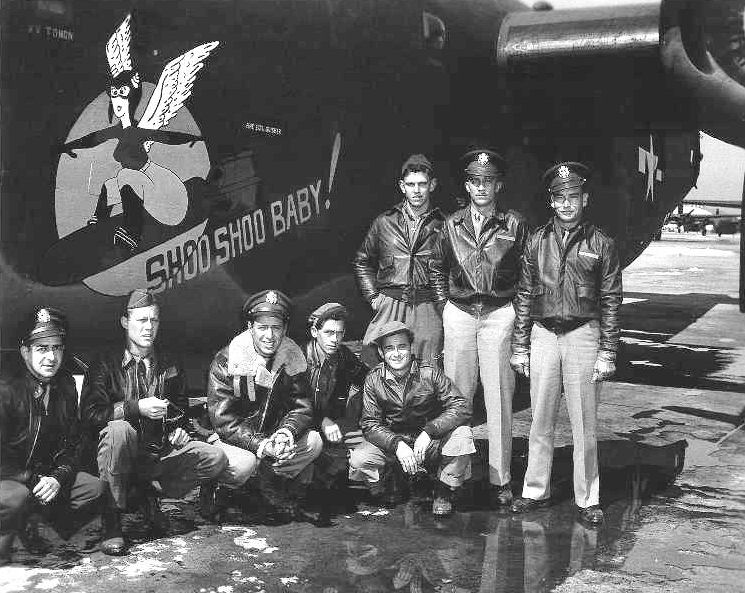
B-24 named Shoo Shoo Baby

A version of the song by an uncredited male singer is played over a radio at the Heavenly trial of the airman in the 1946 film A Matter of Life and Death as a symbol of modern America.

This song was also the inspiration for the naming of the Shoo Shoo Shoo Baby, a B-17 Flying Fortress which served during World War II. The aircraft was named after the song by its first crew, and the song was the favorite of its Crew Chief. An additional Shoo was added when its captain completed a tour of duty during WW2; the aircraft survived the war and is on display at the Smithsonian, in Washington, D.C. There was also a B-24 named for this song.
