= Nose art =

Decorative painting or design on the fuselage of an aircraft

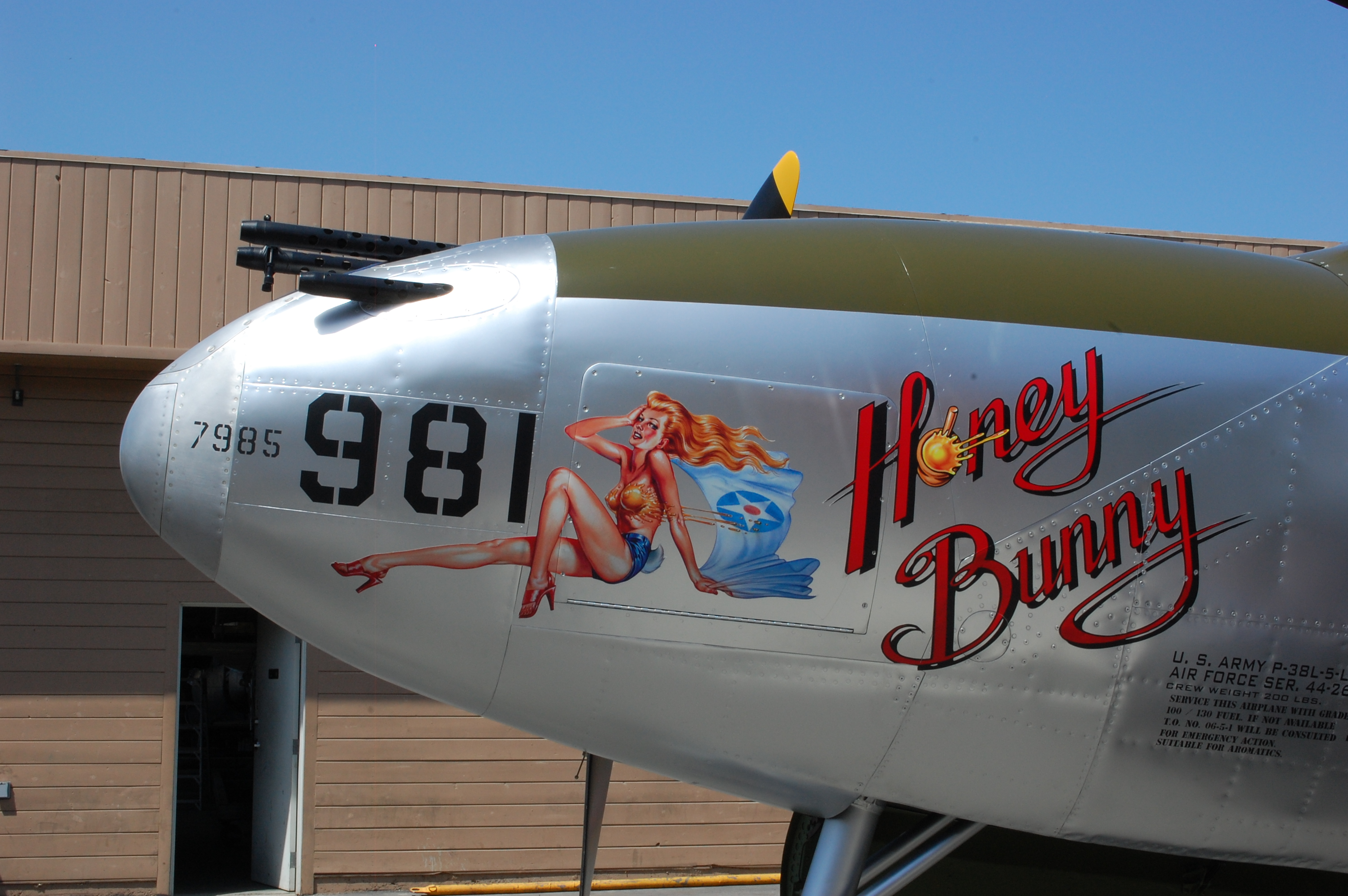
'Honey Bunny', a Lockheed P-38 Lightning

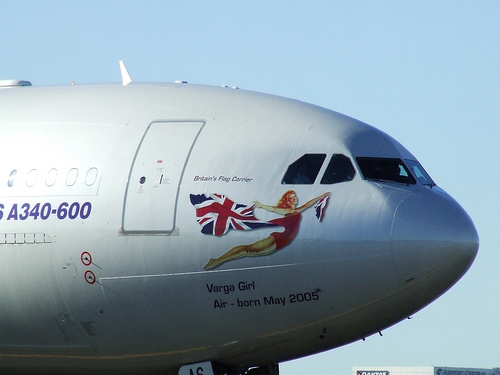
Virgin Atlantic nose art on 'Varga Girl', an Airbus A340-600. This particular nose art is used across Virgin Atlantic's fleet, and is officially named the Flying Lady.

Nose art is a decorative painting or design on the fuselage of an aircraft, usually on the front fuselage.

While begun for practical reasons of identifying friendly units, the practice evolved to express the individuality often constrained by the uniformity of the military, to evoke memories of home and peacetime life, and as a kind of psychological protection against the stresses of war and the probability of death. The appeal, in part, came from nose art not being officially approved, even when the regulations against it were not enforced.

Because of its individual and unofficial nature, it is considered folk art, inseparable from work as well as representative of a group. It can also be compared to sophisticated graffiti. In both cases, the artist is often anonymous, and the art itself is ephemeral. In addition, it relies on materials immediately available.

Nose art is largely a military tradition, but civilian airliners operated by the Virgin Group feature "Virgin Girls" on the nose as part of their livery. In a broad sense, the tail art of several airlines such as the Eskimo of Alaska Airlines can be called "nose art", as are the tail markings of present-day U.S. Navy squadrons. There were exceptions, including the VIII Bomber Command, 301st Bomb Group B-17F "Whizzer", which had its girl-riding-a-bomb on the dorsal fin.

== History ==
Placing personalized decorations on fighting aircraft began with Italian and German pilots. The first recorded example was a sea monster painted on an Italian flying boat in 1913. This was followed by the popular practice of painting a mouth beneath the propeller's spinner begun by German pilots in World War I. What is perhaps the most famous of all nose art, the shark-face insignia later made famous by the First American Volunteer Group (AVG) Flying Tigers, first appeared in World War I on a British Sopwith Dolphin and a German Roland C.II, though often with an effect more comical than menacing. The cavallino rampante ("prancing horse") of the Italian ace Francesco Baracca was another well-known image.

=== World War I ===
World War I nose art was usually embellished or extravagant squadron insignia. This followed the official policy established by the American Expeditionary Forces' Chief of the Air Service, Brigadier General Benjamin Foulois, on 6 May 1918, requiring the creation of distinct, readily identifiable squadron insignia. World War I examples include the "Hat in the Ring" of the American 94th Aero Squadron (attributed to Lt. Johnny Wentworth) and the "Kicking Mule" of the 95th Aero Squadron. Nose art of that era was often conceived and produced not by the pilots, but rather by ground crews.

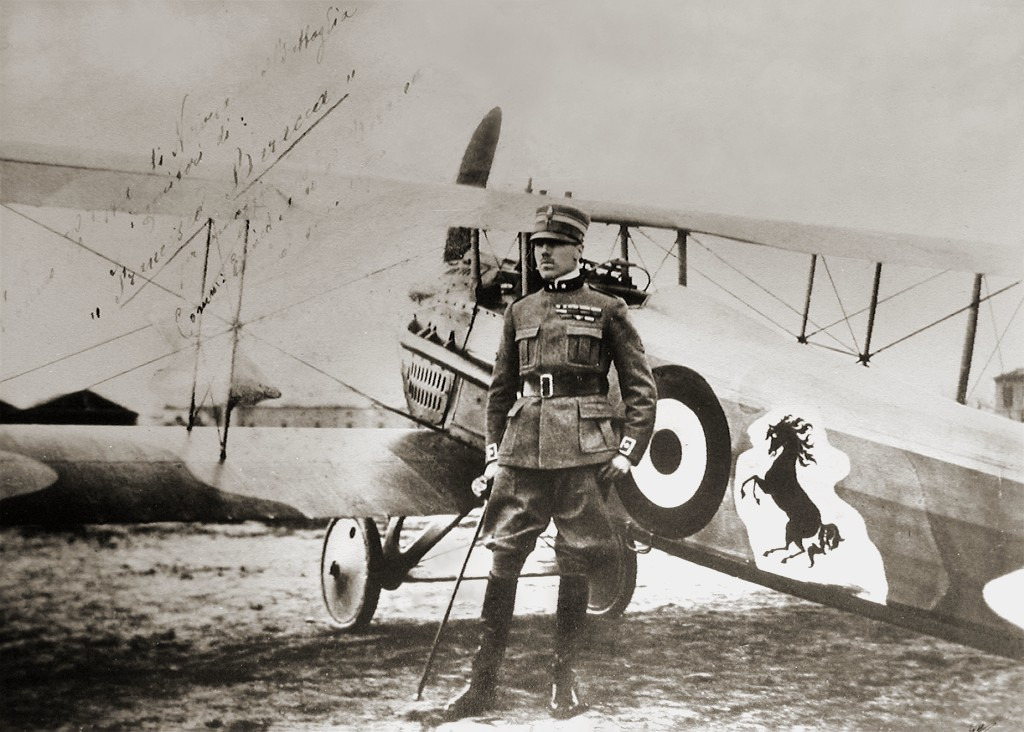
Francesco Baracca and his SPAD S.VII, with the cavallino rampante that inspired the Ferrari emblem

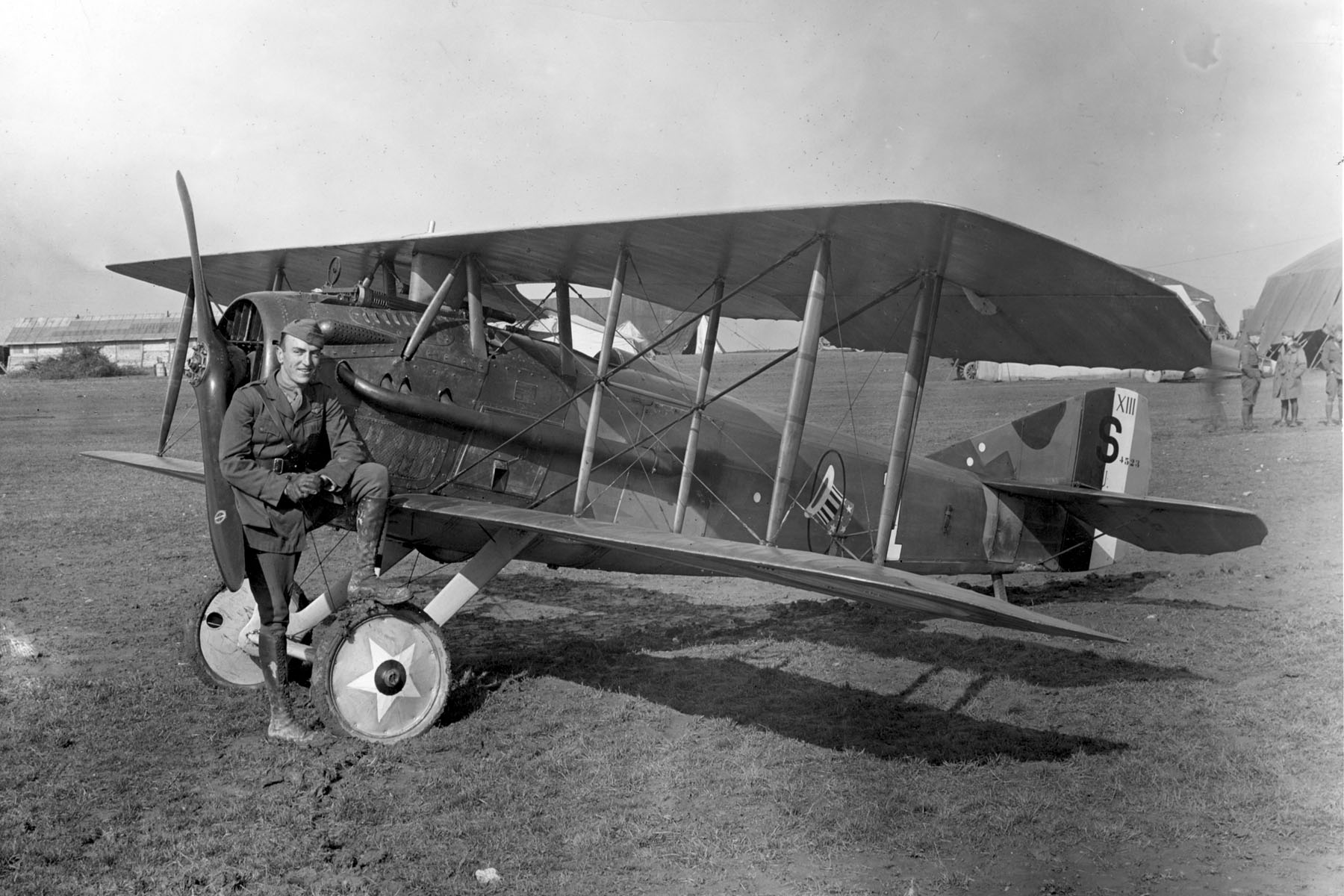
Eddie Rickenbacker with SPAD XIII (note the "Hat in the Ring" 94th Aero Squadron insignia), France, 1918

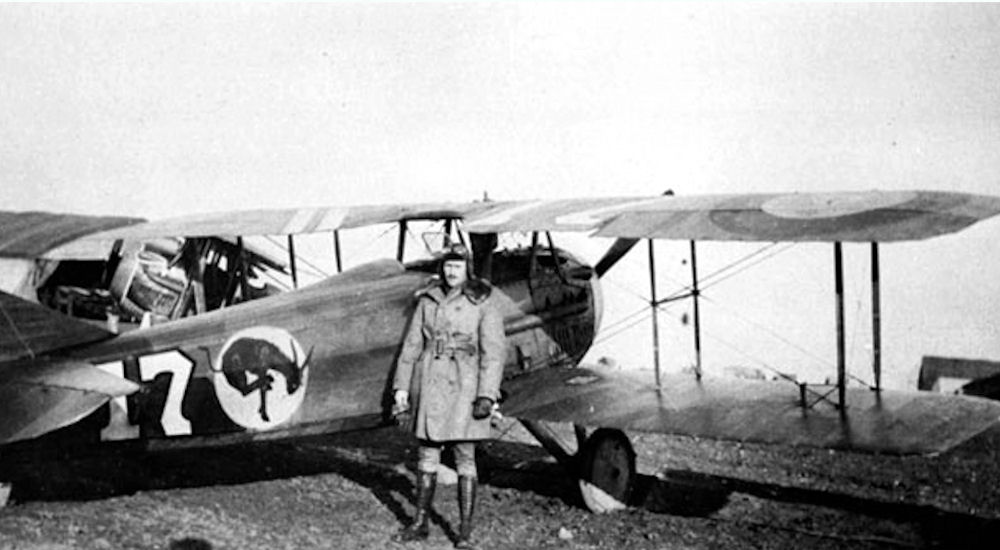
Spad XIII pursuit aircraft of the 95th Aero Squadron with the "Kicking Mule" insignia, France, 1918

=== World War II ===
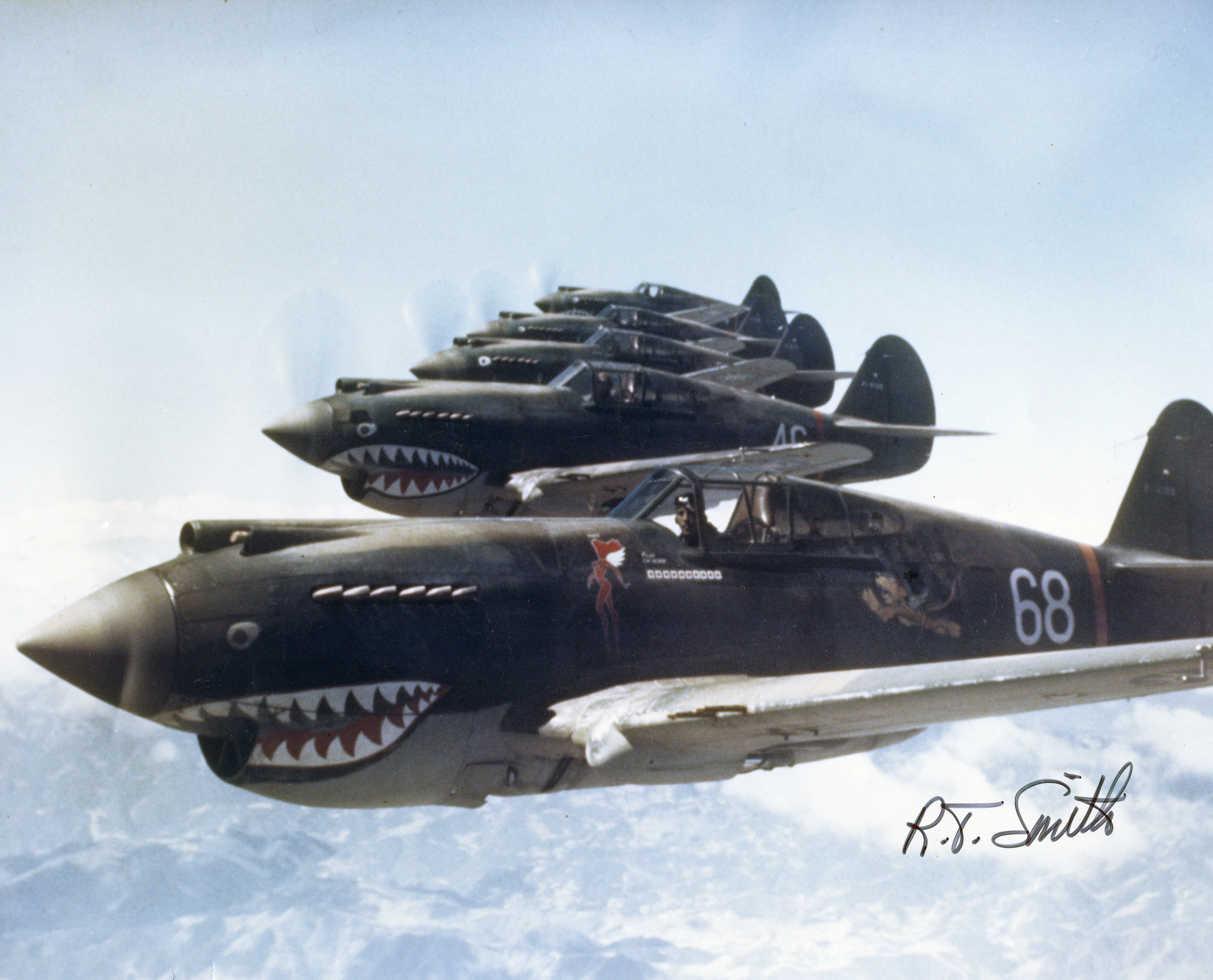
Hell's Angels, the 3rd Squadron of the 1st American Volunteer Group "Flying Tigers", 28 May 1942

True nose art appeared during World War II, which is considered by many observers to be the golden age of the genre, with both Axis and Allied pilots taking part. At the height of the war, nose artists were in very high demand in the USAAF and were paid quite well for their services, while AAF commanders tolerated nose art in an effort to boost aircrew morale. The U.S. Navy, by contrast, prohibited nose art, the most extravagant being limited to a few simply-lettered names, while nose art was uncommon in the Royal Air Force and Royal Canadian Air Force. The work was done by professional civilian artists as well as talented amateur servicemen. In 1941, for instance, the 39th Pursuit Squadron commissioned a Bell Aircraft artist to design and paint the "Cobra in the Clouds" logo on their aircraft.

Perhaps the most enduring nose art of World War II was the shark-face motif, which first appeared on the Messerschmitt Bf 110s of Luftwaffe Zerstörergeschwader 76 ("76th Heavy Fighter Wing") over Crete, where the twin-engined Messerschmitts outmatched the Gloster Gladiator biplanes of No. 112 Squadron RAF. The Commonwealth pilots were withdrawn to Egypt and refitted with Curtiss Tomahawks (P-40) off the same assembly line building fighter aircraft for the American Volunteer Group (AVG) Flying Tigers being recruited for service in China. In November 1941, AVG pilots saw a color photo in a newspaper of a shark mouth painted on a 112 Squadron P-40 fighter in North Africa and immediately adopted the shark-face motif for their own P-40Bs. The British version itself was inspired by "sharkmouth" nose art (without any eyes) on the Messerschmitt Bf 110 heavy fighters of Zerstörergeschwader 76. This work was done by the pilots and ground crew in the field. However, the insignia for the "Flying Tigers" – a winged Bengal tiger jumping through a stylized V for Victory symbol – was developed by graphic artists from the Walt Disney Company.

Similarly, when in 1943 the 39th Fighter Squadron became the first American squadron in their theatre with 100 kills, they adopted the shark-face for their Lockheed P-38 Lightnings. The shark-face is still used to this day, most commonly seen on the Fairchild Republic A-10 Thunderbolt II (with its gaping maw leading up to the muzzle of the aircraft's GAU-8 Avenger 30mm cannon), especially those of the 23d Fighter Group, the AVG's descendent unit, and a testament to its popularity as a form of nose art.

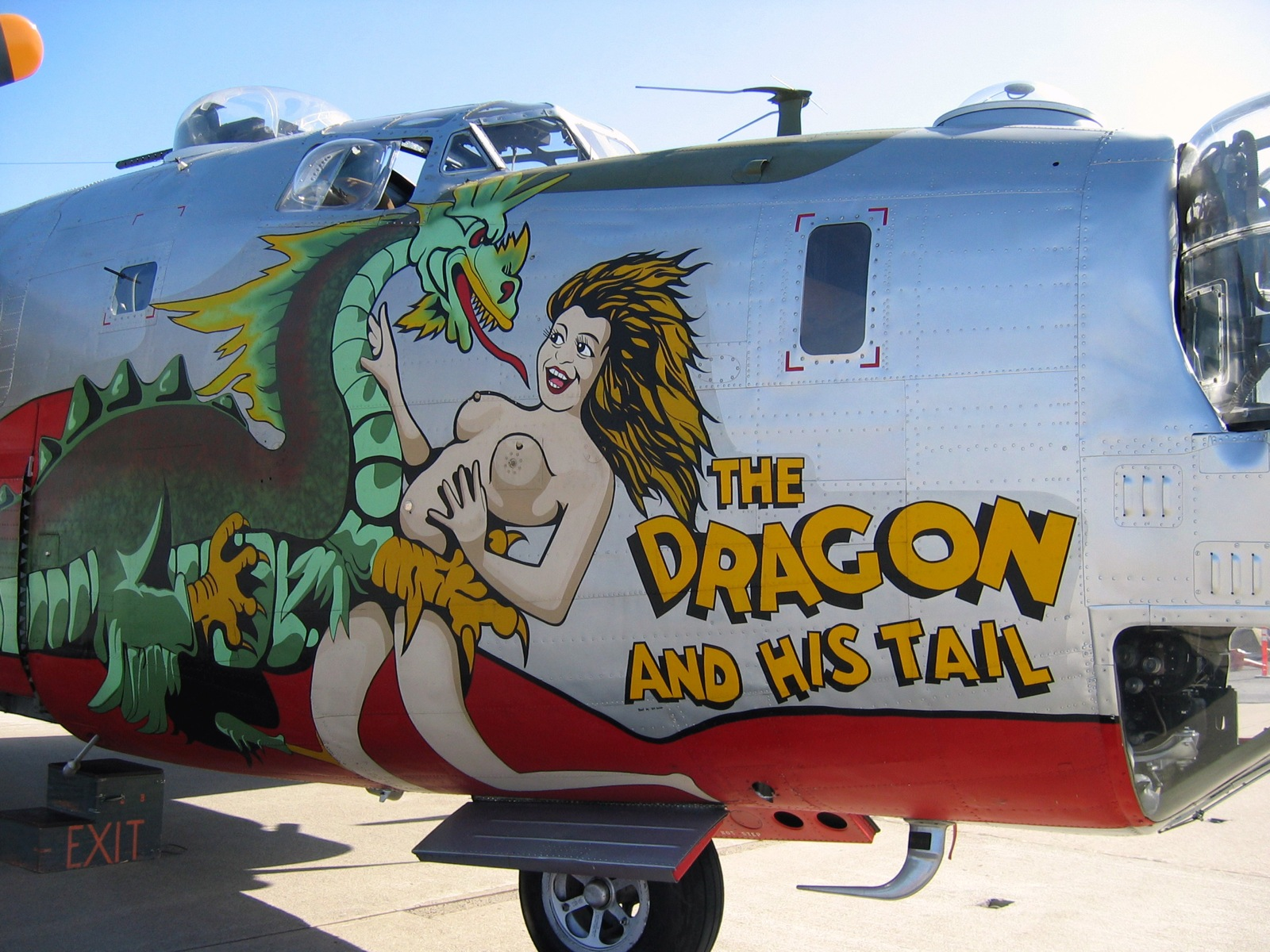
The "Dragon and His Tail" nose art on a B-24 Liberator, Moffett Field, 2004 – from 2005-on, Witchcraft (s/n 44-44052)

The largest known work of nose art depicted on a World War II-era American combat aircraft was on a Consolidated B-24 Liberator, tail number 44-40973, which had been named "The Dragon and his Tail" of the USAAF Fifth Air Force 64th Bomb Squadron, 43d Bomb Group, in the Southwest Pacific, flown by a crew led by Joseph Pagoni, with Staff Sergeant Sarkis Bartigian as the artist. The dragon artwork ran from the nose just forward of the cockpit, down the entire length of the fuselage's sides, with the dragon's body depicted directly below and just aft of the cockpit, with the dragon holding a nude woman in its forefeet.

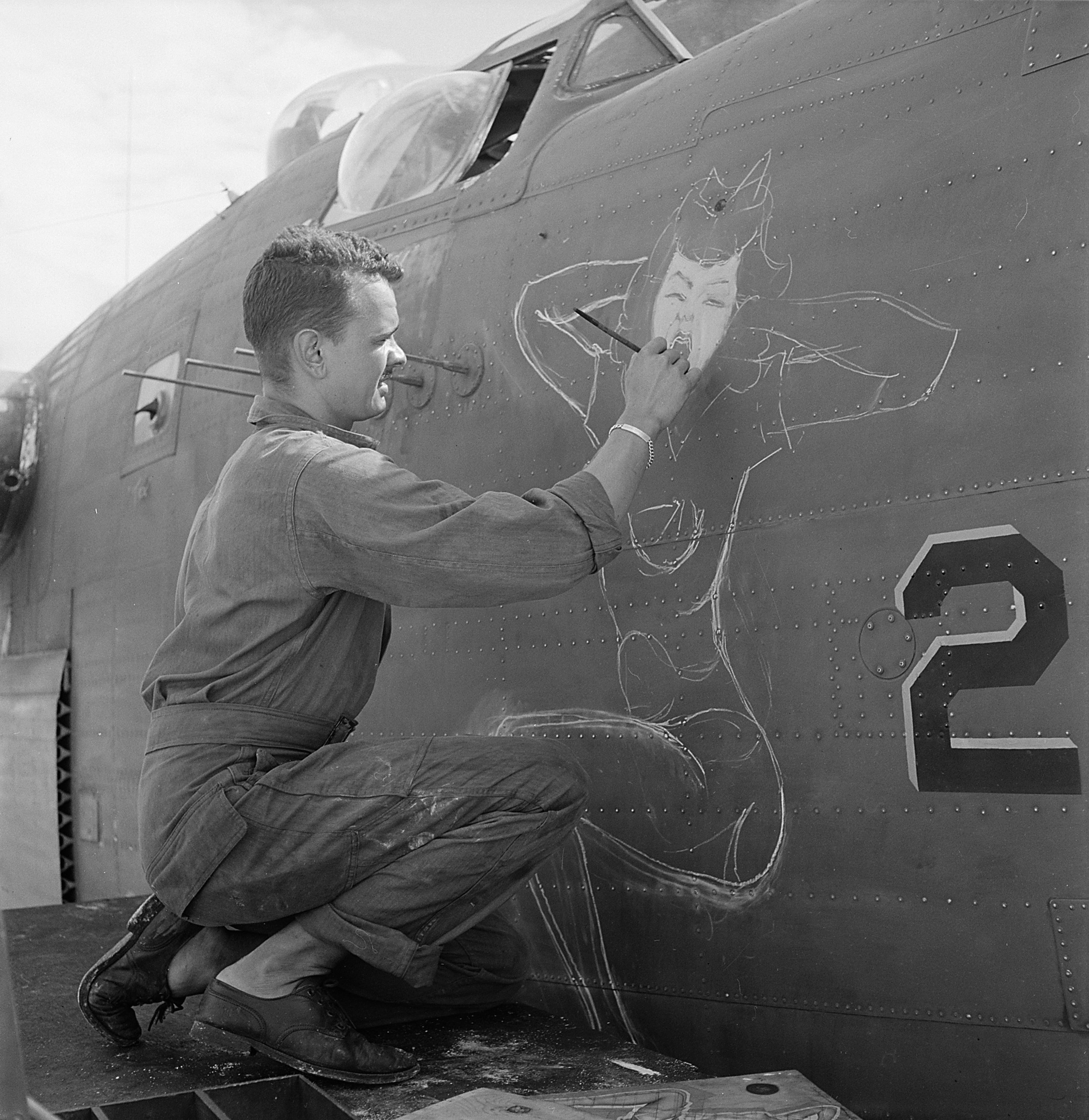
Sgt. J.S. Wilson painting a bomber based at Eniwetok in June 1944

Tony Starcer was the resident artist for the 91st Bomb Group (Heavy), one of the initial six groups fielded by the Eighth Air Force. Starcer painted over a hundred pieces of renowned B-17 nose art, including "Memphis Belle". A commercial artist named Brinkman, from Chicago was responsible for the zodiac-themed nose art of the B-24 Liberator-equipped 834th Bomb Squadron, based at RAF Sudbury, England.

Contemporary research demonstrates that bomber crews, who suffered high casualty rates during World War II, often developed strong bonds with the planes they were flying, and affectionately decorated them with nose art. It was also believed by the flight crews that the nose art was bringing luck to the planes.

The artistic work of Alberto Vargas and George Petty's pin-up models from Esquire Magazine were often duplicated, or adapted, by air force crews and painted on the nose of American and allied aircraft during World War II.

Some nose art was commemorative or intended to honor certain people, such as the Boeing B-29 Superfortress "The Ernie Pyle".

=== Post-World War II ===
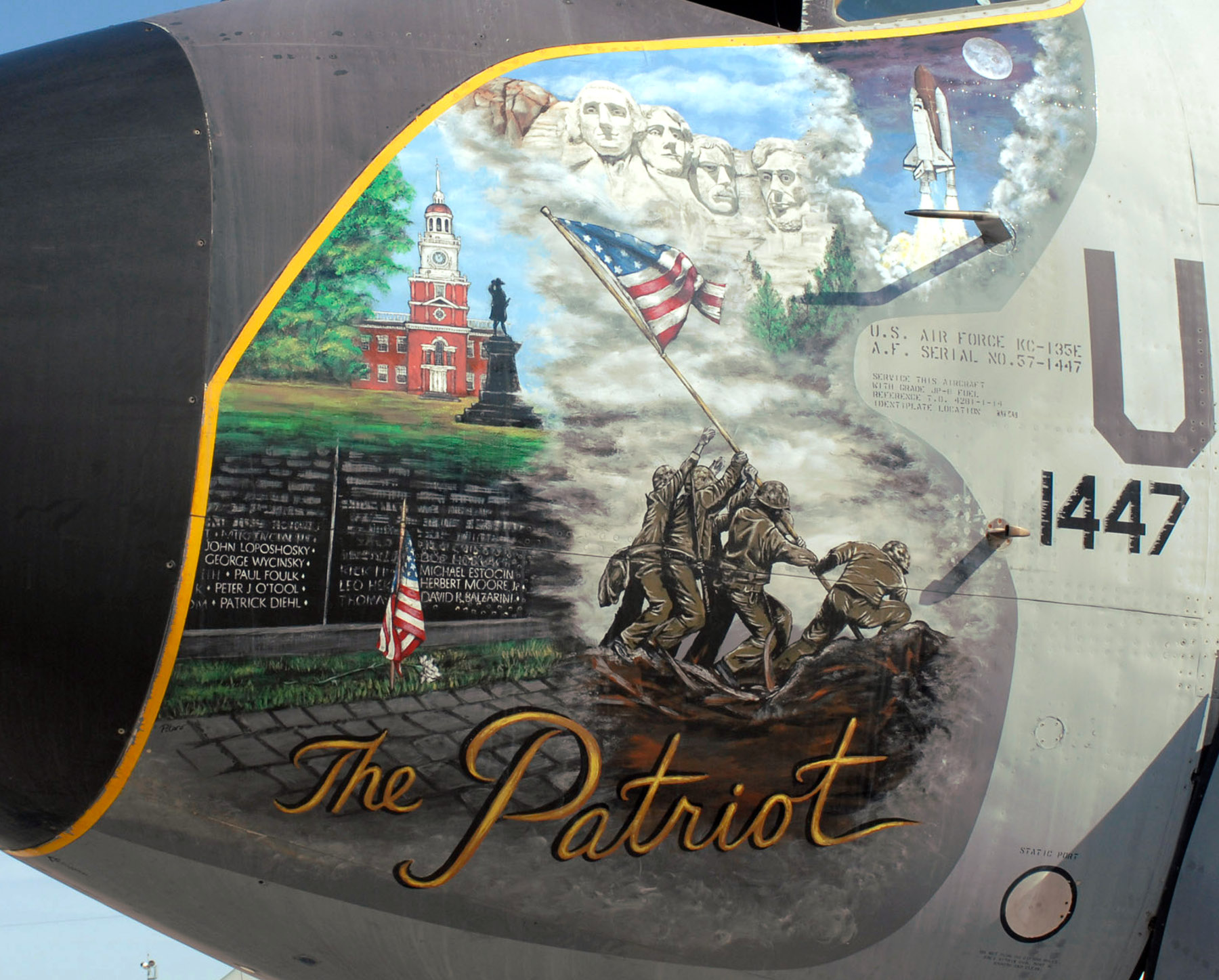
Boeing KC-135E Stratotanker, based with Sioux City Air National Guard, 2007.

In the Korean War, nose art was popular with units operating A-26 Invader and B-29 bombers, C-119 Flying Boxcar transports, as well as USAF fighter-bombers. Due to changes in military policies and changing attitudes toward the representation of women, the amount of nose art declined after the Korean War.

During the Vietnam War, Lockheed AC-130 gunships of the U.S. Air Force Special Operations Squadrons were often given names with accompanying nose art – for example, "Thor", "Azrael – Angel of Death", "Ghost Rider", "War Lord" and "The Arbitrator." The unofficial gunship badge of a flying skeleton with a Minigun was also applied to many aircraft until the end of the war and was later adopted officially. In addition, Army and Navy helicopter crews often embellished their assigned aircraft with a wide range of nose art and other personalized markings.

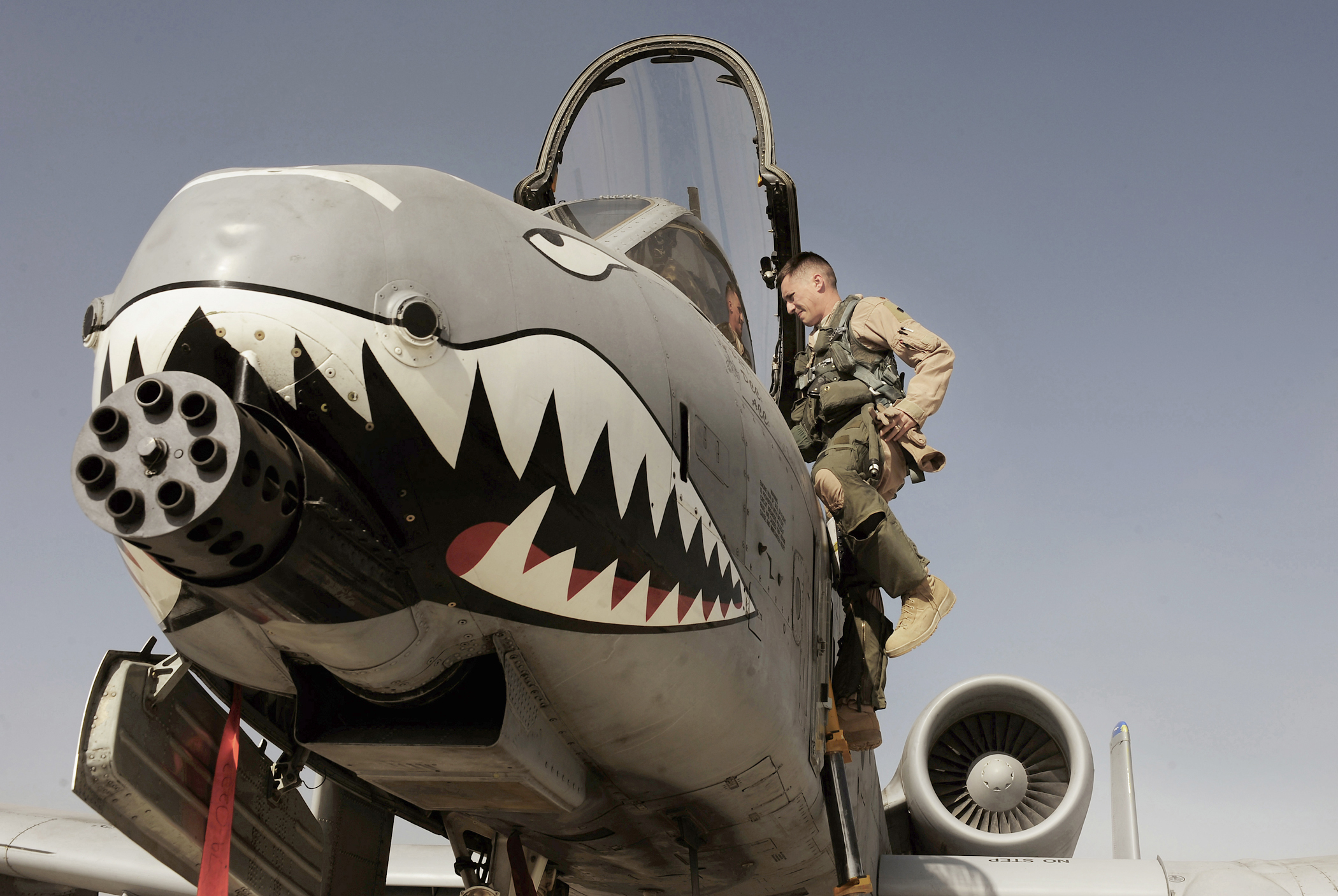
A-10 Thunderbolt II with shark mouth themed nose art, Kandahar Airfield, Afghanistan, 2011

Nose art underwent a revival during the Gulf War and has become more common since Operation Enduring Freedom and the Iraq War began. A-10 Thunderbolt II aircraft ladder doors are frequently painted while many fixed and rotary air crews are merging artwork as part of camouflage patterns. The United States Air Force had unofficially sanctioned the return of the pin-up (albeit fully clothed) with the Strategic Air Command permitting nose art on its bomber force in the Command's last years. The continuation of historic names such as "Memphis Belle" was encouraged.

In many other cases at airfields throughout the Middle East during the war on terror, aviation units instead painted the reinforced concrete T-walls and Bremer barriers that protected the aircrews and aircraft with elaborate murals and graffiti.

== Regional variation ==
Source material for American nose art was varied, ranging from pinups such as Rita Hayworth and Betty Grable and cartoon characters such as Donald Duck, Bugs Bunny, and Popeye to patriotic characters (Yankee Doodle) and fictional heroes (Sam Spade). Lucky symbols such as dice and playing cards also inspired nose art, along with references to mortality such as the Grim Reaper. Cartoons and pinups were most popular among American artists, but other works included animals, nicknames, hometowns, and popular song and movie titles. Some nose art and slogans expressed contempt for the enemy, especially of their leaders.

The farther the planes and crew were from headquarters or from the public eye, the racier the art tended to be. For instance, nudity was more common in nose art on aircraft in the Pacific than on aircraft in Europe.

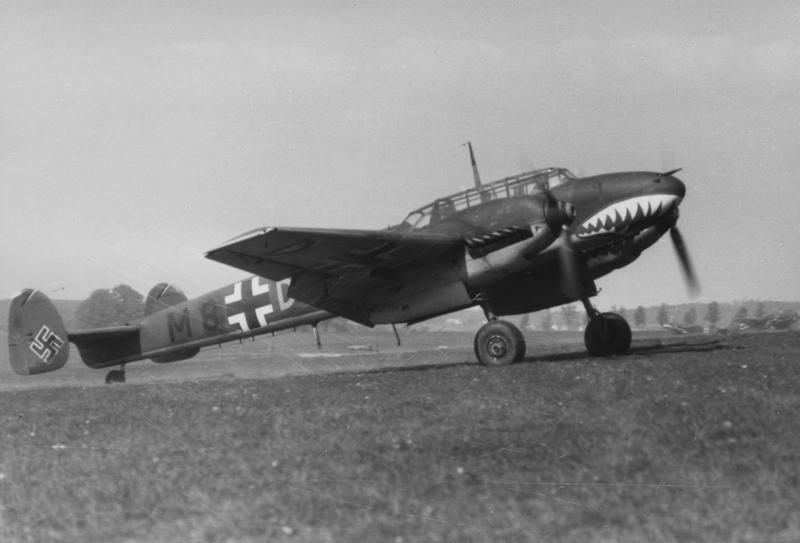
"Sharkmouth" Messerschmitt Bf 110C of ZG 76, May 1940

Luftwaffe aircraft did not often display nose art, but there were exceptions. For example, Mickey Mouse adorned a Condor Legion Messerschmitt Bf 109 during the Spanish Civil War and one Ju 87A was decorated with a large pig inside a white circle during the same period. Adolf Galland's Bf-109E-3 of JG 26 also had a depiction of Mickey Mouse, holding a contemporary telephone in his hands, in mid-1941. A Ju 87B-1 (Geschwaderkennung of S2+AC) of Stab II/St. G 77, piloted by Major Alfons Orthofer and based in Breslau-Schöngarten during the invasion of Poland, was painted with a shark's mouth, and some Bf 110s were decorated with furious wolf's heads, stylistic wasps (as with SKG 210 and ZG 1), or as in the case of ZG 76, the shark mouths that inspired both the RAF's 112 Squadron and in turn the Flying Tigers in China, on their noses or engine covers. Another example was Erich Hartmann's Bf-109G-14, "Lumpi", with an eagle's head. The fighter wing Jagdgeschwader 54 was known as the Grünherz (Green Hearts) after their fuselage emblem, a large green heart. The Geschwader was originally formed in Thüringen, nicknamed "the green heart of Germany". Perhaps the flashiest Luftwaffe nose art was the red and white viper snake insignia running through the whole fuselage of certain Junkers Ju 87 Stuka dive bombers that served with the II Gruppe, and especially the 6. Staffel of Sturzkampfgeschwader 2 in North Africa campaign, the only known artwork on an Axis-flown combat aircraft that could have rivaled the length of that on "The Dragon and his Tail" B-24.

The Soviet Air Forces decorated their planes with historical images, mythical beasts, and patriotic slogans.

The attitude of the Finnish Air Force to the nose art varied by unit. Some units disallowed nose art, while others tolerated it. Generally, the Finnish airforce nose art was humorous or satirical, such as the "horned Stalin" on Maj. Maunula's Curtiss P-36 fighter.

The Japan Air Self-Defense Force has decorated fighter aircraft with Valkyrie-themed characters under the names Mystic Eagle and Shooting Eagle.

Beginning in 2011, the Japan Ground Self-Defense Force has AH-1S Cobra anti-tank helicopters and Kawasaki OH-1 observation helicopter named Ita-Cobra and Ita-Omega respectively, decorated in the theme of 4 Kisarazu (木更津) sisters (Akane (木更津茜), Aoi (木更津葵), Wakana (木更津若菜), Yuzu (木更津柚子)). The Aoi-chan first appeared in 2011, followed by the other three sisters in 2012.

Canadian Forces were reported having nose art on CH-47D Chinook and CH-146 Griffon helicopters in Afghanistan.

== Famous examples ==
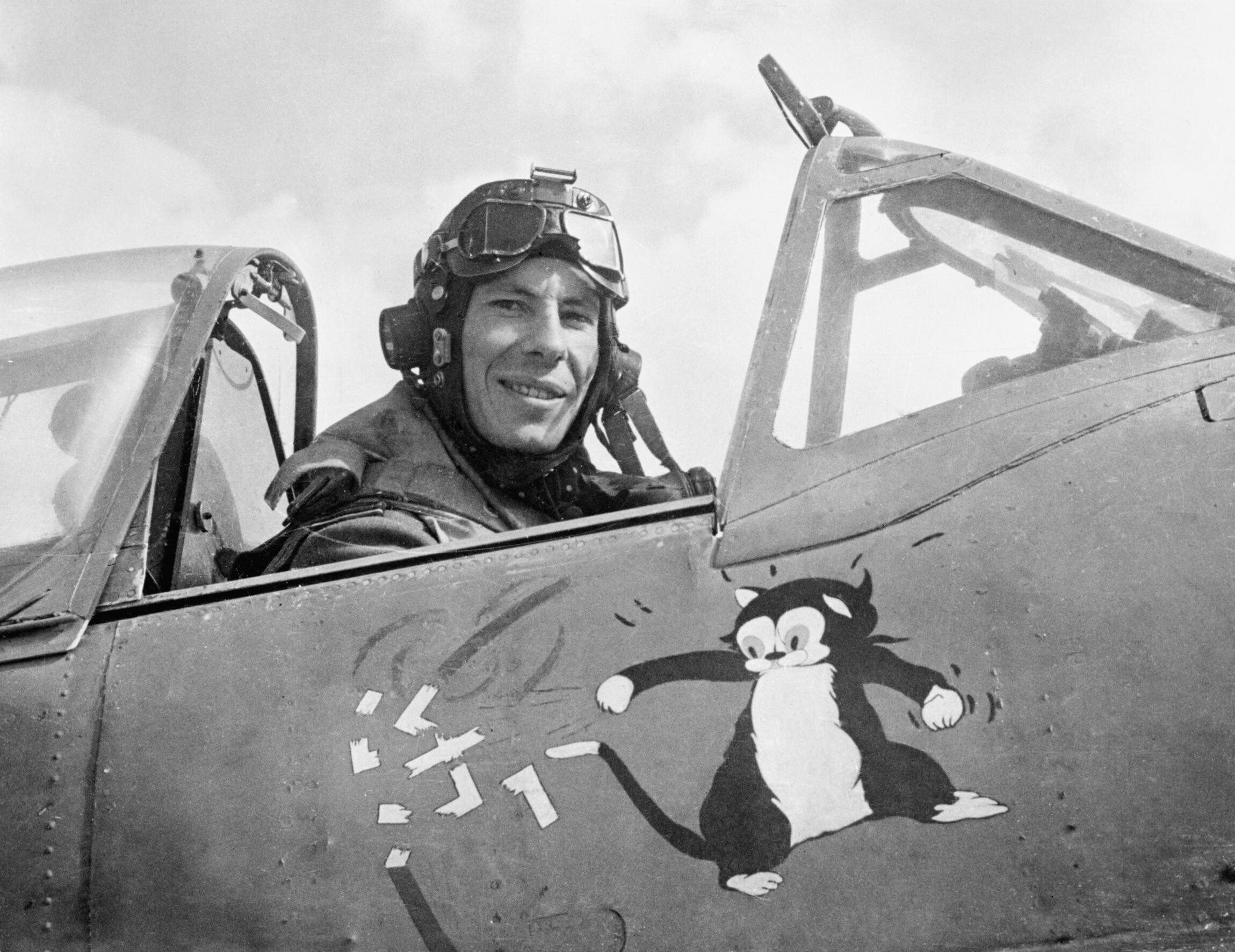
Ian Gleed in his plane with Figaro the Cat

- Pierre Clostermann's Hawker Tempest Le Grand Charles featured the Cross of Lorraine.
- Brendan Finucane's Spitfires wore a shamrock with a "B" within it. Ireland's top ace in World War Two also was the youngest wing commander in Royal Air Force history.
- Adolf Galland was famous for painting Mickey Mouse on his aircraft, and the mascot was adopted by his Gruppe during the early airwar phase of World War II.
- Don Gentile's North American P-51 Mustang named "Shangri-La", with an eagle sporting boxing gloves.
- Ian Gleed's Hawker Hurricanes and Supermarine Spitfire featured Figaro the Cat, from the 1940 Disney animated movie Pinocchio.
- Erich Hartmann's Bf 109s featured a distinctive "black tulip" design on the very front of the cowling, immediately behind the spinner.
- Johnny Johnson's Supermarine Spitfire Mk.IX featured the Canadian maple leaf.
- John D. Landers' P-51D, which sported a distinctive black-and-white checkerboard with red trim.
- Ted W. Lawson, who (along with journalist Bob Considine) famously wrote about the 1942 Doolittle Raid in Thirty Seconds Over Tokyo, piloted a North American B-25 Mitchell bomber nicknamed The Ruptured Duck, after a minor training accident in which the aircraft tail scraped the ground during takeoff; this was decorated by a caricature of an angry Donald Duck figure with crutches and wearing a pilot's headphones.
- James MacLachlan, who flew with an artificial arm, had his Hawker Hurricane adorned with a picture of his amputated arm giving a V sign.
- Werner Mölders flew a yellow-nosed Messerschmitt Bf 109F-2 while with JG 51 during June 1941.
- Chuck Yeager's series of aircraft named "Glamorous Glennis", with bright letter art.

The markings of aces were often adopted by their squadrons, such as Galland's Mickey Mouse and Hartmann's black tulip (still in use until recently on the aircraft of JG 71 "Richthofen" – not known to be in use on the unit's new Eurofighter Typhoons).

== Similar art ==
Designs similar to aviation nose art could be found during World War II on some British torpedo boats, and German and US submarines. Similar designs can also be found on some HIMARS-equipped FMTVs in the service of the Armed Forces of Ukraine during the Russian invasion.

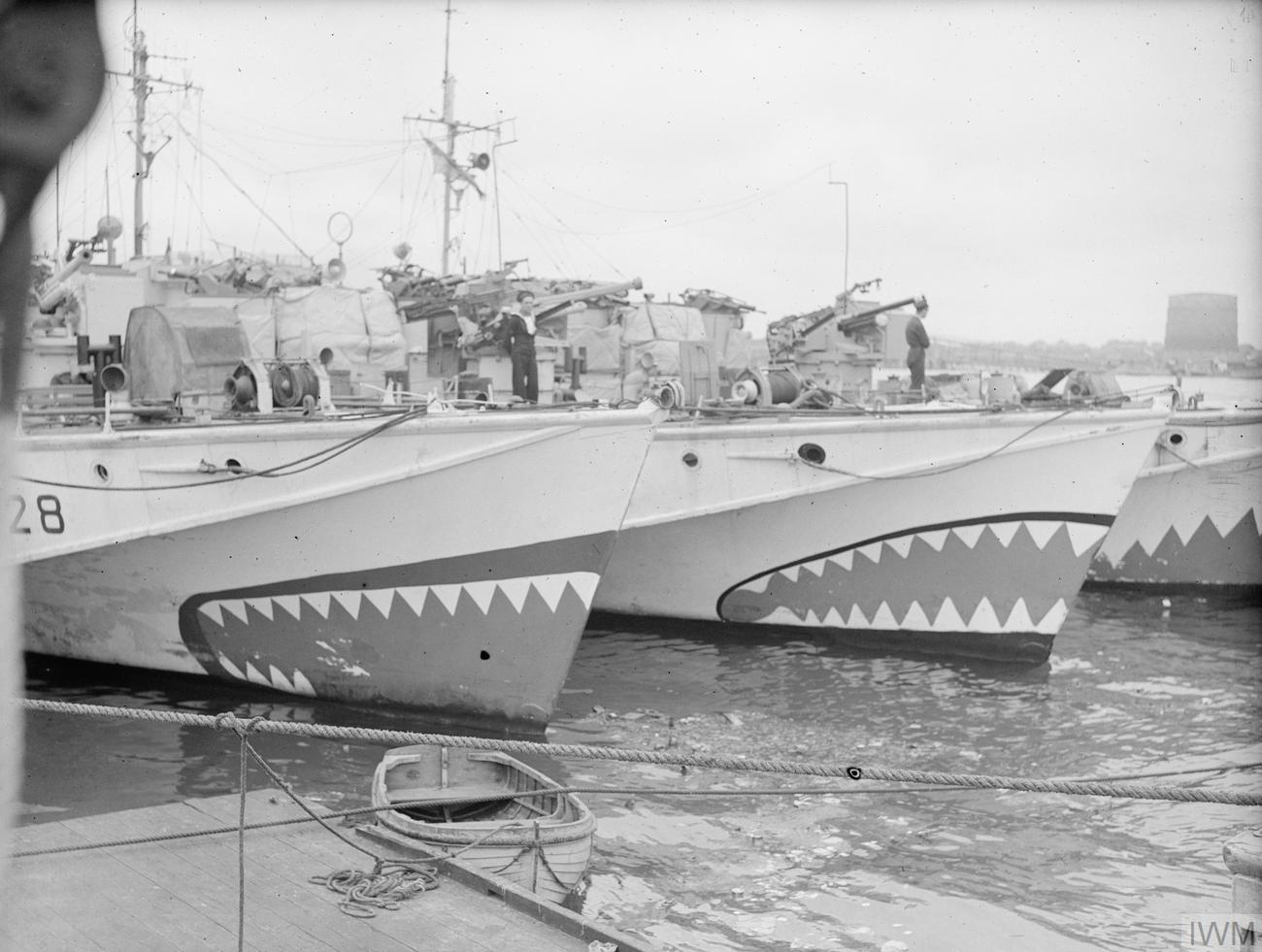
Royal Navy Motor Torpedo Boats decorated with shark mouths, June 1944

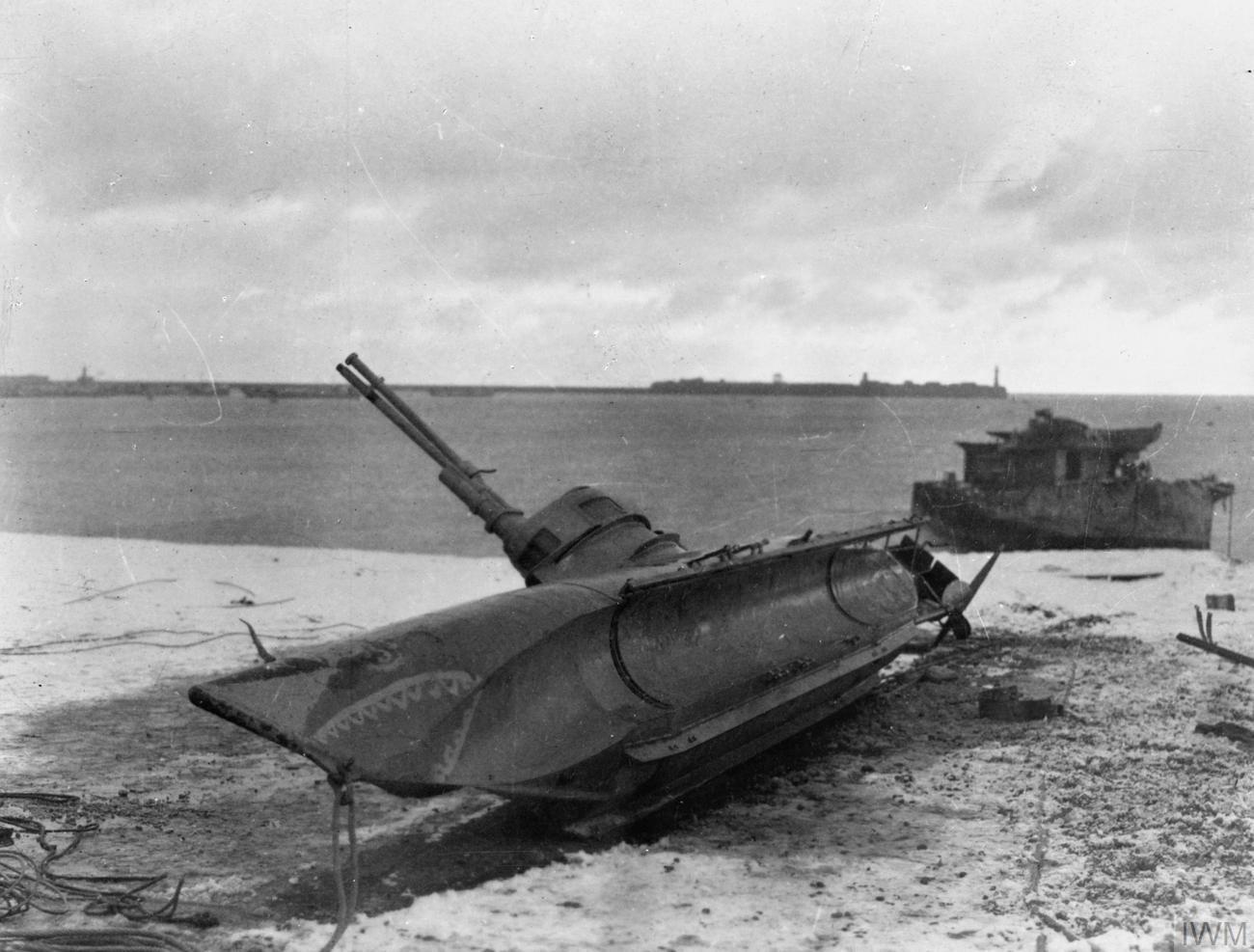
A captured German Biber midget submarine with a shark-mouth design

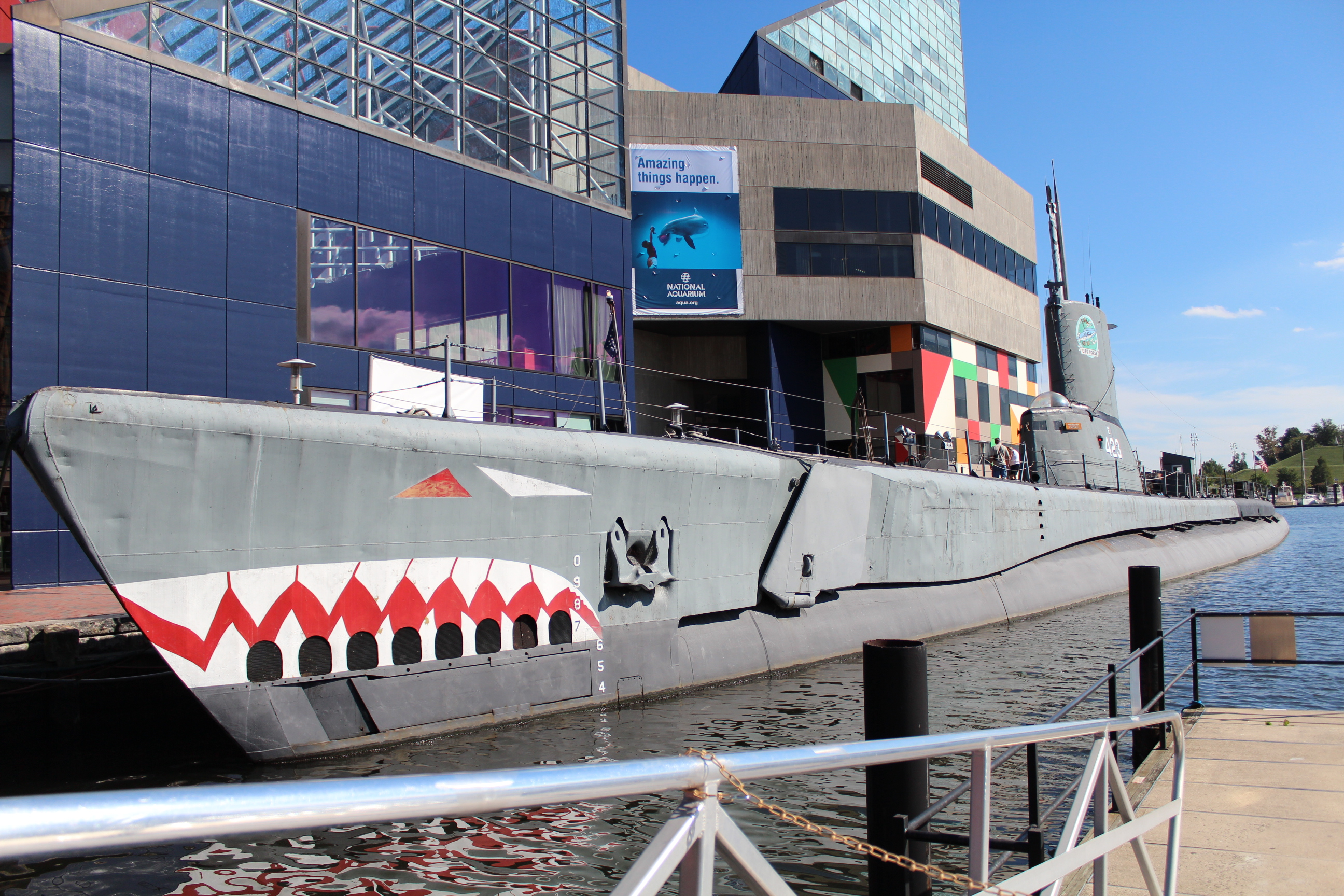
USS Torsk, a World War II submarine, now one of the Historic Ships in Baltimore

== Regulation ==
=== United States ===
In 1993 the United States Air Force Air Mobility Command ordered that all nose art should be gender-neutral.

A 2015 US Air Force memorandum stated that nose art must be "distinctive, symbolic, gender neutral, intended to enhance unit pride, designed in good taste." Furthermore, it must not contravene copyright and trademark laws.

== See also ==
- Aircraft livery
- Victory marking, a similar practice often applied on the aircraft's nose

== Bibliography ==
- Bloomfield, Gary L., Stacie L. Shain, & Arlen C. Davidson. Duty, honor, applause : America's entertainers in World War II. Guilford, CN: Lyon's Press, 2004. ISBN 1-59228-550-3. (pp. 400–405 discuss pin-up girl and nose art.)
- Bredau, Robert (1989). The Meaning of Nose Art: An Anthropological Perspective (Thesis). California State University.
- Campbell, John M. & Campbell, Donna. War paint : fighter nose art from WWII & Korea. Osceola, WI: Motorbooks International, 1990.
- Chinnery, Philip. 50 years of the desert boneyard : Davis Monthan A.F.B., Arizona. Osceola, WI: Motorbooks, International, 1995.
- Cohan, Phil. "Risque Business." Air and Space 5 (Apr.–May 1990): 62–71.
- Davis, Larry. Planes, Names and Dames: 1940–1945. Vol. 1. Carrollton, TX: Squadron/Signal Publications, 1990.
- Davis, Larry. Planes, Names and Dames: 1946–1960. Vol. 2. Carrollton, TX: Squadron/Signal Publications, 1990.
- Davis, Larry. Planes, Names and Dames: 1955–1975. Vol. 3. Carrollton, TX: Squadron/Signal Publications, 1990.
- Dorr, Robert F. Fighting Colors: Glory Days of U.S. Aircraft Markings. Osceola, WI: Motorbooks International, 1990.
- Ethell, Jeffrey L. The History of Aircraft Nose Art: World War I to Today. Osceola, WI: Motorbooks International, 1991.
- Ford, Daniel. Flying Tigers: Claire Chennault and His American Volunteers, 1941–1942. Washington, DC: HarperCollins–Smithsonian Books, 2007. ISBN 0-06-124655-7.
- Fugere, Jerry. Desert Storm B-52 Nose Art. Tucson, AZ: J. Fugere, 1999.
- Ketley, Barry. Luftwaffe emblems. Manchester: Flight Recorder Publications, 2012.
- Logan, Ian. Classy Chassy. New York: W. W. Visual Library, 1977.
- March, Peter R. Desert Warpaint. London: Osprey Aerospace, 1992.
- McDowell, Ernest R. The P-40 Kittyhawk at War. New York: Arco Publishing, 1968.
- O'Leary, Michael D. "Disney Goes to War!" Air Classics 32, no. 5 (1996): 40–42, 45–51.
- Schellinger, Andretta F. "Aircraft Nose Art: American, French, and British Imagery and its influence from World War I through the Vietnam War", Jefferson, NC: McFarland, 2015 ISBN 9780786497713.
- Schellinger, Andretta F. From Knights to Skulls: The Cultural Evolution of Nose Artwork. The Dalles, OR: Schellinger Research Publishing, 2013. ISBN 978-1493606375.
- Tullis, Thomas A. Tigers over China : camouflage, markings, and squadron insignia of the American Volunteer Group's aircraft in China, 1941–42. Hamilton, MT: Eagle Editions, 2001.
- Valant, Gary M. Classic Vintage Nose Art. Ann Arbor, MI: Lowe and B. Hould (an imprint of Borders, Inc.), 1997. ISBN 0-681-22744-3.
- Velasco, Gary. Fighting Colors: The Creation of Military Aircraft Nose Art. Turner Publishing, 2004.
- Walker, Randy. Painted Ladies. West Chester, PA: Schiffer Publishing, 1992.
- Walker, Randy. More painted ladies : modern military aircraft nose-art & unusual markings. Atglen, PA: Schiffer Publishing, 1994.
- Ward, Richard. Sharkmouth, 1916–1945. New York: Arco, 1979.
- Wayland, Kent (2014). ""It's Not an Airplane, It's My Baby": Using a Gender Metaphor to Make Sense of Old Warplanes in North America". In Lipset, David; Handler, Richard (eds.). Vehicles: Cars, Canoes, and Other Metaphors of Moral Imagination (First Paperback ed.). New York: Berghahn Books. pp. 69–87. ISBN 9781782383765.
- Wesemann, Terri (2019). Metal Storytellers: Reflections of War Culture in Silverplate B-29 Nose Art from the 509th Composite Group (Thesis). Utah State University.
