= 676th Bombardment Squadron =

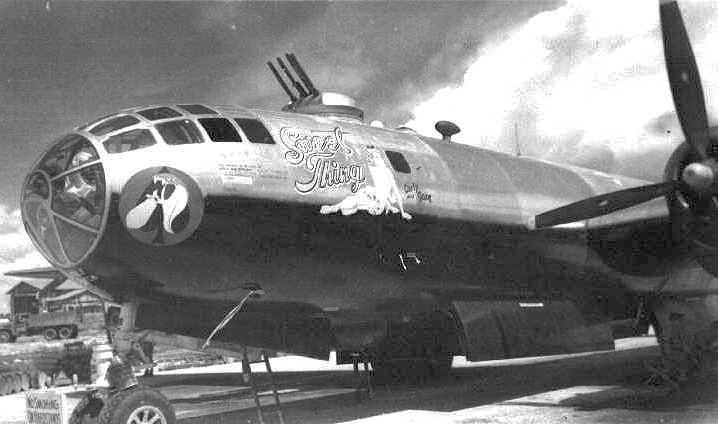
- 44th Bombardment Group B-29 Superfortress (Note: Aircraft is Boeing B-29-80-BW Superfortress, serial 44-70108 Sweet Thing. This airplane was reclaimed on 21 July 1954. In 1956, it was transferred to the United States Navy, which used it as a target at Naval Air Weapons Station China Lake. Baugher, Joe (10 May 2023). "1944 USAF Serial Numbers". Joe Baugher. It set a speed record from Hawaii to California on its return to the United States.)
- Active: 1943-1946
- Country: United States
- Branch: United States Air Force
- Role: Heavy bomber
- Nickname: The Reluctant Dragon
- Engagements: American Theater of World War II; China Burma India Theater; Pacific Theater of Operations
- Decorations: Distinguished Unit Citation

Insignia
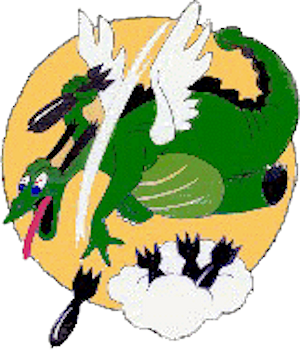
- 676th Bombardment Squadron Emblem (Note: Approved 27 June 1945. Description: Over and through a yellow disc, the caricatured character "The Reluctant Dragon", light and dark green, winged light blue, in flight toward dexter, over a small, light blue cloud formation in base supporting three black aerial bombs, and hurling a small, black bomb with the left forepaw, while holding a like bomb in the right forepaw.)

The 676th Bombardment Squadron is a former unit of the United States Army Air Forces, last assigned to the 444th Bombardment Group at Davis-Monthan Field, Arizona.

During World War II, the squadron was part of the first Boeing B-29 Superfortress group formed for the 58th Bombardment Wing, and served in the China Burma India Theater and Pacific Ocean Theater as part of Twentieth Air Force. The squadron's aircraft engaged in very heavy bombardment operations against Japan. The squadron received the Distinguished Unit Citation for its combat operations on three occasions. When the unit was inactivated on 1 October 1946, its B-29 aircraft and personnel were reassigned to the 63d Bombardment Squadron.

== History ==
=== Training for combat ===
The squadron was first activated as the 676th Bombardment Squadron on 1 March 1943 at Davis-Monthan Field, Arizona, one of the original squadrons of the 444th Bombardment Group. The 444th was assigned to the first B-29 Superfortress wing, the 58th Bombardment Wing. After a period of organization at Davis-Monthan the squadron moved to Great Bend Army Air Field, Kansas. for training, initially flying Boeing B-17 Flying Fortresses, Consolidated B-24 Liberators and Martin B-26 Marauders. The group engaged in training on the new aircraft and its mission of long range precision bombing. At Great Bend, the squadron received early model B-29s and prototype YB-29s, however aircraft were still undergoing development and were frequently modified by Boeing technicians in the field while the squadron was undergoing training in Kansas. In November 1943 The 444th reorganized as a very heavy group and added the 5th Bombardment Maintenance Squadron, which was paired with the 676th to maintain its B-29s.

=== China Burma India Theater ===
In early April 1944, the squadron left the United States and deployed to a former Liberator base at Charra Airfield, India. The first airplane of the 444th group landed at Charra on 11 April 1944. Due to the lack of revetments at Charra the squadron's airplanes were parked wingtip to wingtip on the field's shorter runway. Charra served only as a maintenance and staging base. Its runways were too short for a B-29 to take off fully loaded. While the squadron was stationed there, all missions were flown from the bases of the other bombardment groups of the 58th Bombardment Wing.

From India, the 676th planned to fly missions against Japan from advanced airfields in China. However, all the supplies of fuel, bombs and spare parts needed to support operations from the forward bases in China had to be flown from India over The Hump. For this role, one aircraft from the squadron was stripped of combat equipment and used as a flying tanker. Each aircraft carried seven tons of fuel, but the amount that was delivered to China depended on weather, including headwinds and aircraft icing which increased the fuel consumption of the "tankers."

The squadron flew its first combat mission on 5 June 1944 against the Makasan railroad yards at Bangkok, Thailand. Ten days later the 676th participated in the first American air attack on the Japanese home islands since the 1942 Doolittle Raid, staging through Chinese bases on a nighttime raid against the iron and steel works at Yawata, Japan. It returned to Yawata on 20 August on a daytime raid for which the unit was awarded the Distinguished Unit Citation. Operating from bases in India and at times staging through fields in China, the unit struck transportation centers, naval installations, aircraft plants and other targets in Burma, China, Thailand, Japan and Formosa.

On 12 October 1944 the group reorganized. The 679th Bombardment Squadron and the four bombardment maintenance squadrons were disbanded and their personnel and equipment were transferred to 676th and the other squadrons of the group. As the new year started, Japanese advances forced withdrawal from the Chinese forward operating bases. Unable to continue attacks on Japan, the unit continued attacking targets in Southeast Asia.

=== Pacific Theater ===
In the spring of 1945 the 444th and the other groups of the 58th Wing moved to Tinian in the Marianas in order to continue operations against Japan. The group and squadron participated in the bombing of strategic objectives, strategic mining of the Inland Sea of Japan and in incendiary attacks on urban areas for the duration of the war. The 676th received a second Distinguished Unit Citation for attacking oil storage facilities at Oshima, bombing an aircraft plant near Kobe, and dropping incendiaries on Nagoya in May 1945. The squadron struck light metal industries at Osaka in July 1945, receiving a third Distinguished Unit Citation for this action. The squadrons's final mission was flown against Hikari, Japan on 14 August 1945, the day before the Japanese surrender.

=== Strategic Air Command ===
The 676th returned to the United States and Merced Army Air Field, California in November 1945 where it became part of Fourth Air Force of Continental Air Forces (CAF). CAF became Strategic Air Command (SAC) in March 1946 and the 676th was one of the first bombardment units assigned to SAC. In May the squadron moved back to Davis-Monthan Field, where it was integrated with the host 248th AAF Base Unit. The 676th inactivated on 1 October 1946 and its personnel and aircraft were reassigned to units of the 43d Bombardment Group, which was activated at Davis-Monthan on that day as part of the re-established Eighth Air Force.

== Lineage ==
- Constituted as the 676th Bombardment Squadron (Heavy) on 15 February 1943

Activated on 1 March 1943
Redesignated 676th Bombardment Squadron (Heavy) (B-29) on 26 April 1943
Redesignated 676th Bombardment Squadron, Very Heavy on 20 November 1943
Inactivated on 1 October 1946

=== Assignments ===
- 444th Bombardment Group, 1 March 1943 – 1 October 1946

=== Stations ===
- Davis-Monthan Field, Arizona, 1 March 1943
- Great Bend Army Air Field, Kansas, 3 August 1943 – 12 March 1944
- Charra Airfield, India, c. 13 April 1944
- Dudhkundi Airfield, India, 1 July–April 1945
- West Field (Tinian), Northern Mariana Islands, April–27 October 1945
- Merced Army Air Field (later Castle Field), California, 15 November 1945
- Davis-Monthan Field, Arizona, 10 May–1 October 1946

=== Aircraft ===
- Consolidated B-24 Liberator, 1943
- Boeing B-17 Flying Fortress, 1943–1944
- Boeing YB-29 Superfortress, 1943–1944
- Boeing B-29 Superfortress, 1943–1946

== Awards and campaigns ==
Award streamer	Award	Dates	Notes
	Distinguished Unit Citation	20 August 1944	Yawata, Japan
	Distinguished Unit Citation	10–14 May 1945	Japan
	Distinguished Unit Citation	24 July 1945	Osaka, Japan

Campaign Streamer	Campaign	Dates	Notes
	American Theater of World War II|1 March 1943 – 12 March 1944		
	India-Burma	13 April 1944–April 1945	
	Central Burma	29 January 1945–April 1945	
	Air Offensive, Japan	13 April 1944 – 2 September 1945	
	China Defensive	13 April 1944 – 4 May 1945	
	Western Pacific	17 April 1945 – 2 September 1945	

== See also ==
- List of B-29 Superfortress operators
