= 909th Air Refueling Squadron =

US Air Force KC-135 squadron

909th Air Refueling Squadron

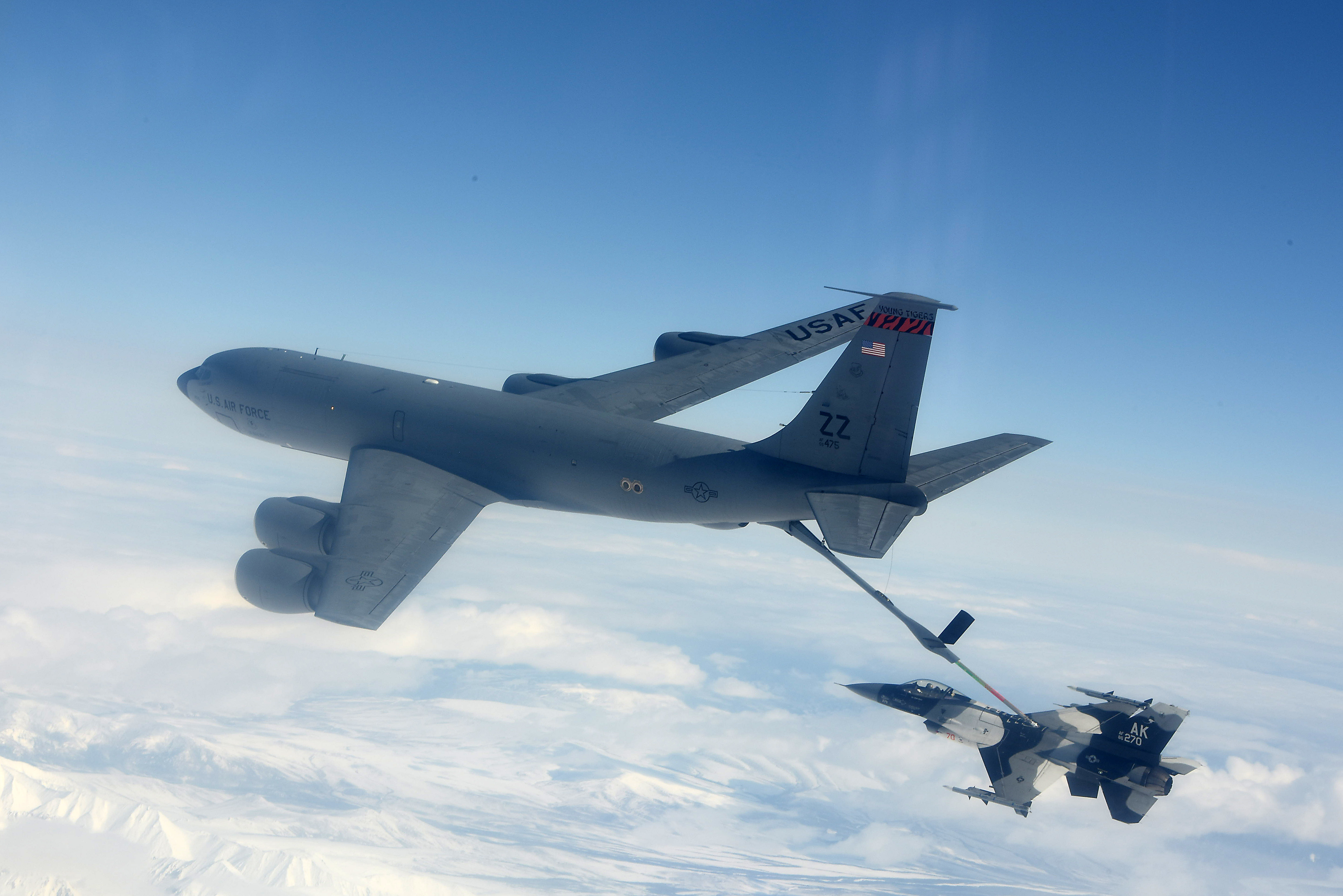
- A 909th Air Refueling Squadron Boeing KC-135R refuels an F-16 Fighting Falcon in 2018
- Active: 1942–1945; 1945–1946; 1963 – present
- Country: United States
- Branch: United States Air Force
- Role: Air Refueling
- Size: Squadron
- Part of: Pacific Air Forces
- Garrison/HQ: Kadena Air Base, Okinawa
- Motto: Always There
- Mascot: Young Tigers
- Engagements: Mediterranean Theater of Operations; European Theater of Operations
- Decorations: Distinguished Unit Citation; Air Force Outstanding Unit Award with Combat "V" Device; Republic of Vietnam Gallantry Cross with Palm

Insignia
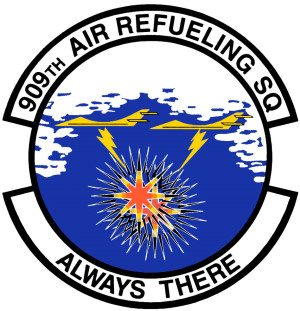
- 909th Air Refueling Squadron emblem (Note: Approved 2 December 1963, updated 7 November 1995. Description: On a disc divided into an Air Force blue sky and a white cloud formation with a narrow black border, two stylized yellow aircraft in horizontal flight each emitting a yellow thunderbolt to a double six-pointed star with orange center, yellow, and black tips giving off black rays. Endicott, p. 888.)
- KC-135 Tail Code: ZZ
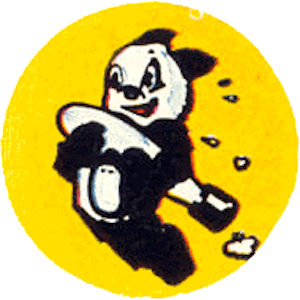
- 409th Bombardment Squadron emblem (Note: Approved 16 February 1943. Description: On a yellow disc, a caricatured panda bear, emitting three drops of perspiration proper and running with a large white aerial bomb, trimmed black grasped under left forepaw, point to dexter chief. Maurer, Combat Squadrons, pp. 500-501.)
- World War II Fuselage Code: YM
- World War II Tail Marking: Circle B

The 909th Air Refueling Squadron is part of the 18th Wing at Kadena Air Base, Japan. It operates the KC-135 Stratotanker aircraft conducting air refueling missions.

The squadron was first activated in 1942 as the 19th Reconnaissance Squadron, but was redesignated the 409th Bombardment Squadron shortly after activation. After briefly serving as an antisubmarine unit, it participated in combat in the Mediterranean and European Theaters of Operations, earning two Distinguished Unit Citations for its actions. After the surrender of Germany the squadron returned to the United States and was inactivated.

The squadron was reactivated shortly after the end of World War II as a Boeing B-29 Superfortress unit, and became one of the first units of Strategic Air Command in 1946. It was inactivated later that year when its parent group was replaced by the 43d Bombardment Group.

The 909th Air Refueling Squadron was activated in 1963 at Amarillo Air Force Base, Texas. The squadron supported Strategic Air Command operations from activation and, starting in 1964, supported operations in Southeast Asia from Amarillo, March Air Force Base, California and Kadena Air Base, Okinawa. After the end of the Vietnam War, the squadron continued to support refueling and reconnaissance operations in the Pacific. In 1985 the 409th and 909th squadrons were consolidated into a single unit. The squadron also provided support for combat operations in Southwest Asia during the 1990s.

== Mission ==
The 909th is the Pacific Air Forces (PACAF)'s "lead force" for air refueling U.S. and allied aircraft during contingencies. The squadron accomplishes aeromedical evacuations for military and civilian members, transporting patients to as far away as the United States when necessary. It also conducts Strategic Arms Reduction Treaty (START) and headquarters- and command-directed missions.

== History ==
=== World War II ===
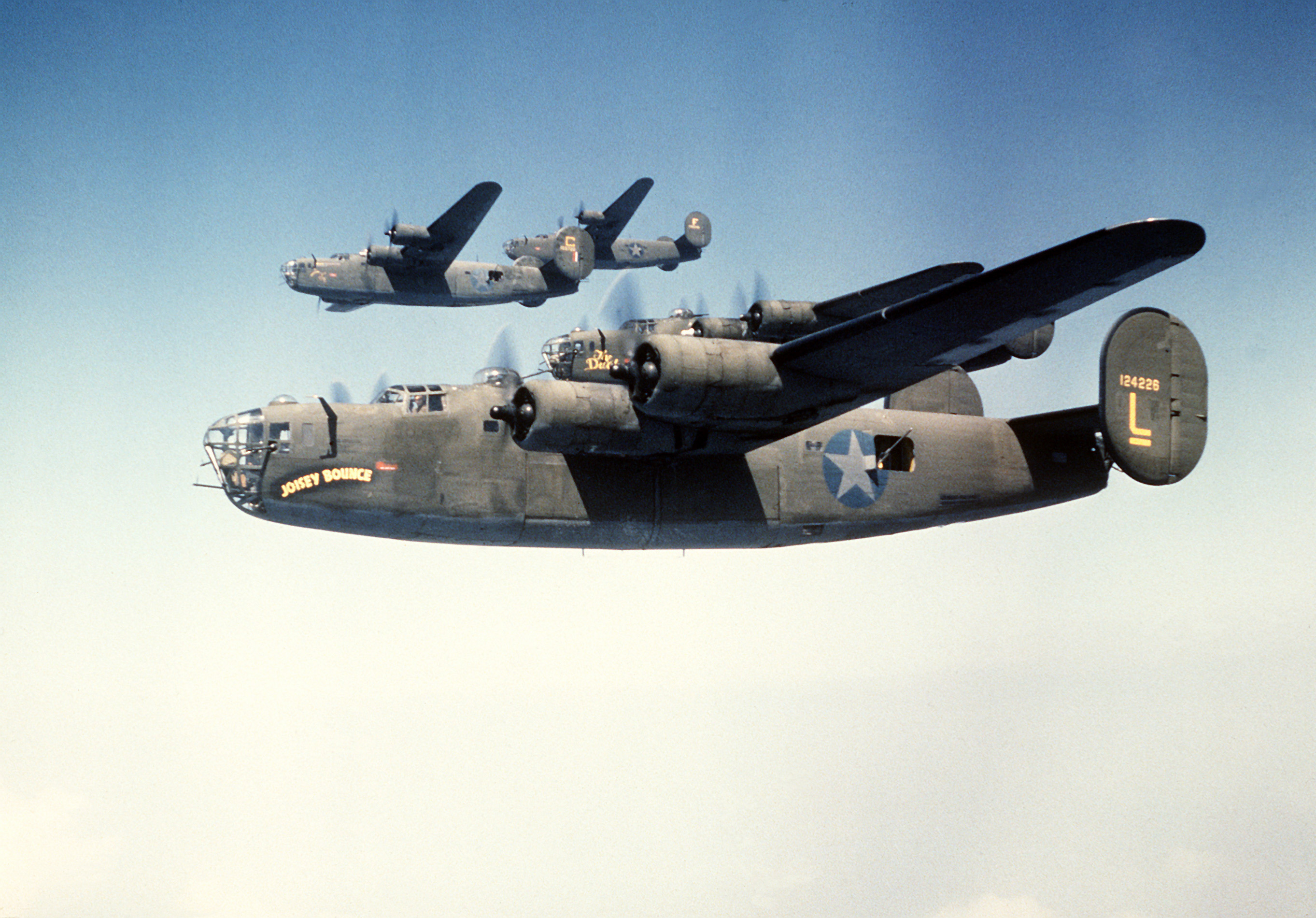
Early B-24D Liberators of the 93d Bombardment Group (Note: The aircraft visible are B-24D-25-CO, serial 41-24226, Joisey Bounce (later Utah Man), collided in midair with B-24D-95-CO 42-40765 on 13 November 1943 on a mission to Bremen, Germany, and crashed near Husum, Germany (Missing Air Crew Report 2179); B-24D-20-CO, serial 41-24147, The Duchess, shot down 25 February 1944 over Herxheim, Germany, (Missing Air Crew Report 2924); B-24D-1-CO, serial 41-23722 "Bomerang"; B-24D-40-CO, serial 42-40246 Thunder Mug, salvaged 10 October 1943. Baugher, Joe (1 April 2023). "1941 USAF Serial Numbers". Joe Baugher. Baugher, Joe (28 December 2022). "1942 USAF Serial Numbers". Joe Baugher.)

==== Training and initial operations ====
The squadron was established as the 19th Reconnaissance Squadron in early 1942 at Barksdale Field, Louisiana as one of the original four squadrons of the 93d Bombardment Group. Since a reorganization of General Headquarters Air Force in September 1936, each bombardment group of the Army Air Forces (AAF) had an attached reconnaissance squadron, which operated the same aircraft as that group's assigned bombardment squadrons. That arrangement continued for units like the 19th that were designated as heavy bombardment units. The squadron was formed from a cadre supplied by the 44th Bombardment Group and was equipped with Consolidated B-24D Liberators. Shortly after activation the 19th was redesignated as the 409th Bombardment Squadron. It completed its Phase I training (Note: Phase I training concentrated on individual training in crewmember specialties. Later phases concentrated on crew coordination and operation as a unit. Greer, p. 606.) at Barksdale. The squadron moved to Page Field, Florida, and flew antisubmarine patrols over the Gulf of Mexico and the Caribbean Sea until the end of July. Its parent group claimed the destruction of three U-boats while stationed in Florida.

Two weeks later the squadron began to deploy to the European Theater of Operations. Its ground echelon sailed aboard the RMS Queen Elizabeth on 31 August, arriving in Scotland on 1 September. The air echelon transferred to Grenier Field, New Hampshire, where it received new B-24Ds. It flew the first formation crossing of the Atlantic in September.

The squadron was a member of the first B-24 heavy bomber group to become part of VIII Bomber Command in England. It flew its first mission on 9 October against a steel factory at Lille. Until December, it operated primarily against submarine pens on the coast of the Bay of Biscay. The squadron flew some antisubmarine patrols with RAF Coastal Command from RAF Holmsley South. Later in the month the 409th transferred some of its personnel to the 329th Bombardment Squadron, which was training for special operations.

==== Deployments to the Mediterranean Theater ====
In early December, the air echelon of the squadron deployed to Algeria, where it was attached to XII Bomber Command. Operating with inadequate supplies under difficult conditions the squadron struck heavy blows against enemy shipping and lines of communication during its Mediterranean deployment. Tafaraoui Airfield had no hardened runways, and the first four missions had to be cancelled when heavy rains turned the airfield into a sea of mud, making it impossible to taxi. After flying one mission, the unit moved to Gambut Main, Libya, where it came under the control of IX Bomber Command. At Gambut, dust storms "played havoc" with the engines of the squadron's B-24s. The 409th flew 22 missions, attacking enemy ports and attacking Italian supply centers to support the British Eighth Army. The squadron was awarded its first Distinguished Unit Citation for these efforts.

The squadron returned to England in February 1943 and until June attacked engine repair facilities, power plants, harbors, and other targets in France, the Low Countries and Germany. In May the squadron was withdrawn from operations and began to train for night attacks. However, this training ended abruptly and the squadrons of the 93d Group joined those of the only other B-24 group in Eighth Air Force, the 44th Bombardment Group, in flying diversionary missions, while Eighth's Boeing B-17 Flying Fortresses attacked primary targets. On 29 May the squadron was once again taken off operations and began practicing low level flights over England. Norden bombsights were removed from unit B-24s and a modified gunsight, optimized for low level attacks, replaced them. Liberators that had been modified for night operations were sent to another unit and bomb bay tanks were installed in others.

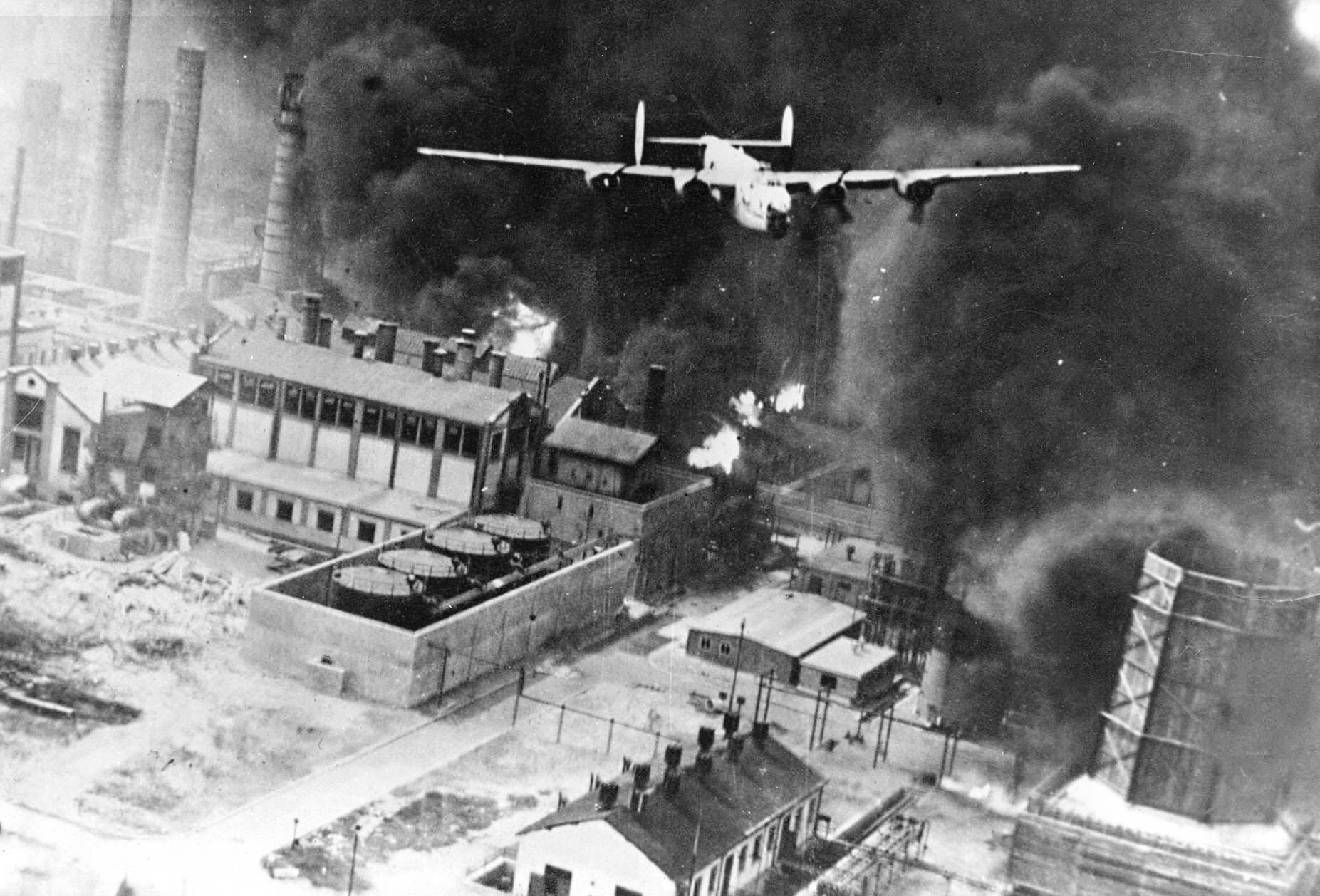
B-24 on target in Operation Tidal Wave

In June, the air echelon returned to Libya and initially supported Operation Husky, the invasion of Sicily, flying ten missions. Following this, the unit resumed low level training in Libya. On 1 August, the squadron participated in Operation Tidal Wave, the low level attack on oil refineries near Ploiești, where 60% of the Axis fuel was produced. This attack involved a round trip of over 2,000 miles. The squadron's formation followed the 376th Bombardment Group which had mistaken the Initial Point for the bomb run and flew the wrong course to the target, bombing targets that had been assigned to other groups, despite heavy opposition from enemy forces that had been fully alerted to the approach of the bombers. For this action, the squadron earned its second Distinguished Unit Citation. Before departing the Mediterranean, the squadron flew an attack against the Messerschmitt Bf 109 factory at Wiener Neustadt, stretching the range of its B-24s and requiring it to recover at bases in Tunisia, which were closer than its station in Libya.

The squadron returned to England in August, but flew only two missions before the air echelon returned to the Mediterranean to fly missions from Tunisia to support the Fifth Army at Salerno during Operation Avalanche, the invasion of Italy. The crews and aircraft returned to England in October.

==== European Theater and post war ====
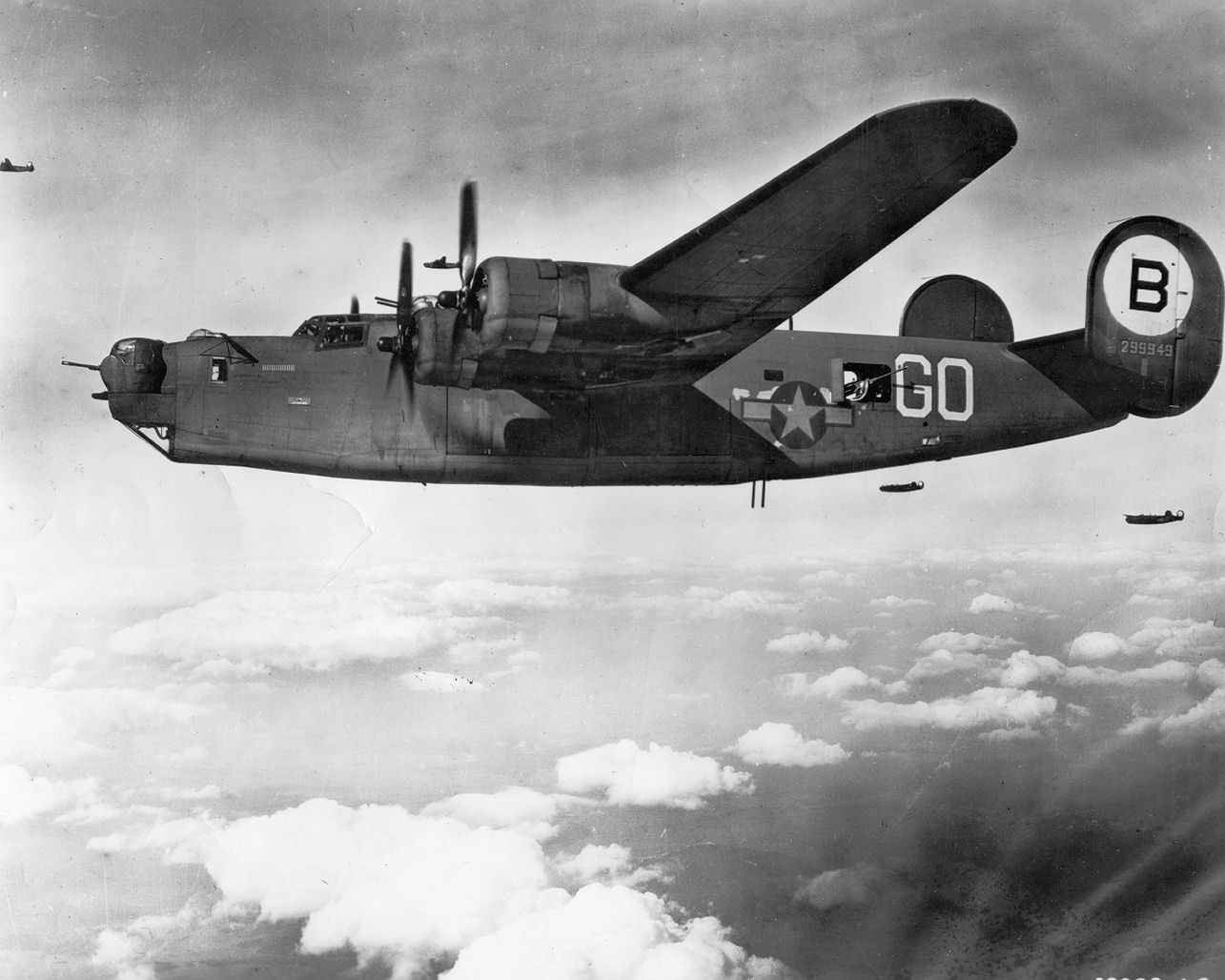
Late model B-24J of the 93d Bomb Group en route to a target in Germany (Note: Consolidated B-24J-55-CO Liberator, serial 42-99949 Naughty Nan is visible in the foreground. Taken on a mission to Friedrichshafen Germany during August 1944. This aircraft was lost over Belgium on 21 September 1944, Missing Air Crew Report 9662.)

From England, the squadron resumed strategic bombardment raids against marshalling yards, aircraft factories, chemical plants, and oil refineries in Germany. The squadron also made tactical attacks on gun emplacements near Cherbourg Naval Base during Operation Overlord, the Normandy invasion, in June 1944 and attacked troop concentrations during the Saint Lo breakout the following month. In August and September, its bombers were diverted to airlifting food, gasoline, water and other supplies to Allies advancing through northern France. It also dropped supplies to airborne troops engaged in Operation Market Garden airborne attacks in the Netherlands.

Near the end of the war, on 24 March 1945, the squadron dropped supplies to airborne forces near Wesel and bombed a night fighter base near Störmede during Operation Varsity, the airborne assault across the Rhine. The squadron ended combat operations in April, and began returning to the United States in May and June. The ground echelon sailed aboard the RMS Queen Mary and received thirty days leave upon arrival. In July the 409th was inactivated when its parent group began conversion to Boeing B-29 Superfortresses.

The squadron was activated again at Pratt Army Air Field, Kansas in August where it began to train with Boeing B-29 Superfortresses. At the end of the year the squadron moved to Clovis Army Air Field, New Mexico. In the spring of 1946 the squadron became one of the first units assigned to the new Strategic Air Command, and in June it moved to Davis-Monthan Field, Arizona, where it was assigned to the 444th Bombardment Group. In October, the 444th group and its squadrons were inactivated and their mission, equipment and personnel were transferred to the 43d Bombardment Group.

=== Air refueling operations ===
The 909th Air Refueling Squadron was organized at Amarillo Air Force Base, Texas in Apr 1963. Once the squadron was combat ready in July, half of the squadron's aircraft were maintained on fifteen-minute alert, fully fueled and ready for combat to reduce vulnerability to a Soviet missile strike. The squadron trained with Boeing KC-135 Stratotankers and conducted worldwide air refueling and participated in Strategic Air Command (SAC) directed exercises. The 909th deployed to refuel tactical units in Southeast Asia as part of Operation Young Tiger and deployed crews and planes to Spain and Alaska for support of Operation Chrome Dome airborne alert forces. The squadron also supported Operation Arc Light B-52 strikes in Southeast Asia.

The 909th maintained combat proficiency at Amarillo until June 1966, when it moved to March Air Force Base, California, where it was assigned to the 22d Bombardment Wing, which became a "super wing" with two bombardment squadrons and two air refueling squadrons assigned. From May to October 1967 the squadron was non-operational as the 22d wing was reduced to a small rear echelon non-combat organization with all its tactical resources allotted to SAC organizations involved in combat in Southeast Asia.

The unit rotated aircrews to Southeast Asia from 1967 to 1973. In 1971 SAC decided to maintain a permanent tanker presence in the Pacific and the squadron moved to Kadena Air Base on Okinawa. The squadron supported the tanker task force at Kadena (Giant Bear) and reconnaissance operations (Rivet Joint and Cobra Ball). In 1991, the squadron was transferred to Pacific Air Forces and reassigned from the 376th Strategic Wing to the 18th Operations Group.

The 909th provided air refueling in Southwest Asia during Operation Desert Storm from August 1990 to March 1991. In 1996 it revisited Southwest Asia to support Operation Desert Strike, an attack against fixed surface-to-air missile sites and air defense sites in Iraq.

=== Expeditionary operations ===
The 909th has been a major force provider for a number of operations in the Pacific area. For these operations, PACAF has activated a provisional 909th Expeditionary Air Refueling Squadron for the operations, using the squadron's resources.

The 909th expeditionary squadron has been:

Assigned to the 613th Air Expeditionary Group from 1 January 2000 to 31 January 2000 at Korat Royal Thai Air Force Base for Cope Tiger
Assigned to the 13th Air Expeditionary Group from 5 February 2004 to 9 March 2004 at Korat Royal Thai Air Force Base for Cope Tiger 04
Assigned to the 605th Air Expeditionary Group from 30 October 2004 to 30 November 2004 at Yokota Air Base for Keen Sword 05
Assigned to the 3d Air Expeditionary Group from 2 October 2005 to 24 October 2005 at Eielson Air Force Base for Cope Thunder 06-1
Assigned to the 5th Air Expeditionary Group from 31 October 2005 to 24 November 2005 at Yokota Air Base for Cope North 06-1
Assigned to the 13th Air Expeditionary Group from 14 January 2008 to 13 February 2008 at Korat Royal Thai Air Force Base for Cope Tiger 08
Attached to Thirteenth Air Force from 21 November 2008 to 9 December 2008 at RAAF Base Darwin for Aces North 09
Assigned to the 13th Air Expeditionary Wing from c. March 2009 to 3 April 2009 at Korat Royal Thai Air Force Base for Cope Tiger 09
Assigned to the 18th Air Expeditionary Wing from 6 July 2009 to 26 July 2009 at RAAF Base Darwin for Talisman Saber 09

== Lineage ==
409th Bombardment Squadron

- Constituted as the 19th Reconnaissance Squadron (Heavy) on 28 January 1942

Activated on 1 March 1942
Redesignated 409th Bombardment Squadron (Heavy) on 22 April 1942
Redesignated 409th Bombardment Squadron, Heavy on 6 March 1944
Inactivated on 6 July 1945

- Redesignated 409th Bombardment Squadron, Very Heavy on 5 August 1945

Activated on 20 August 1945
Inactivated on 1 October 1946

- Consolidated on 19 September 1985 with the 909th Air Refueling Squadron as the 909th Air Refueling Squadron

909th Air Refueling Squadron

- Constituted as the 909th Air Refueling Squadron, Heavy on 18 January 1963 and activated (not organized)

Organized on 1 April 1963

- Consolidated on 19 September 1985 with the 409th Bombardment Squadron

Redesignated 909th Air Refueling Squadron on 1 October 1991

=== Assignments ===
- 93d Bombardment Group, 1 March 1942 – 6 July 1945
- 93d Bombardment Group, 20 August 1945
- 444th Bombardment Group, 6 May 1946 – 1 October 1946
- Strategic Air Command, 18 January 1963 (not organized)
- 461st Bombardment Wing, 1 April 1963
- 22d Bombardment Wing, 25 June 1966
- 376th Strategic Wing, 1 July 1971
- 18th Operations Group, 1 October 1991 – Present

=== Stations ===
- Barksdale Field, Louisiana, 1 March 1942
- Page Field, Florida, 18 May 1942 – 13 August 1942
- RAF Alconbury (AAF-102), England, 7 September 1942
- RAF Hardwick (AAF-104), England, c. 6 December 1942 – 15 June 1945

Air echelon operated from:

Tafaraoui Airfield, Algeria, 7 December 1942
RAF Gambut Main (LG139), Libya, 16 December 1942 – 25 February 1943
Bengazi Airfield, Libya, 27 June 1943 – 25 August 1943
Oudna Airfield, Tunisia, 18 September 1943 – 3 October 1943

- Sioux Falls Army Air Field, South Dakota, 26 June 1945 – 26 July 1945
- Pratt Army Air Field, Kansas, 20 August 1945
- Clovis Army Air Field, New Mexico, 13 December 1945
- Davis-Monthan Field, Arizona, 18 June 1945 – 1 October 1946
- Amarillo Air Force Base, Texas, 1 April 1963
- March Air Force Base, California, 25 June 1966
- Kadena Air Base, Japan, 1 July 1971 – Present

=== Aircraft ===
- Consolidated B-24 Liberator (1942–1945)
- Boeing B-29 Superfortress (1945–1946)
- Boeing KC-135 Stratotanker (1963 – present)

=== Awards and campaigns ===
Award streamer	Award	Dates	Notes
	Distinguished Unit Citation	17 Dec 1942-20 Feb 1943 North Africa	409th Bombardment Squadron
	Distinguished Unit Citation	1 August 1943 Ploiești, Romania	409th Bombardment Squadron
	Air Force Outstanding Unit Award w/Combat "V" Device	1 July 1971 – 31 March 1972	909th Air Refueling Squadron
	Air Force Outstanding Unit Award w/Combat "V" Device	1 April 1972 – 28 January 1973	909th Air Refueling Squadron
	Air Force Outstanding Unit Award	1 April 1967 – 1 October 1967	909th Air Refueling Squadron
	Air Force Outstanding Unit Award	25 March 1968 – 1 May 1968	909th Air Refueling Squadron
	Air Force Outstanding Unit Award	1 July 1969 – 30 June 1970	909th Air Refueling Squadron
	Air Force Outstanding Unit Award	1 September 1970 – 30 June 1971	909th Air Refueling Squadron
	Air Force Outstanding Unit Award	29 January 1973 – 31 March 1974	909th Air Refueling Squadron
	Air Force Outstanding Unit Award	1 July 1974 – 30 June 1976	909th Air Refueling Squadron
	Air Force Outstanding Unit Award	1 July 1976 – 30 June 1977	909th Air Refueling Squadron
	Air Force Outstanding Unit Award	1 July 1977 – 30 June 1979	909th Air Refueling Squadron
	Air Force Outstanding Unit Award	1 July 1981 – 30 June 1983	909th Air Refueling Squadron
	Air Force Outstanding Unit Award	1 July 1985 – 30 June 1987	909th Air Refueling Squadron
	Air Force Outstanding Unit Award	1 July 1987 – 30 June 1988	909th Air Refueling Squadron
	Air Force Outstanding Unit Award	1 July 1989 – 30 June 1991	909th Air Refueling Squadron
	Air Force Outstanding Unit Award	1 June 1991 – 31 May 1993	909th Air Refueling Squadron
	Air Force Outstanding Unit Award	1 June 1993 – 31 August 1994	909th Air Refueling Squadron
	Air Force Outstanding Unit Award	1 September 1995 – 31 August 1997	909th Air Refueling Squadron
	Air Force Outstanding Unit Award	1 October 1998 – 30 September 2000	909th Air Refueling Squadron
	Air Force Outstanding Unit Award	1 October 2000 – 30 September 2002	909th Air Refueling Squadron
	Air Force Outstanding Unit Award	1 October 2002 – 30 September 2004	909th Air Refueling Squadron
	Air Force Outstanding Unit Award	1 October 2005 – 30 September 2007	909th Air Refueling Squadron
	Vietnamese Gallantry Cross with Palm	1 July 1971 – 28 January 1973	909th Air Refueling Squadron

Campaign Streamer	Campaign	Dates	Notes
	Antisubmarine	1 March 1942 – 13 August 1942	409th Bombardment Squadron
	Egypt-Libya	16 December 1942 – 12 February 1943	409th Bombardment Squadron
	Air Offensive, Europe	7 September 1942 – 5 June 1944	409th Bombardment Squadron
	Tunisia	12 November 1942 – 13 May 1943	409th Bombardment Squadron
	Sicily	14 May 1943 – 17 August 1943	409th Bombardment Squadron
	Naples-Foggia	18 August 1943 – 21 January 1944	409th Bombardment Squadron
	Normandy	6 June 1944 – 24 July 1944	409th Bombardment Squadron
	Northern France	25 July 1944 – 14 September 1944	409th Bombardment Squadron
	Rhineland	15 September 1944 – 21 March 1945	409th Bombardment Squadron
	Ardennes-Alsace	16 December 1944 – 25 January 1945	409th Bombardment Squadron
	Central Europe	22 March 1944 – 21 May 1945	409th Bombardment Squadron
	Air Combat, EAME Theater	7 September 1942 – 11 May 1945	409th Bombardment Squadron
	Defense of Saudi Arabia	2 August 1990 – 16 January 1991	909th Air Refueling Squadron
	Liberation and Defense of Kuwait	17 January 1991 – 11 April 1991	909th Air Refueling Squadron

== See also ==
- List of United States Air Force air refueling squadrons
- B-24 Liberator units of the United States Army Air Forces
