= 679th Bombardment Squadron =

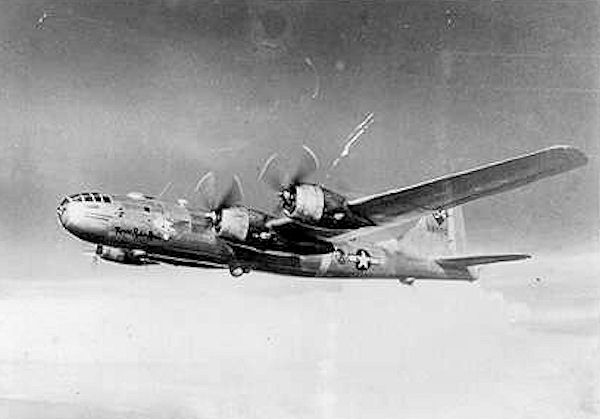
- 444th Bombardment Group B-29 Superfortress (Note: Aircraft is Bell Aircraft built Boeing B-29-30-BA Superfortress, serial 42-63577 Round Robin Rosie. This aircraft returned to the United States after the war and was reclaimed on 15 February 1957. Bauger, "1942 USAF Serial Numbers".)
- Active: 1943-1944
- Country: United States
- Branch: United States Air Force
- Role: Heavy bomber
- Engagements: American Theater of World War II; China Burma India Theater
- Decorations: Distinguished Unit Citation

Insignia
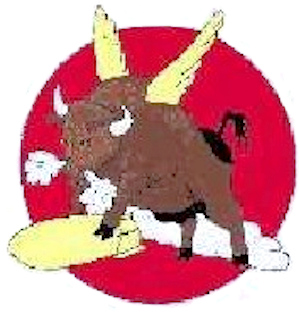
- Unofficial 679th Bombardment Squadron emblem

The 679th Bombardment Squadron is a disbanded unit of the United States Army Air Forces (AAF). It was last assigned to the 444th Bombardment Group at Dudhkundi Airfield, India where it was disbanded on 12 October 1944.

During World War II, the squadron was an Army Air Forces combat organization. It was part of the first Boeing B-29 Superfortress group formed for the 58th Bombardment Wing, and served in the China Burma India Theater as part of Twentieth Air Force. The squadron's aircraft engaged in very heavy bombardment operations against Japan. The squadron received the Distinguished Unit Citation for its combat operations. It was disbanded when the AAF reorganized its very heavy bombardment groups into three squadron units.

== History ==
=== Training for combat ===
The 679th Bombardment Squadron was activated on 1 March 1943 at Davis-Monthan Field, Arizona as one of the original squadrons of the 444th Bombardment Group. The 444th was assigned to the first Boeing B-29 Superfortress wing, the 58th Bombardment Wing. After a period of organization at Davis-Monthan the squadron moved to Great Bend Army Air Field, Kansas. for training, initially flying Boeing B-17 Flying Fortresses, Consolidated B-24 Liberators and Martin B-26 Marauders. The group engaged in training on the new aircraft and its mission of long range precision bombing. At Great Bend, the squadron received early model Boeing B-29 Superfortresses and prototype YB-29s, however aircraft were still undergoing development and were frequently modified by Boeing technicians in the field while the squadron was undergoing training in Kansas. In November 1943 The 444th reorganized as a Very Heavy group and added the 8th Bombardment Maintenance Squadron, which was paired with the 679th to maintain its B-29s.

=== China Burma India Theater ===
In early April 1944, the squadron left the United States and deployed to a former B-24 Liberator airfield at Charra Airfield, India. The first airplane of the 444th group landed at Charra on 11 April 1944. Due to the lack of revetments at Charra the squadron's airplanes were parked wingtip to wingtip on the field's shorter runway. Charra served only as a maintenance and staging base. Its runways were too short for a B-29 to take off fully loaded. While the group was stationed there, all missions were flown from the bases of the other groups in the 58th Bombardment Wing.

From India, the 444th Bomb Group planned to fly missions against Japan from advanced airfields in China. However, all the supplies of fuel, bombs and spare parts needed to support operations from the forward bases in China had to be flown from India over The Hump. For this role, one aircraft from the squadron was stripped of combat equipment and used as a flying tanker. Each aircraft carried seven tons of fuel, but the amount that was delivered to China depended on weather, including headwinds and aircraft icing which increased the fuel consumption of the "tankers."

The squadron flew its first combat mission on 5 June 1944 against the Makasan railroad yards at Bangkok, Thailand. Ten days later the 679th participated in the first American air attack on the Japanese home islands since the 1942 Doolittle Raid, staging through Chinese bases on a nighttime raid against the iron and steel works at Yawata, Japan. It returned to Yawata on 20 August on a daytime raid for which the unit was awarded the Distinguished Unit Citation. Operating from bases in India and at times staging through fields in China, the group struck transportation centers, naval installations, aircraft plants and other targets in Burma, China, Thailand, Japan and Formosa.

On 12 October 1944 the 444th group reorganized. The 679th Bombardment Squadron and the four bombardment maintenance squadrons were disbanded and their personnel and equipment were transferred to the other squadrons of the group.

== Lineage ==
- Constituted as the 679th Bombardment Squadron (Heavy) on 15 February 1943

Activated on 1 March 1943
Redesignated 679th Bombardment Squadron (Heavy) (B-29) on 26 April 1943
Redesignated 679th Bombardment Squadron, Very Heavy on 20 November 1943
Disbanded on 12 October 1944

=== Assignments ===
- 444th Bombardment Group, 1 March 1943 – 12 October 1944

=== Stations ===
- Davis-Monthan Field, Arizona, 1 March 1943
- Great Bend Army Air Field, Kansas, 3 August 1943 – 12 March 1944
- Charra Airfield, India, c. 13 April 1944
- Dudhkundi Airfield, India, 1 July 1844 – 12 October 1944

=== Aircraft ===
- Consolidated B-24 Liberator, 1943
- Boeing B-17 Flying Fortress, 1943–1944
- Boeing YB-29 Superfortress, 1943–1944
- Boeing B-29 Superfortress, 1943–1944

== Awards and campaigns ==
Award streamer	Award	Dates	Notes
	Distinguished Unit Citation	20 August 1944	Yawata, Japan

Campaign Streamer	Campaign	Dates	Notes
	American Theater of World War II without inscription	1 March 1943 – 12 March 1944	
	India-Burma	13 April 1944 – 12 October 1944	
	Air Offensive, Japan	13 April 1944 – 12 October 1944	
	China Defensive	13 April 1944 – 12 October 1944	

== See also ==
- List of B-29 Superfortress operators
