= 444th Air Expeditionary Wing =

Provisional unit of United States Air Force

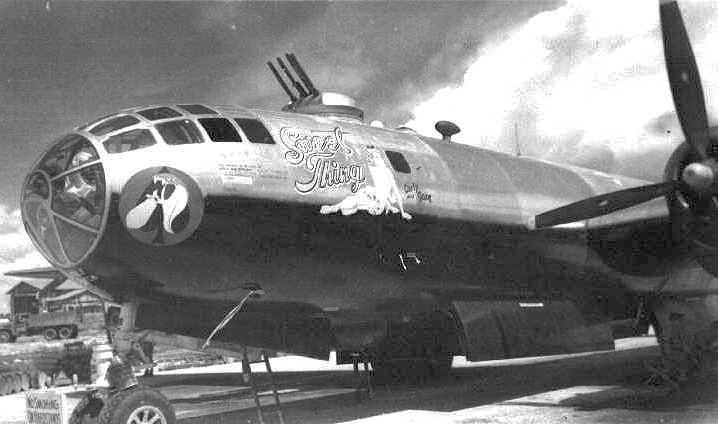
- Boeing B-29 Superfortress 44-70108 Sweet Thing of the 444th Bombardment Group (Note: Sweet Thing set a speed record from Hawaii to California on her return to the United States.)
- Active: 1943–1946; 2003
- Country: United States
- Branch: United States Air Force
- Role: Bombardment
- Motto: Per Victoriam Ad Libertatem (Latin for 'Liberty Through Victory')
- Engagements: China Burma India Theater Pacific Theater of Operations
- Decorations: Distinguished Unit Citation; Air Force Outstanding Unit Award with Combat "V" device

Insignia
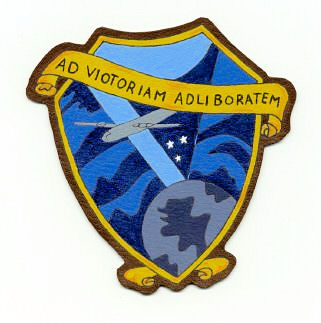
- 444th Bombardment Group Insignia
- Tail Marking (1945): Triangle N

The 444th Air Expeditionary Wing is a provisional unit of the United States Air Force assigned to Air Combat Command to activate or inactivate as needed. It was last activated in 2003.

During World War II, the 444th Bombardment Group was a United States Army Air Forces combat organization. The group was the first Boeing B-29 Superfortress Group formed for the 58th Bombardment Wing, and served in the China Burma India Theater and Central Pacific Area as part of the Twentieth Air Force. The group's aircraft engaged in very heavy bombardment operations against Japan. The group received the Distinguished Unit Citation for its combat operations on three occasions.

After returning to the United States, the 444th Bombardment Group became one of the original ten bombardment groups assigned to Strategic Air Command (SAC). The unit was inactivated on 1 October 1946 at Davis–Monthan Field, Arizona. Its B-29 aircraft and personnel were reassigned to the 43d Bombardment Group.

During Operation Iraqi Freedom the group was briefly activated as the 444th Air Expeditionary Group. The composition and stationing of the unit was never officially disclosed, and it was inactivated after the invasion of Iraq was completed.

== History ==
=== Training for combat ===
The 444th Bombardment Group was activated on 1 March 1943 at Davis–Monthan Field, Arizona. Its original squadrons were the 676th, 677th, 678th, and 679th Bombardment Squadrons. After a period of organization at Davis–Monthan the group moved to Great Bend AAF, Kansas. for training, initially flying Boeing B-17 Flying Fortresses, Consolidated B-24 Liberators and Martin B-26 Marauders. After receiving its B-29s, the aircraft were ferried off to modification centers to correct design flaws. The 444th, under the command of Colonel Alva Harvey, was assigned to the first B-29 Superfortress wing, the 58th Bombardment Wing. After the planes were returned, the group engaged in training on the new aircraft and its mission of long range precision bombing. In November 1943 the 444th reorganized as a "Very Heavy" group and added four Bombardment Maintenance Squadrons and a Photographic Laboratory.

=== China Burma India Theater ===
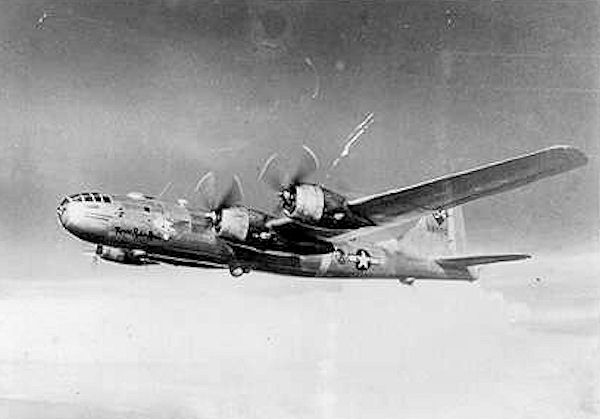
677th Bomb Squadron 42-63577 "Round Robin Rosie" Showing tail number in diamond used in CBI

In early April 1944, the group left the United States and deployed to a former B-24 Liberator airfield at Charra Airfield, India. The first airplane of the group landed at Charra on 11 April 1944. Due to the lack of revetments at Charra the group's airplanes were parked wingtip to wingtip on the field's shorter runway. Charra served only as a maintenance and staging base. Its runways were too short for a B-29 to take off fully loaded. While the group was stationed there, all missions were flown from the bases of the other groups in the 58th Bombardment Wing.

During the week of 15–22 April, no fewer than five 58th wing B-29s crashed near Karachi, all from overheated engines. The cause was traced to the design of the engine cowl flaps which controlled air flow over the cylinders. There were also problems with exhaust valves and valve guides on the engine. The B-29 was an advanced aeronautical design which had not been fully tested before being deployed overseas. The Wright 3350 tended to overheat partially due to reduced airflow over the rear cylinders due to restricted space caused by the cowl flap design. Additional complications leading to overheating were caused by operations in the tropical heat of India and by flying with maximum loads. The lower air pressures produced by the high ambient heat reduced lift and engine performance. The result was engine fires and crashes on take off.

From India, the 444th Bomb Group planned to fly missions against Japan from advanced airfields in China. However, all the supplies of fuel, bombs and spare parts needed to support operations from the forward bases in China had to be flown in from India over "The Hump" (the name given by Allied pilots to the eastern end of the Himalayan Mountains), since Japanese control of eastern China and the Chinese coast made seaborne supply of China impossible. Also, the forward bases were located in Szechaun Province in south central China far from the coast, with no roads or railroads into the area from Allied-controlled territory. Supplies had to be delivered to China by the B-29s themselves or by the C-47s and C-46s of Air Transport Command. For this role, one aircraft from each squadron was stripped of combat equipment and used as a flying tanker. Each aircraft carried seven tons of fuel, but the amount that was delivered to China depended on weather, including headwinds and aircraft icing which increased the fuel consumption of the "tankers." The Hump route was so dangerous and difficult that each time a B-29 flew from India to China it was counted as a mission. The 677th squadron described a typical 'Hump" mission, telling of the "thousands of Chinese coolies on the runway, their friendliness and curiosity, the rather exciting way they have of running across the runway in front of the landing planes (thinking they are evil spirits which are right behind them), and the good living at the advanced base".

The group flew its first combat mission on 5 June 1944 against the Makasan railroad yards at Bangkok, Thailand. Ten days later the group participated in the first American air attack on the Japanese home islands since the 1942 Doolittle Raid, staging through Chinese bases on a nighttime raid against the iron and steel works at Yawata, Japan. It returned to Yawata on 20 August on a daytime raid for which the group was awarded the Distinguished Unit Citation. However, the 444th lost fourteen B-29s by this time (just six in combat). Operating from bases in India and at times staging through fields in China, the group struck transportation centers, naval installations, aircraft plants and other targets in Burma, China, Thailand, Japan and Formosa.

The 444th Bomb Group carried out the longest bombing mission of World War II. Staging out of their Indian bases they struck the Japanese naval base at Singapore blowing the door off the King George V floating drydock from 30,000 feet. This bombing accuracy contradicted reports of inaccuracy of B-29 bombing. The mission was nearly 4,100 miles round trip. (Note: The 444th set progressive records for long missions, starting with their mission to Yawata (3182 miles) and a mission to Palembang, Sumatra on 10 August 1944 (3603 miles). Pictorial History. p. 88. The reference does not state whether these distances were measured in statute or nautical miles.)

On 12 October 1944 the group reorganized. The 679th Bombardment Squadron and the four bombardment maintenance squadrons were inactivated and their personnel and equipment were transferred to the other squadrons of the group. As the new year started, Japanese advances forced withdrawal from the Chinese forward operating bases. Unable to continue attacks on Japan, the group continued attacking targets in Southeast Asia.

=== Pacific Theater ===
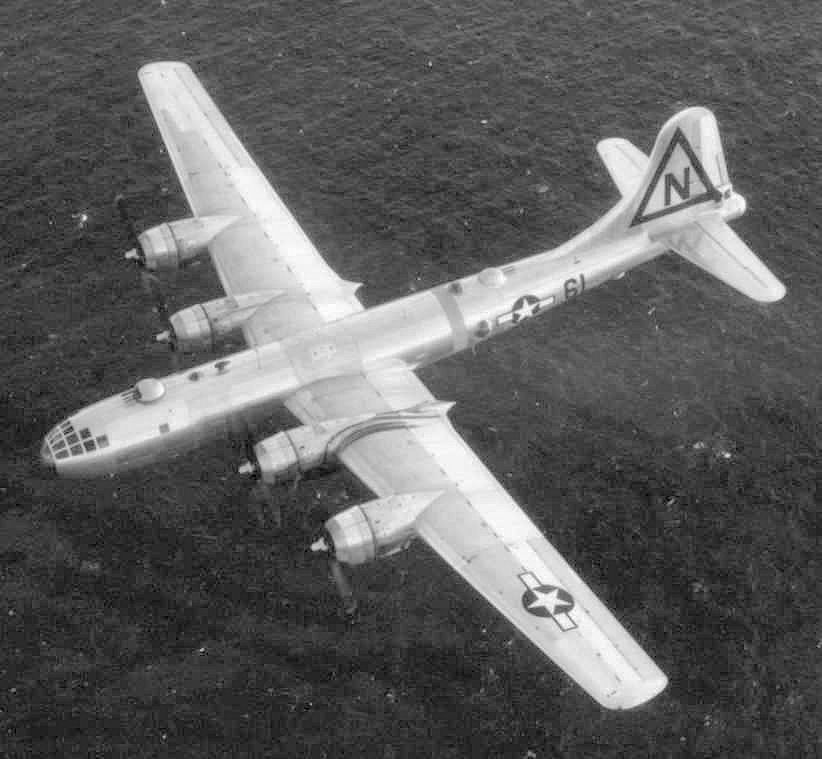
677th Bomb Squadron 42-63411 "Dutchess" showing Triangle N tail marking used on Tinian

In the spring of 1945 the 444th and the other groups of the 58th Bomb Wing moved to Tinian in the Marianas in order to continue operations against Japan. The 444th arrived in April and entered combat on May 10, to the Oshima oil tanks. It participated in the bombing of strategic objectives and in incendiary on urban areas for the duration of the war. It received a second Distinguished Unit Citation for attacking oil storage facilities at Oshima, bombing an aircraft plant near Kobe, and dropping incendiaries on Nagoya in May 1945. The wing struck light metal industries at Osaka in July 1945, receiving a third Distinguished Unit Citation for this action. The group's final mission was flown against an IJN arsenal in Hikari, Japan on 14 August 1945, the day before the Japanese surrender. By this time the group had lost 51 B-29s (38 in the CBI and 13 flying from Tinian). After the war the planes and crews flew back to the states via Kwajalein and Hawaii.

=== Strategic Air Command ===
The 444th returned to the United States and Merced Army Air Field, California in November 1945 where it was assigned to Fourth Air Force of Continental Air Forces (CAF). The 344th Bombardment Squadron moved to Merced and was assigned to the group. Shortly after arriving at Merced, the 678th Bombardment Squadron converted to the reconnaissance mission and became the 10th Reconnaissance Squadron, Very Long Range (Photographic). March 1946 saw more changes as the 344th was inactivated and the 10th squadron was reassigned to the 311th Reconnaissance Wing, which inactivated it at the end of the month. CAF became Strategic Air Command (SAC)and the 444th was one of the ten original bombardment groups assigned to SAC.

In May the group moved back to Davis–Monthan Field, where it was integrated with the host 248th AAF Base Unit. The 409th Bombardment Squadron, which was at Clovis Army Air Field, New Mexico converting to B-29s was assigned to the group when the group moved. The following month the 409th joined the group and its other two squadrons at Davis–Monthan. The group was inactivated on 1 October 1946 and its personnel and aircraft were reassigned to the 43d Bombardment Group, which was activated at Davis–Monthan on 1 October 1946 as part of the re-established Eighth Air Force.

=== Expeditionary unit ===
In 2003 the group was converted to provisional status and redesignated the 444th Air Expeditionary Group. It was active during 2003 and received an Air Force Outstanding Unit Award with combat "V" for its performance.

== Lineage ==
- Constituted as the 444th Bombardment Group (Heavy) on 15 February 1943

Activated on 1 March 1943
Redesignated 444th Bombardment Group (Heavy) (B-29) on 26 April 1943
Redesignated 444th Bombardment Group, Very Heavy on 20 November 1943
Inactivated on 4 August 1946

- Converted to provisional status and redesignated 444th Air Expeditionary Group on 15 January 2003

Activated by 24 January 2003
Inactivated on or after 15 October 2003

- Redesignated 444th Air Expeditionary Wing on 24 February 2010

=== Assignments ===
- Second Air Force: 1 March 1943
- 58th Bombardment Wing: 23 July 1943
- Second Air Force: 5 November 1943
- 58th Bombardment Wing: 20 November 1943
- XX Bomber Command: 12 October 1944
- 58th Bombardment Wing: 3 April 1945
- I Staging Command: 10 November 1945
- Fourth Air Force: c. 15 November 1945
- 58th Bombardment Wing: 14 January 1946 – 1 October 1946
- Air Combat Command to activate or inactivate any time after 15 January 2003

=== Components ===
- 344th Bombardment Squadron, 10 November 1945 – 27 March 1946
- 409th Bombardment Squadron, 6 May 1946 – 1 October 1946

located at Clovis Army Air Field, New Mexico until 18 June 1946

- 676th Bombardment Squadron, 1 March 1943 – 1 October 1946
- 677th Bombardment Squadron, 1 March 1943 – 1 October 1946
- 678th Bombardment Squadron (later 10th Reconnaissance Squadron), 1 March 1943 – 7 March 1946
- 679th Bombardment Squadron, 1 March 1943 – 12 October 1944
- 5th Bombardment Maintenance Squadron, 20 November 1943 – 12 October 1944
- 6th Bombardment Maintenance Squadron, 20 November 1943 – 12 October 1944
- 7th Bombardment Maintenance Squadron, 20 November 1943 – 12 October 1944
- 8th Bombardment Maintenance Squadron, 20 November 1943 – 12 October 1944
- 23d Bombardment Maintenance Squadron, 10 December 1943 – 1 January 1944
- 12th Photographic Laboratory Squadron, 20 November 1943 – ca. 31 March 1946

=== Stations ===
- Davis–Monthan Field, Arizona, 1 March – 22 July 1943
- Great Bend Army Air Field, Kansas 29 July 1943 – 12 March 1944
- Charra Airfield, India 11 April – 1 July 1944
- Dudhkundi Airfield, India 1 July 1944 – 1 March 1945

Kwanghan Airfield (A-3), China designated as forward staging base.

- West Field, Tinian, Mariana Islands 7 April – 18 September 1945
- Merced Army Air Field (later Castle Field), California 15 November 1945
- Davis–Monthan Field, Arizona, 6 May 1946 – 1 October 1946
- Forward location, 24 January 2003 – 15 October 2003

=== Aircraft ===
- Boeing B-17 Flying Fortress
- Consolidated B-24 Liberator
- Boeing B-29 Superfortress

== Awards and campaigns ==
Award streamer	Award	Dates	Notes
	Distinguished Unit Citation	20 August 1944	444th Bombardment Group Yawata, Japan
	Distinguished Unit Citation	10 to 14 May 1945	444th Bombardment Group Japan
	Distinguished Unit Citation	24 July 1945	444th Bombardment Group Osaka, Japan
	Air Force Outstanding Unit Award w/Combat "V" Device	24 January 2003 – 15 October 2003	444th Air Expeditionary Group

Campaign Streamer	Campaign	Dates	Notes
	American Theater of World War II		
	India-Burma		
	Central Burma		
	Air Offensive, Japan		
	China Defensive		
	Western Pacific		
