= Guanghan Airport =

Guanghan Airport Kwanghan Airfield 广汉机场
- IATA: GHN; ICAO: ZUGH

Summary
- Airport type: Pilot training
- Operator: Civil Aviation Flight University of China
- Location: Guanghan, Sichuan, China
- Built: 1942
- Coordinates: 30°56′52″N 104°19′47″E

Map
- Location of airport in Sichuan

Guanghan Airport (Chinese: 广汉机场) (IATA: GHN, ICAO: ZUGH) is an airport southeast of Guanghan, Sichuan, China. Formerly a military airfield known as Kwanghan Airfield (A-3) during World War II. It is now used by Civil Aviation Flight University of China for pilot training and has no commercial flights.

== History ==
During World War II, the airfield was the forward staging base for the 444th Bombardment Group, which carried out B-29 Superfortress raids on the Japanese Home Islands.

In 1943, The United States Army Air Force was given rights to use the airfield to stage bombing missions from India to attack Japan. It was one of four B-29 bases established by the Americans in China.

The USAAF 444th Bombardment Group (Very Heavy) flew missions from the airfield beginning in mid-June 1944. The group had to transport its supplies of fuel, bombs, and spare parts from its base at Dudhkundi, India over "The Hump" (the name given by Allied pilots to the eastern end of the Himalayan Mountains), since Japanese control of the seas around the Chinese coast made seaborne supply of China impossible. The first mission was carried out on the night of June 14/15, 1944 against the Imperial Iron and Steel Works at Yawata on Kyushu. This plant was considered to be the most important single objective within Japan's steel industry, and had long held top priority for the first strike. It was the first time since the Doolittle Raid of 1942 that American aircraft had bombed the Japanese home islands.

In addition to the bombers, the USAAF 81st Fighter Group used the airfield, flying P-40 Warhawk and P-47 Thunderbolt fighters as part of the Fourteenth Air Force "Flying Tigers". The 81st provided close air support for Chinese Army ground forces fighting the Japanese, as well as flying escort missions for the B-29s over the Japanese-occupied area of China. In January 1945 the B-29 bombers were moved back to India before transferring in April to the newly captured bases in the Mariana Islands. In February, the fighters were moved to a new airfield near Fungwansham. With the departure of the Americans, the much-improved airfield was then returned to Chinese authorities.

== See also ==
- Operation Matterhorn
