= Chharra Airfield =

Abandoned airfield in India

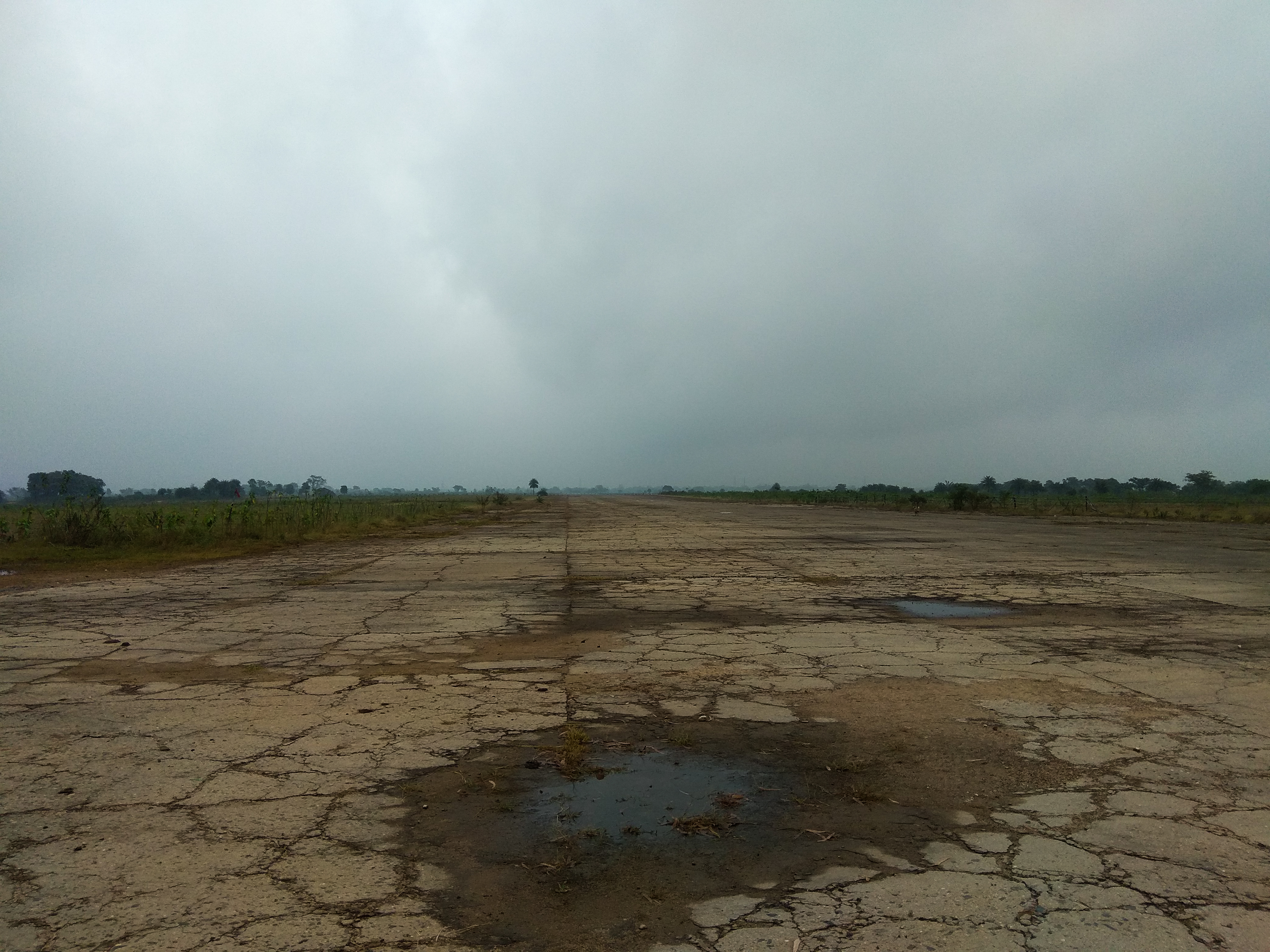
- IATA: none; ICAO: none

Summary
- Airport type: Public
- Serves: Purulia
- Location: Chharra, Purulia, West Bengal, India
- Built: 1942; 84 years ago
- Coordinates: 23°21′56.95″N 086°26′12.84″E

Map
- Location of airport in West Bengal Chharra Airfield (India)

Runways
Direction	Length		Surface
Direction	ft	m	Surface
01/19	4,593	1,400	Concrete (Abandoned)
10/28	6,900	2,100	Concrete (Abandoned)

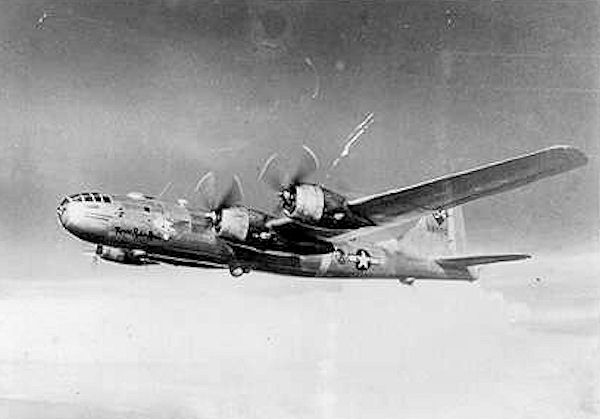
The 677th Bomb Squadron 42-63577, named "Round Robin Rosie"

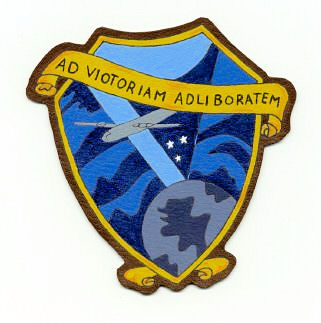
Emblem of the 444th Bombardment Squadron

Chharra Airfield (IATA: none, ICAO: none) is an abandoned military airfield in Purulia, West Bengal, India, which was built in 1942 and was used until 1945, used during World War II. It was a part of the Twentieth Air Force and the Tenth Air Force of the Royal Indian Air Force (RIAF), and was the bases of 677th Bomb Squadron, or what was called as the "Round Robin Rosie", and the 444th Bombardment Squadron, both of RIAF. It is located 8 km (5.0 mi) north-east from the city centre.

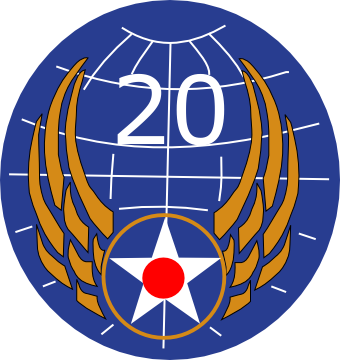
Emblem of the Twentieth Air Force

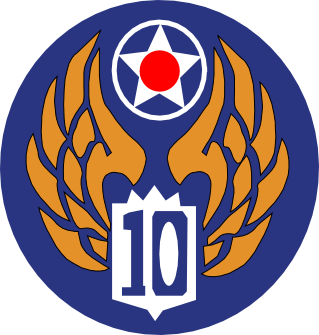
Emblem of the Tenth Air Force

To support and facilitate development along with connectivity, employment and tourism in the region, the airstrip is being constructed into a commercial airport, consisting of a passenger terminal, a runway with taxiways connecting to it, a helipad, a passenger terminal, a flying club, an Air Traffic Control (ATC) tower among other ancillary facilities like a fire station, a cargo handling area etc. It is being built at a cost of around ₹ 300 crore and is expected to be completed by mid-2025.

== History ==
During World War II, the airfield hosted the United States Army Air Force 444th Bombardment Group. Chharra was originally designed for B-24 Liberator use. In 1943, it was designated as a B-29 Superfortress Base for the planned deployment of the United States Army Air Forces XX Bomber Command to India. Advanced Army Air Forces echelons arrived in India in December 1943 to organize the upgrading of the airfield, and thousands of Indians labored to upgrade the facility for Superfortress operations.

On 11 April 1944, the 444th arrived after a month-long deployment over the South Atlantic transport route after completing training at Great Bend AAF, Kansas. The deployment consisted of traveling to Morrison Field, Florida, then south through the Caribbean to Natal, Brazil. From Brazil, the South Atlantic was crossed arriving in West Africa and re-assembling at Marrakesh, Morocco. The group then flew north and west from Morocco through Algeria and Egypt, before arriving at Karachi. By the time the group arrived at Chharra, the month-long trip had taken its toll on the aircraft and personnel. Support elements of the group included the 5th, 6th, 7th and 8th Bomb Maintenance Squadrons; the 12th Photo Lab, and the 25th Air Service Group.

Almost immediately upon arrival, the groups B-29s were grounded due to engine fires, which were caused by the engines not being designed to operate at ground temperatures higher than 115 °F (46 °C), which were typically exceeded in India. Modifications had to be made to the engines and also to the cowl flaps. After these modifications, B-29 flights were resumed.

From India, the 444th Bomb Group planned to fly missions against Japan from airfields in China. Kwanghan Airfield (A-3), located just to the southwest of Chengdu in south-central China, was designated as the forward staging base for the group.

However, all the supplies of fuel, bombs, and spares needed to support operations from Kwanghan had to be flown 1,200 mi (1,900 km) from India over "The Hump" (the name given by Allied pilots to the eastern end of the Himalayan Mountains), since Japanese control of the seas around the Chinese coast made seaborne supply of China impossible. Many of the supplies had to be delivered to China by the B-29s themselves. For this role, they were stripped of nearly all combat equipment and used as flying tankers and each carried seven tons of fuel for the six-hour (one-way) flight, which itself was almost at the limit of the B-29's range. The Hump route was so dangerous and difficult, that each time a B-29 flew from India to China it was counted as a combat mission. It took six round-trip flights by each Superfortress to Kwanghan in order to mount one combat mission from the forward base.

The first combat mission by the group finally took place on 5 June, when squadrons of the group took off from India to attack the Makasan railroad yards at Bangkok, Thailand. This involved a 2,261 mi (3,639 km) round trip, the longest bombing mission yet attempted during the war.

Difficulties encountered at Chharra forced the unit to move to Dudhkundi Airfield on 1 July 1944, leaving Chharra to become a transport base for Tenth Air Force. C-87 Liberators and C-46 Commandos flew from Chharra into China to support the XX Bomber Command forward bases as well as to the Air Transport Command depot at Barrackpore, picking up supplies. In June 1945, the last Americans left the base, turning it over to the British colonial government.

The post-war history of the airfield is unclear; however, today it is long abandoned. No structures remain though traces of runways and taxiways can be viewed from the air. Some small villages appear to have taken over the former billeting areas.

In the present century, the airfield has been considered to be rebuilt and redeveloped to make it a commercial airport and handle passenger traffic.

== Revival ==
To improve socio-economic development, tourism and connectivity in the western part of West Bengal, the airfield was considered to be revived and redeveloped as a commercial airport to operate passenger traffic in the early 2010s, and was cleared by the Government of West Bengal in 2018. The airfield covers an area of 600 acres, out of which about 300 acres will be used to develop the airport, in which at the first phase of the development project, a flying institute will be built at an area of 25 acres with a runway. The second phase will expand the airport at an area of 272 acres, consisting of a passenger terminal, a runway, an Air Traffic Control (ATC) tower and ancillary facilities and services, which could be acquired easily because the airfield is mostly free of encroachments. The remaining 28 acres will be acquired later, and the entire land area of about 300 acres will become a part of the airport.

As of February 2023, there is no specific deadline given for the completion of the airport's development project, however, the Government of West Bengal has given an assurance that the work is progressing.

As of March 2023, the airport is under development and will include a dimension measuring 2,100 m (6,900 ft) in length and 45 m (148 ft) in width of the existing runway 10/28. However, to handle modern day large commercial and cargo aircraft, it will host a new longer runway which is under evaluation. It will be built at an approx. cost of around ₹300 crore and the date of completion of the project has been set to mid-2025.

As of May 2024, RITES takes up consultancy services for the development of Chharra Airport. Two tenders (Tender Ref. No: RITES/AP/Charra//OLS&TOPO/2024 and RITES/AP/Charra/Geo-Tech/2024) for undertaking Topographic Survey, Obstacle Limitation Surfaces (OLS) Survey and Geo Technical Investigation Work for preparation of DPR have been invited for quotation and bidding.

As of November 2025, following a thorough joint inspection by RITES and the Transport Department of the Government of West Bengal, a decision has been taken to initially develop the airport as a small commercial facility at an estimated cost of ₹150 crore (equivalent to ₹155 crore or US$16 million in 2026). The first phase will develop a 1,100 metres (3,600 ft) runway along with a terminal with a capacity of 160 passengers per day, fire station, an electrical substation, three watch towers, an underground reservoir, and a cooling pit. The phase will upgrade the airstrip to an airport capable to handle 19-seater aircraft operations. Thereafter, during the second phase, the runway will be expanded to 1,100 metres (3,600 ft) so that it can operate ATR 42 class aircraft. The airport will facilitate the industrial and tourism sectors of both West Bengal and Jharkhand.

== See also ==
- Operation Matterhorn
