= 43rd Air Mobility Operations Group =

43rd Air Mobility Operations Group

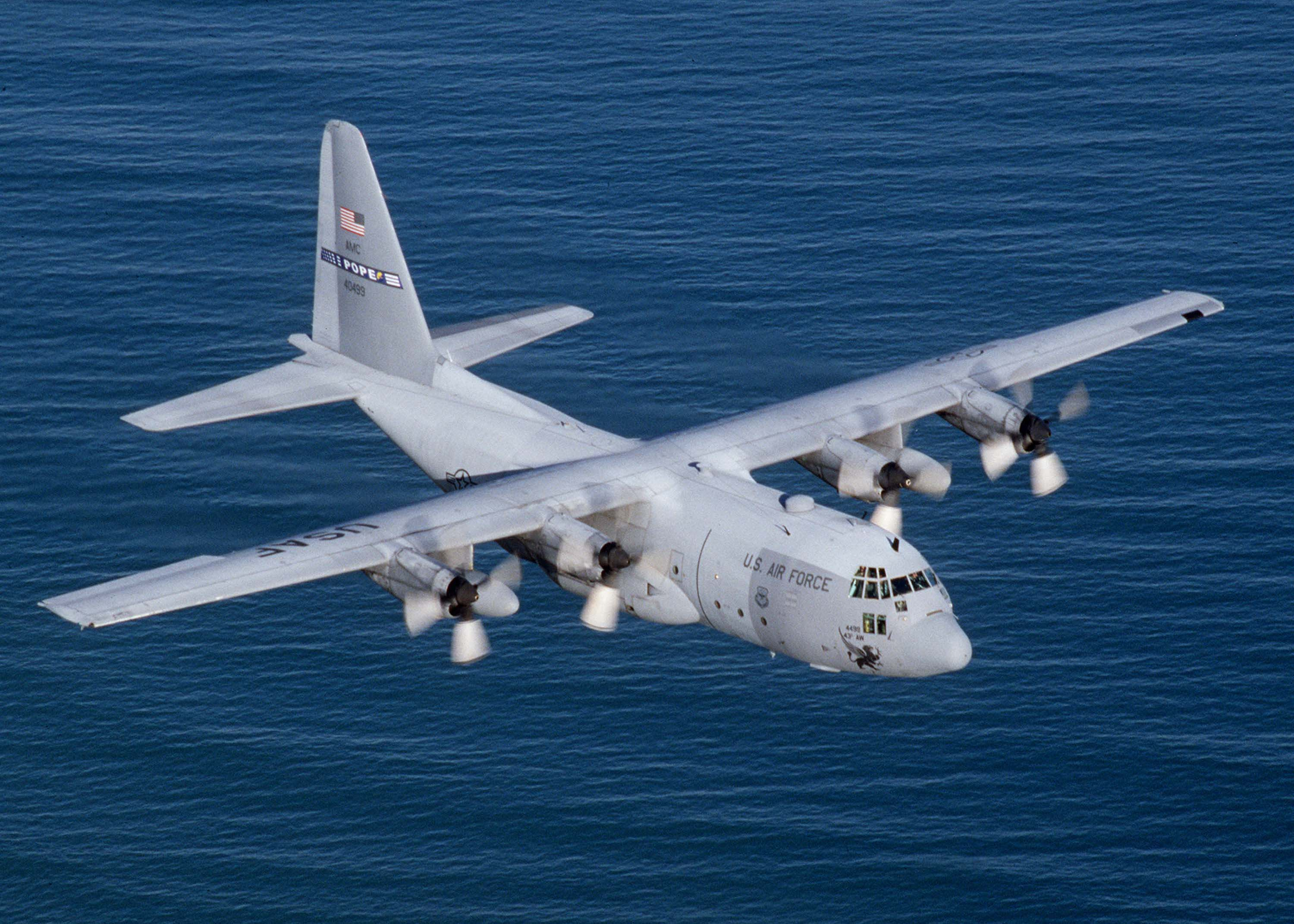
- C-130 Hercules of the 43rd Operations Group (Note: Aircraft is Lockheed C-130E-LM Hercules serial 64-499. Taken at Pope AFB circa 2004.)
- Active: 1941–1946; 1946–1952; 1992–1994; 1997–present
- Country: United States
- Branch: United States Air Force
- Role: Rapid response
- Part of: Air Mobility Command
- Garrison/HQ: Pope Army Airfield
- Nickname: Gryphons
- Mottos: Willing, Able, Ready
- Engagements: Southwest Pacific Theater
- Decorations: Distinguished Unit Citation; Air Force Outstanding Unit Award; Philippine Presidential Unit Citation

Commanders
- Current commander: Col. Brian K. Steinke

Insignia
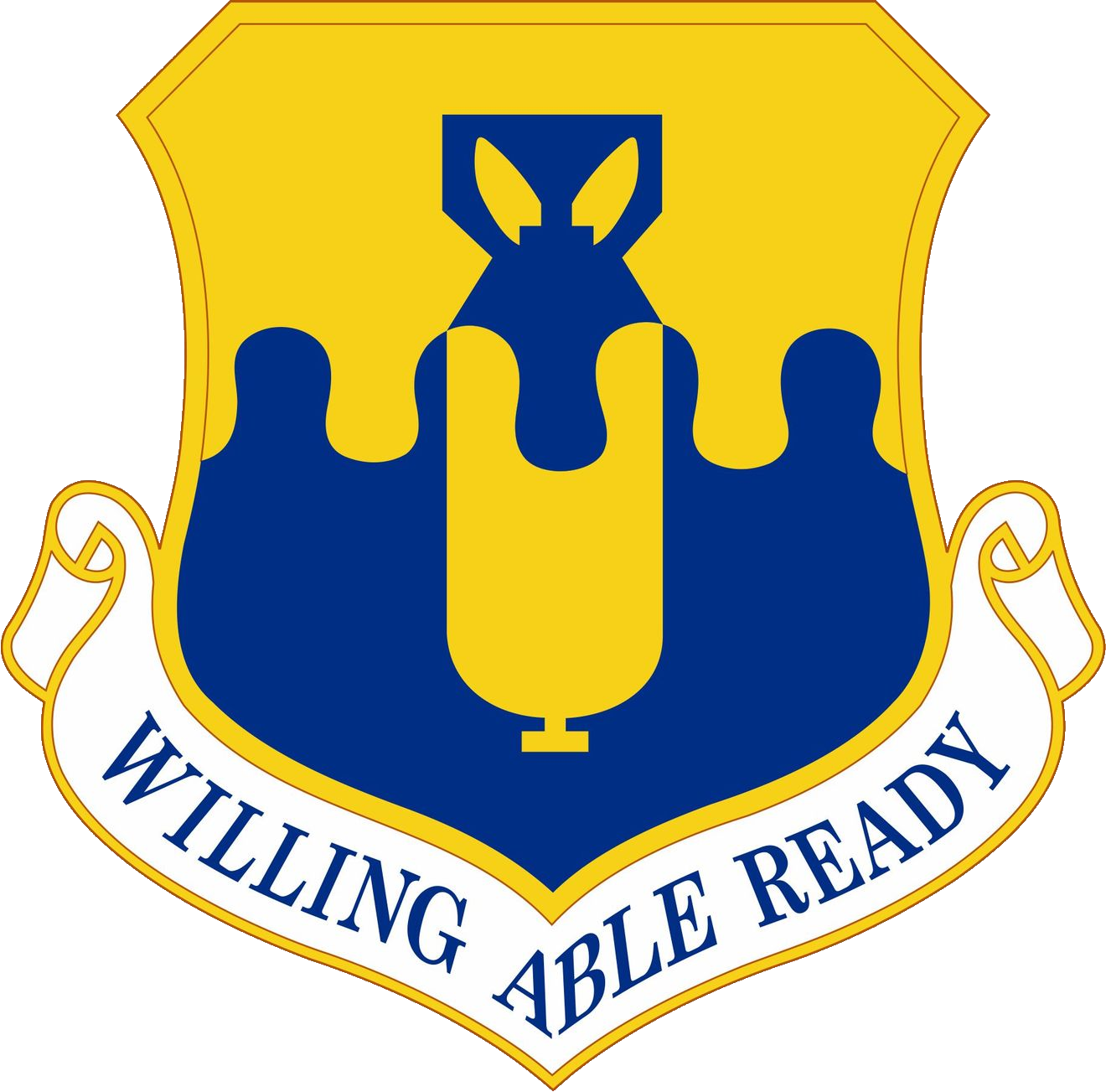
- 43rd Air Mobility Operations Group emblem (As of June 2016)

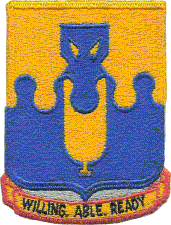
- 43rd Bombardment Group emblem (Note: Approved 31 January 1942.)

The 43rd Air Mobility Operations Group is an active duty air mobility unit at Pope Army Airfield, North Carolina and is part of the Air Mobility Command under the USAF Expeditionary Center. The unit is composed of eight squadrons, including one of the only two active Air Force aeromedical evacuation squadrons based in the United States. The group's primary mission focuses on providing enroute operations and enabling global response and airborne support for Fort Bragg's 82nd Airborne Division.

The 43rd Operations Group was redesignated the 43rd Airlift Group on 1 March 2011 after the inactivation of the 43rd Airlift Wing and entered into an active associate arrangement with the Air Force Reserve Command's colocated 440th Airlift Wing.

In 2016, the 440th Wing was inactivated and both the 440th and the 43rd discontinued their airlift mission with Lockheed C-130 Hercules aircraft.

While the 440th was inactivated, the 43rd was reorganized as a non-flying unit, designated the 43rd Air Mobility Operations Group on 14 June 2016.

In the postwar era, the 43rd Bombardment Group was one of the first United States Army Air Forces (USAAF) units assigned to the Strategic Air Command on 1 October 1946, prior to the establishment of the United States Air Force as a redesignation of the 444th Bombardment Group due to the Air Force's policy of retaining only low-numbered groups on active duty after the war.

It conducted long-range test missions, including the first nonstop flight around the world (26 February-2 March 1949), accomplished in "Lucky Lady II", a B-50A Superfortress (AF Ser. No. 46–0010) commanded by Capt James G Gallagher.

The group became non-operational in February 1951 when its squadrons were attached to the 43rd Bombardment Wing. The group was inactivated in 1952 when the parent wing adopted the Tri-Deputate organization and assigned all of the group's squadrons directly to the wing.

It was redesignated as the 43rd Operations Group and activated, in 1992 when the 43rd Air Refueling Wing adopted the USAF Objective organization plan. From 1994 to 1997 the group was inactive when the wing was reduced to group size. In 2011, the wing was inactivated, and the group received its previous designation, the 43rd Airlift Group. Later, in 2016, the 43rd Airlift Group transitioned to a non-flying mission and was redesignated the 43rd Air Mobility Operations Group as it discontinued airlift operations and reorganized to inherit those non-flying responsibilities inherited from the 440th Airlift Wing following the latter's inactivation.

== Mission ==
As an Air Mobility Command unit, the 43rd Air Mobility Operations Group is part of the air force component of United States Transportation Command. It provides rapid strategic deployment of forces assigned to Joint Special Operations Command, the XVIII Airborne Corps and 82nd Airborne Division. It also provides combatant commanders with airborne joint forcible entry, combat airlift, aerial port, command and control, and other enabling capabilities. The 43d comprises eight squadrons:

- 34th Combat Training Squadron
- 43rd Force Support Squadron
- 43rd Air Mobility Squadron
- 43rd Comptroller Squadron
- 43rd Medical Squadron
- 43rd Operations Support Squadron
- 43rd Communications Squadron
- 49th Combat Training Squadron

== History ==
=== World War II ===
The 43rd Bombardment Group trained for bombardment operations during most of 1941. From December 1941 to February 1942, it flew antisubmarine patrols along the New England coast.

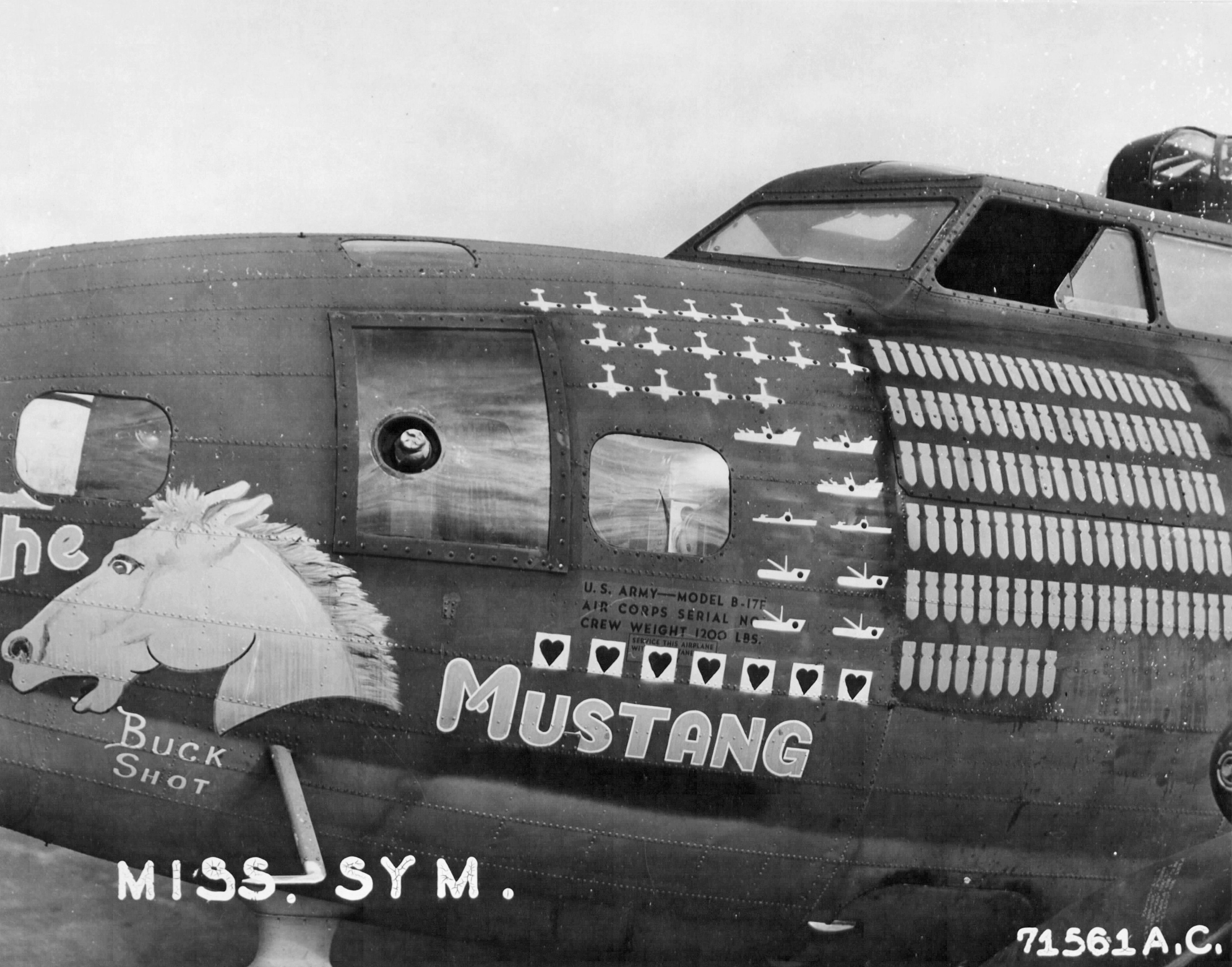
B-17F-25-BO Flying Fortress (AAF Ser. No. 41-24554), "The Mustang", 63rd Bombardment Squadron, 1943

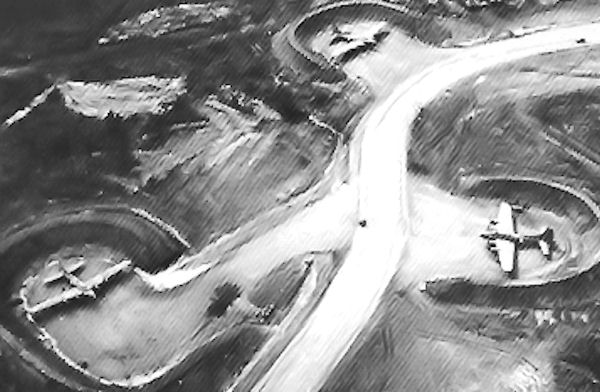
An aerial view of B-17s from the 43rd Bombardment Group parked in their revetments at Seven Mile Airfield, Port Moresby, New Guinea in August 1942. The 43rd Bomb Group was the fifth B-17-equipped group to be deployed against Japan in the Pacific War.

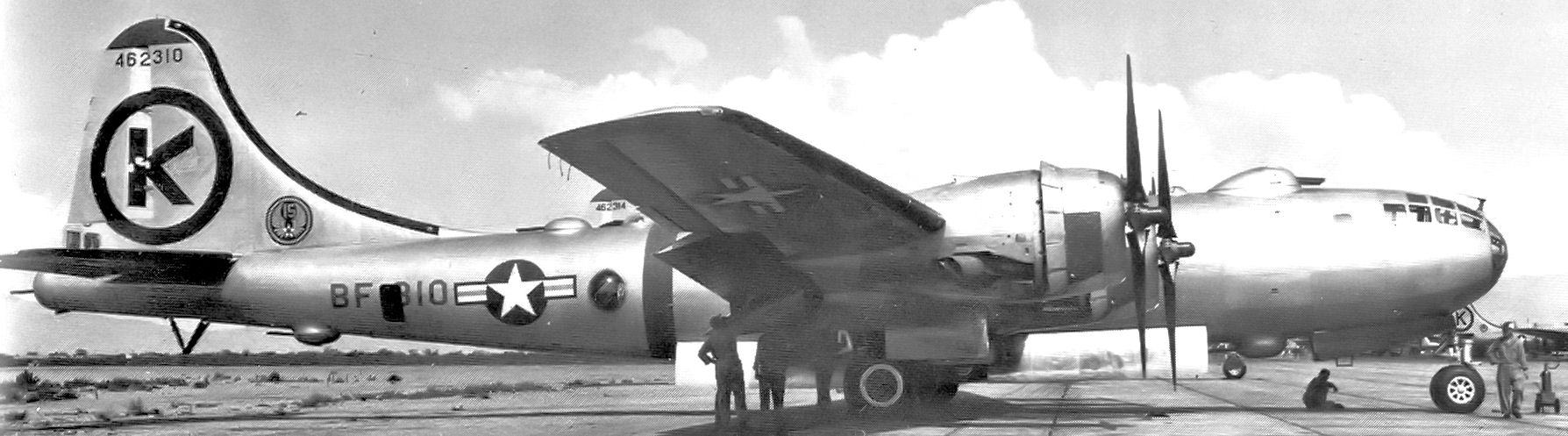
43rd Bombardment Group Boeing B-29A-75-BN Superfortress (AAF Ser. No. 44-62310). SAC, 15th Air Force, Davis-Monthan AAF, Arizona, 1946

It then moved to the Southwest Pacific via Cape Town, South Africa, from February to March 1942. It attacked Japanese shipping in the Netherlands East Indiesand the Bismarck Archipelago from bases in Australia, New Guinea, and Owi Airfield, Indonesia between August 1942 and November 1944.

While there it earned a Distinguished Unit Citation (DUC) for missions over Papua, New Guinea from August 1942 to January 1943.

The unit used skip bombing to sink Japanese ships during the Battle of the Bismarck Sea, 2–4 March 1943, for which the unit earned a second DUC. It also provided support for ground forces on New Guinea and attacked airfields and other enemy installations in New Guinea, the Bismarck Archipelago, Yap, Palau, and the southern Philippines in 1943 and 1944.

The group conducted long-range raids on oil refineries on Ceram and Borneo late in the war.

After moving to the Philippines in November 1944, the group attacked shipping along the Asiatic coast and struck factories, airfields, and other installations in China and on Formosa. It also supported ground forces on Luzon.

The unit moved to Ie Shima in July 1945, from which it conducted raids against airfields and railways in Japan and against shipping in the Inland Sea and the Sea of Japan. It was moved, on paper, to the Philippines in December 1945 and inactivated in April 1946.

=== Cold War ===
The 43rd Bombardment Group was again activated in 1946, when it assumed the mission, personnel and equipment of the 444th Bombardment Group, which was inactivated. Until February 1951, the group trained and conducted long-range test missions, including the first nonstop flight around the world (26 February–2 March 1949), accomplished by Capt James G. Gallagher and his crew in a Boeing B-50 Superfortress called Lucky Lady II.

The group deployed to England for training, August to November 1949. It was not operational after 10 February 1951, and, the flying squadrons were attached directly to the 43rd Bomb Wing for operations. The group was inactivated on 16 June 1952.

=== Modern era ===
On 1 June 1992, the group was redesignated as the 43rd Operations Group, and was activated on the same day. Between June 1992 and 1 July 1994, the group flew air refueling missions in training exercises and was then inactivated.

In 1997, it was reactivated and assumed an airlift mission. It cooperated with U.S. Army airborne organizations at nearby Fort Bragg, North Carolina, taking part with them in joint training exercises. Crews and aircraft deployed to Europe, and later to Southwest Asia, to support contingency operations such as enforcement of no-fly zones over Iraq and for expeditionary force rotations.

After terrorist attacks on the United States on 11 September 2001, the group deployed resources in the Global War on Terror. The group was redesignated 43rd Airlift Group on 1 March 2011 and 43rd Air Mobility Operations Group on 14 June 2016.

== Lineage ==
- Constituted as the 43rd Bombardment Group (Heavy) on 20 November 1940

Activated on 15 January 1941
Redesignated 43rd Bombardment Group, Heavy on 21 September 1943
Inactivated on 29 April 1946

- Redesignated 43rd Bombardment Group, Very Heavy on 1 October 1946

Activated on 1 October 1946
Redesignated 43rd Bombardment Group, Medium on 2 July 1948
Inactivated on 16 June 1952

- Redesignated 43rd Operations Group and activated on 1 June 1992

Inactivated on 1 July 1994

- Activated on 1 April 1997

Redesignated 43rd Airlift Group on 1 March 2011
Redesignated 43rd Air Mobility Operations Group on 14 June 2016

=== Assignments ===
- General Headquarters, Air Force (later, Air Force Combat Command), 15 January 1941
- Northeast Air District (later, 1 Air Force), January 1941
- I Bomber Command, c. 5 September 1941
- United States Army Forces in Australia, c. 28 March 1942
- Allied Air Forces, Southwest Pacific Areas, 18 April 1942
- Fifth Air Force, 3 September 1942
- V Bomber Command, 5 September 1942
- Far East Air Forces, 3 December 1945 – 29 April 1946
- Fifteenth Air Force, 1 October 1946
- Eighth Air Force, 19 November 1946
- 43rd Bombardment Wing, 17 November 1947 – 16 June 1952

Attached to 3rd Air Division, 16 August – 16 November 1949

- 43rd Air Refueling Wing, 1 June 1992 – 1 July 1994
- 43rd Airlift Wing, 1 April 1997
- USAF Expeditionary Center, 1 March 2011 – present

=== Components ===
- 2nd Airlift Squadron: 1 April 1997 – 14 June 2016
- 2nd Air Refueling Squadron: attached 1 July 1949 – 16 September 1950
- 3rd Aerial Port Squadron: 1 April 1997 – 30 June 2015
- 13th Reconnaissance Squadron: 15 January 1941 – 29 April 1946 (became 403 BS on 22 April 1942)
- 28th Air Refueling Squadron: 1 June 1992 – 15 May 1994
- 41st Airlift Squadron: 1 April 1997 – 9 April 2007
- 43rd Aeromedical Evacuation Squadron: 1 April 1997 – present
- 43rd Air Base Squadron: 1 July 2015 – present
- 43rd Air Mobility Squadron: 1 July 2015 – present
- 43rd Air Refueling Squadron: 19 July 1948 – 16 June 1952 (detached after 10 February 1951)
- 43rd Aircraft Maintenance Squadron: 1 April 1997 – 30 June 2015
- 63rd Bombardment Squadron: 15 January 1941 – 29 April 1946; 1 October 1946 – 16 June 1952 (detached after 10 February 1951)
- 64th Bombardment Squadron: 15 January 1941 – 29 April 1946; 1 October 1946 – 16 June 1952 (detached after 10 February 1951)
- 65th Bombardment Squadron: 15 January 1941 – 29 April 1946; 1 October 1946 – 16 June 1952 (detached after 10 February 1951)
- 91st Air Refueling Squadron: 1 June 1992 – 1 July 1994
- 97th Air Refueling Squadron: 1 October 1992 – 1 April 1994
- 307th Air Refueling Squadron: attached 16 September 1950 – 9 February 1951
- 350th Air Refueling Squadron: 1 October 1993 – 1 July 1994
- 403rd Bombardment Squadron: 15 January 1941 – 29 April 1946
- 905th Air Refueling Squadron: 1 July – 1 October 1993
- 906th Air Refueling Squadron: 1 June 1992 – 30 January 1994
- 917th Air Refueling Squadron: 1 October 1993 – 1 July 1994

=== Stations ===
- Langley Field, Virginia, 15 January 1941
- Dow Field, Maine, 28 August 1941 – 17 February 1942
- Sydney Airport, Australia, 28 March 1942
- Longreach Airport, Australia, c. 1 August 1942
- Port Moresby Airfield Complex, New Guinea 14 September 1942
- Dobodura Airfield Complex, New Guinea, 10 December 1943
- Nadzab Airfield Complex, New Guinea, 4 March 1944
- Owi Airfield, Schouten Islands, 2 July 1944
- Tacloban Airfield, Leyte, Philippines, c. 15 November 1944
- Clark Field, Luzon, Philippines, 16 March 1945
- Ie Shima, Okinawa, 26 July 1945
- Fort William McKinley, Luzon, Philippines, 10 December 1945 – 29 April 1946
- Davis-Monthan Air Force Base, Arizona, 1 October 1946 – 16 June 1952

Deployed at RAF Marham, England, 16 August – 16 November 1949

- Malmstrom Air Force Base, Montana, 1 June 1992 – 1 July 1994
- Pope Air Force Base (later Pope Army Airfield), North Carolina, 1 April 1997 – present

=== Aircraft ===
- B-18 Bolo, 1941
- B-25 Mitchell, 1941
- PT-17 Stearman, 1941
- A-29 Hudson, 1941
- LB-30 Liberator 1941
- B-17 Flying Fortress, 1941–1943
- B-24 Liberator, 1943–1946
- B-29 Superfortress, 1946–1948
- B-50 Superfortress, 1948–1951
- KC-135 Stratotanker, 1992–1994
- C-12 Huron, 1994
- C-130 Hercules, 1997–2016

== See also ==
- United States Army Air Forces in Australia
