= Ōshima, Fukuoka =

Dissolved municipality in Fukuoka prefecture, Japan

Ōshima (大島村, Ōshima-mura) was a village located in Munakata District, Fukuoka Prefecture, Japan. The village consisted of the island of Okinoshima and an island also named Ōshima.

As of 2003, the village had an estimated population of 873 and a density of 107.25 persons per km^{2}. The total area was 8.14 km^{2}.

On March 28, 2005, Ōshima was merged into the expanded city of Munakata.
