= Dudhkundi Airfield =

Airfield in India

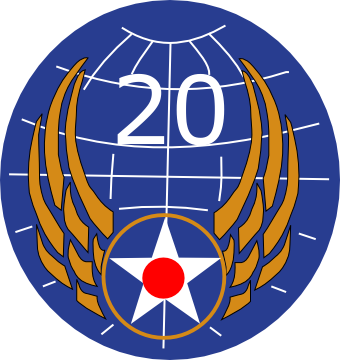
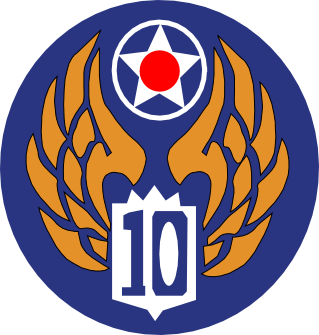
Dudhkundi Airfield
- Part of Twentieth Air Force; Tenth Air Force
- West Bengal, India

Site information
- Type: Military airfield
- Condition: Abandoned

Location
- Coordinates: 22°19′21.16″N 087°06′33.62″E

Site history
- Built: 1942
- In use: 1942-1945
- Battles/wars: World War II

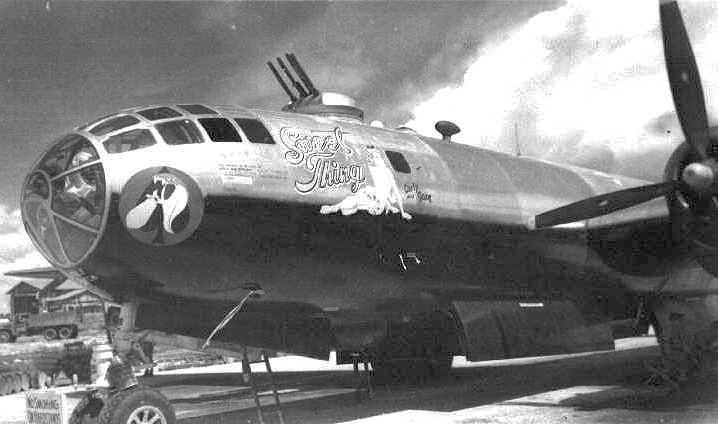
678th Bomb Squadron 44-70108 "Sweet Thing". Notice the black paint applied to the under surface of the aircraft. This was applied to reduce reflection of Japanese searchlights when flying low-level night incendiary missions.

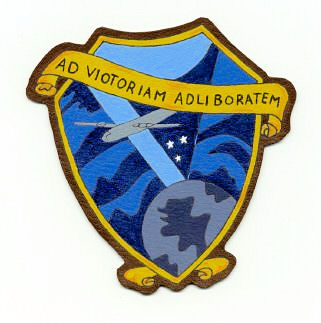
Emblem of the 444th Bombardment Squadron

Dudhkundi Airfield is an abandoned airfield in India, located 12 miles (19.2 km) SE of Jhargram, in the Jhargram district in the Indian state of West Bengal.

== History ==
During World War II, the airfield hosted the United States Army Air Force 444th Bombardment Group prior to its deployment to the Mariana Islands.

Dudhkundi was originally designed for B-24 Liberator use. In 1943 it was designated as a B-29 Superfortress Base for the planned deployment of the United States Army Air Forces XX Bomber Command to India. Advance Army Air Forces echelons arrived in India in December 1943 to organize the upgrading of the airfield and thousands of Indians labored to upgrade the facility for Superfortress operations. It was one of four B-29 bases established by the Americans in India.

Finally ready for use in July 1944, the 444th Bombardment Group moved to Dudhkundi from Charra Airfield. The 444th was part of the Operation Matterhorn project of XX Bomber Command, the bombing of the Japanese Home Islands. In order to reach Japan, the B-29s of the group needed to stage operations from Kwanghan Airfield (A-3), a forward base just to the southwest of Chendu in south-central China.

However, all the supplies of fuel, bombs, and spares needed to support operations from Kwanghan had to be flown 1,200 miles from India over "The Hump" (the name given by Allied pilots to the eastern end of the Himalayan Mountains), since Japanese control of the seas around the Chinese coast made seaborne supply of China impossible. Many of the supplies had to be delivered to China by the B-29s themselves. For this role, they were stripped of nearly all combat equipment and used as flying tankers and each carried seven tons of fuel for the six-hour (one-way) flight, which itself was almost at the limit of the B-29's range. The Hump route was so dangerous and difficult that each time a B-29 flew from India to China it was counted as a combat mission. It took six round-trip flights by each Superfortress to Kwanghan in order to mount one combat mission from the forward base.

Missions of the 444th flown from Dudhkundi included attacking transportation centers, naval installations, aircraft plants, and other targets in Burma, China, Thailand, Japan, and Formosa.

On the night August 10–11, 56 B-29s staged through British air bases in Ceylon (now known is Sri Lanka) attacked the Plajdoe oil storage facilities at Palembang on Sumatra in present-day Indonesia. This involved a 4030-mile, 19-hour mission from Ceylon to Sumatra, the longest American air raid of the war. The 444th conducted a daylight raid against iron and steel works at Yawata, Japan, in August 1944, being awarded a Distinguished Unit Citation for the mission.

In September 1944, the 679th Bomb Squadron was inactivated in order to streamline the group's organization. This left the 444th with three squadrons of ten B-29s each.

The 444th evacuated staging fields in China in January 1945 due to the Japanese offensive in South China which threatened the forward staging bases, but continued operations from India, bombing targets in Thailand and mining waters around Singapore. However, by late 1944 it was becoming apparent that B-29 operations against Japan staged out of the bases in Chengtu were far too expensive in men and materials and would have to be stopped. In December 1944, the Joint Chiefs of Staff made the decision that Operation Matterhorn would be phased out, and the B-29s would be moved to newly captured bases in the Marianas in the central Pacific.

On 1 March 1945, the 444th Bombardment Group flew south to Ceylon, then southeast across the Indian Ocean to Perth in Western Australia. Flying north through New Guinea, it reached its new home at West Field, Tinian, in the Mariana Islands on 7 April where it and its parent 58th Bombardment Wing came under the command of the new XXI Bomber Command.

With the departure of the B-29s to the Marianas, Dudhkundi Airfield was turned over to the Tenth Air Force. The 87th Air Depot Group took over command of the airfield, and the mission of the base was to be a maintenance and disposition center for surplus Allied aircraft.

The 80th Fighter Group moved in on 24 May from its primitive base at Myitkyina, Burma, with a mixture of P-38 Lightnings, A-36 Apaches and dive-bomber modified P-40 Warhawk (B-40) being withdrawn from combat. The 80th returned to the United States in October 1945, leaving its aircraft and equipment at the airfield.

With its departure, the B-24 Liberator equipped 7th Bombardment Group moved to Dudhkundi. It remained at the airfield, also leaving its aircraft and equipment in India and sending its personnel back to the United States. It was inactivated as a paper unit in January 1946.

With the last Americans leaving in early 1946, the airfield was turned over to the British colonial government.

Prior to World War II, Dudhkundi was a forest belonging to the king of Jhargram who rendered it to the United States Army Air Force to build an Airfield. The postwar history of the airfield is unclear, however today it is long abandoned. No structures remain, however traces of runways and taxiways can be viewed from the air. Airfield has been converted into an air-to-ground firing range to Kalaikunda Air Force Station. Some small villages appear to have taken over the former billeting areas.

== See also ==
- Operation Matterhorn
