= Advance airfield =

Operational support airstrips with limited facilities

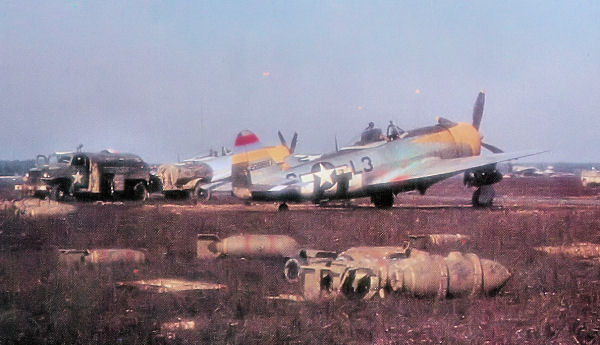
An advance airfield in use during the Second World War in Asch, Belgium, March/April 1945

Advance airfield and forward airfield are military terms for a relatively primitive ad-hoc airfield used for refueling and re-arming air units as part of forward operations near the enemy. Also called advanced airfield for its advanced position, not advanced facilities, such an airfield typically does not carry full aircraft maintenance and service units, and lacks the comfort and security of a major air base. Advance airfields may be subject to enemy observation and attack. They may be expected to change hands after a battle.

The advantages of using advance airfields are various. Air raids can penetrate deeper into enemy-held territory, surprising the enemy with unexpected range. Air units stationed nearer the front can respond more quickly to the needs of friendly land and naval units. Damaged aircraft can land at the advance airfield to save those aboard, and possibly the aircraft. Wounded personnel can be brought to the advance airfield to be evacuated for more complete hospital care at the rear. Shorter-range aircraft such as fighters can stage from an advance airfield to escort longer-range bombers in formation.

== See also ==
- Advanced Landing Ground
- Index of aviation articles
- Airstrip
- Highway strip
- Forward operating base
- Satellite airfield
- STOLport
- Forward arming and refuelling point
- Brodie landing system
