= Crystal L. Hoyt =

American social psychologist (born 1975)

Crystal L. Hoyt (born 21 February 1975) is an American social psychologist.

Hoyt attended Claremont McKenna College, where she studied psychology and graduated with a bachelor's degree in 1997. She pursued further study in the subject at University of California, Santa Barbara, completing her doctorate in 2003. Hoyt began teaching at the University of Richmond Jepson School of Leadership Studies in 2003 as an assistant professor. She became an associate professor in 2009, and later succeeded Donelson R. Forsyth as Colonel Leo K. & Gaylee Thorsness Endowed Chair in Ethical Leadership.
