= Eugene V. Lux =

American politician (1926–2019)

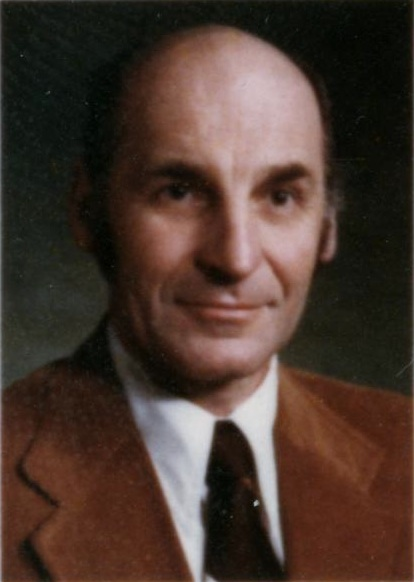
- Lux in 1977

Member of the Washington Senate from the 11th district
- In office May 31, 1988 – January 9, 1989
- Preceded by: Avery Garrett
- Succeeded by: Leo K. Thorsness

Member of the Washington House of Representatives from the 11th district
- In office January 10, 1983 – May 31, 1988
- Preceded by: Michael E. Patrick
- Succeeded by: Margarita Prentice

Member of the Washington House of Representatives from the 35th district
- In office August 18, 1975 – January 10, 1983
- Preceded by: William "Bill" Chatalas
- Succeeded by: Max Vekich

Member of the Washington Senate from the 35th district
- In office August 1, 1973 – November 6, 1973
- Preceded by: Robert C. "Bob" Ridder
- Succeeded by: Ruthe Ridder

Personal details
- Born: August 16, 1926 Lincoln, Nebraska, U.S.
- Died: June 21, 2019 (aged 92) Seattle, Washington, U.S.
- Party: Democratic
- Occupation: Self-employed building contractor

Eugene Victor "Gene" Lux (August 16, 1926 – June 21, 2019) was an American politician of the Democratic Party. He was a member of the Washington House of Representatives, representing the 35th Legislative District and then the 11th Legislative District for more than six and five years, respectively. Lux was also appointed to two brief stints in the Washington State Senate in the 35th and 11th legislative districts in 1973 and 1988, respectively.

In 2009, Lux unsuccessfully ran for the office of King County, Washington Assessor. As of 2017, the 91 year-old Lux was serving his seventh four-year term as Commissioner of King County Fire District 20. He died on June 21, 2019, aged 92.

He was born in Lincoln, Nebraska and worked as a self-employed building contractor.
