= Senator Ridder =

Senator Ridder may refer to:

- Robert Ridder (politician) (1927–2021), Washington State Senate
- Ruthe Ridder (born 1929), Washington State Senate
