= 2666 (disambiguation) =

2666 is the last novel by Roberto Bolaño, released in 2004. 2666 may also refer to:

- 2-6-6-6, a Whyte notation classification of steam locomotive
- 2666 Gramme, a minor planet
- 2666 BC
- 2666 AD/CE in the 27th century
- Old 666, a USAAF heavy bomber with the serial number 41-2666
