= 65th Special Operations Squadron =

U.S. Air Force Special Operations Squadron

65th Special Operations Squadron

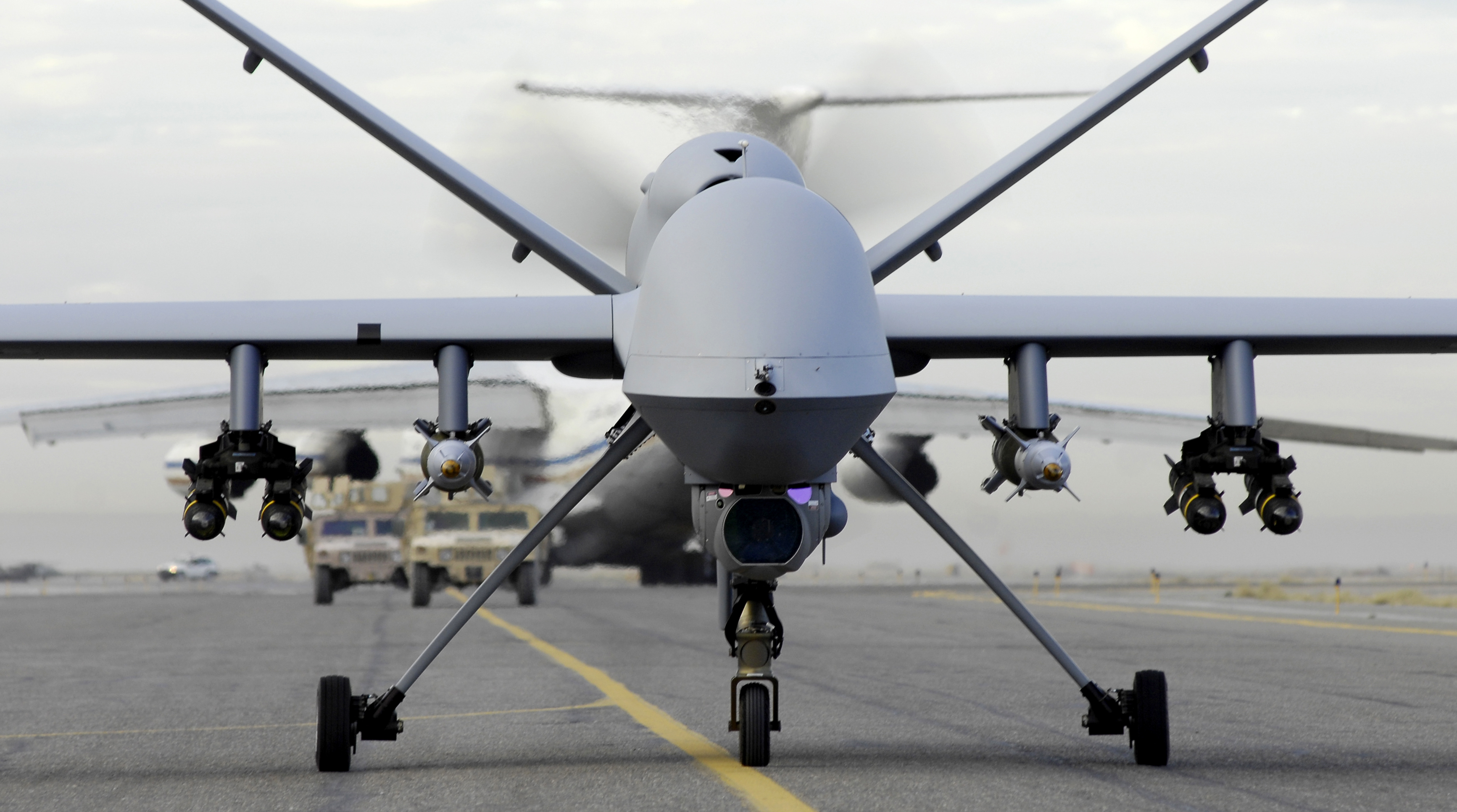
- MQ-9 Reaper as operated by the squadron
- Active: 1941–1946; 1946–1970; 1986–1991; 2018–present
- Country: United States
- Branch: United States Air Force
- Role: Special Operations Attack and Reconnaissance
- Part of: Air Force Special Operations Command
- Nickname: Lucky Dicers
- Motto: Scientiam Fortuna Iuvat (Latin for 'Fortune Favors the Knowing')
- Engagements: Antisubmarine Campaign; Southwest Pacific Theater
- Decorations: Distinguished Unit Citation; Air Force Outstanding Unit Award; Philippine Presidential Unit Citation

Insignia
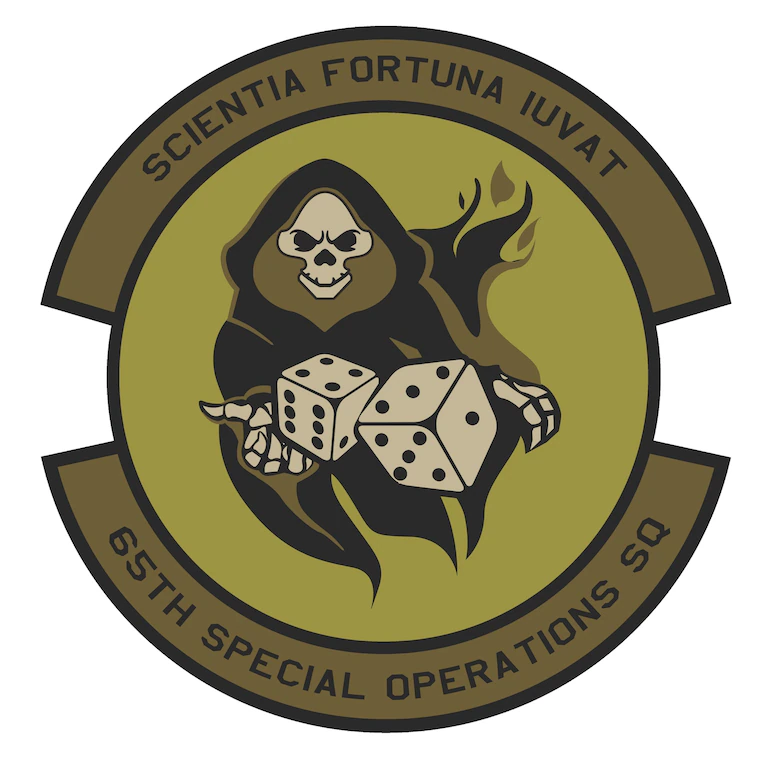
- 65th Special Operations Squadron emblem (subdued)

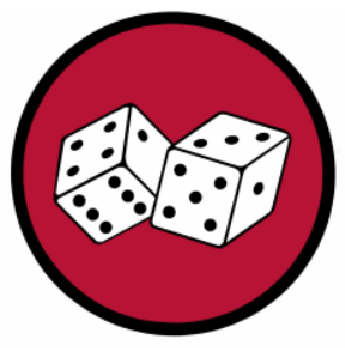
- 65th Bombardment Squadron emblem (Note: Approved 9 September 1954. Description: On a disc red, bordered black, a pair of dice tilted at an angle so that the four and three are showing at the top and the six and five are shown on the tilted front view. Although not approved until 1954, this emblem was used by the squadron during World War II during the time it flew B-24 Liberators. Watkins, pp. 84-85.)

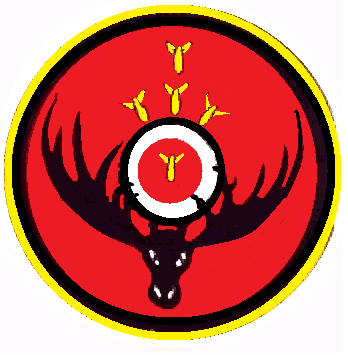
- 65th Bombardment Squadron emblem (Note: Used by the squadron in the Southwest Pacific during the time it flew B-17 Flying Fortresses. Watkins, pp. 84-85.)

The 65th Special Operations Squadron is an Air Force Special Operations Command unit which flies the General Atomics MQ-9 Reaper at Hurlburt Field, Florida. The squadron was first activated as the 65th Bombardment Squadron in January 1941, one of the original squadrons of the 43rd Bombardment Group. Following the attack on Pearl Harbor, the squadron participated in antisubmarine patrols until January 1942, when it moved to Australia and the Southwest Pacific Theater. It moved forward with US forces through New Guinea and the Philippines, moving to Ie Shima shortly before V-J Day for operations against Japan. It earned two Distinguished Unit Citations and a Philippine Presidential Unit Citation for combat operations. During this period, a crew from the 65th became the most decorated aircrew in United States history, when their B-17 fought off twenty Japanese fighters during a photo reconnaissance mission. The squadron was inactivated in the Philippines in April 1946.

The squadron was activated again in October 1946 at Davis-Monthan Field, Arizona, when it assumed the resources of another unit. It operated propeller-driven Boeing B-29 Superfortresses and Boeing B-50 Superfortresses until 1954, when it upgraded to the jet Boeing B-47 Stratojet. In 1960, the squadron moved to Carswell Air Force Base, Texas, where it became one of the Air Force's first supersonic Convair B-58 Hustler units. In 1962, a crew from the 65th won the Mackay Trophy and the Bendix Trophy for setting a trio of transcontinental speed records in a round trip from Los Angeles to New York and back during Operation Heat Rise. It was inactivated in 1970 with the retirement of the B-58.

From 1986 to 1991, as the 65th Strategic Squadron, it controlled bombers and tankers deployed at Anderson Air Force Base, Guam. It was activated in its current role in December 2018.

== Mission ==
The 65th Special Operations Squadron, provides combatant commanders intelligence, surveillance and reconnaissance (ISR) and precision strike capabilities through remotely piloted aircraft operations around the globe.

== History ==
=== World War II ===
==== Initial organization and training ====
The squadron was first activated at Langley Field, Virginia as one of the original four squadrons of the 43d Bombardment Group, in the buildup of the United States military forces prior to the American entry into World War II. It was equipped with the Boeing B-17 Flying Fortress that it would fly in combat, but also flew North American B-25 Mitchells for training.

The squadron moved to Army Air Base Bangor, Maine at the end of August. Following the Japanese attack on Pearl Harbor, the squadron conducted antisubmarine patrols off the Atlantic coast until January 1942, and began moving to reinforce American forces in the Southwest Pacific Theater the following month.

==== Combat in the Southwest Pacific Theatre ====
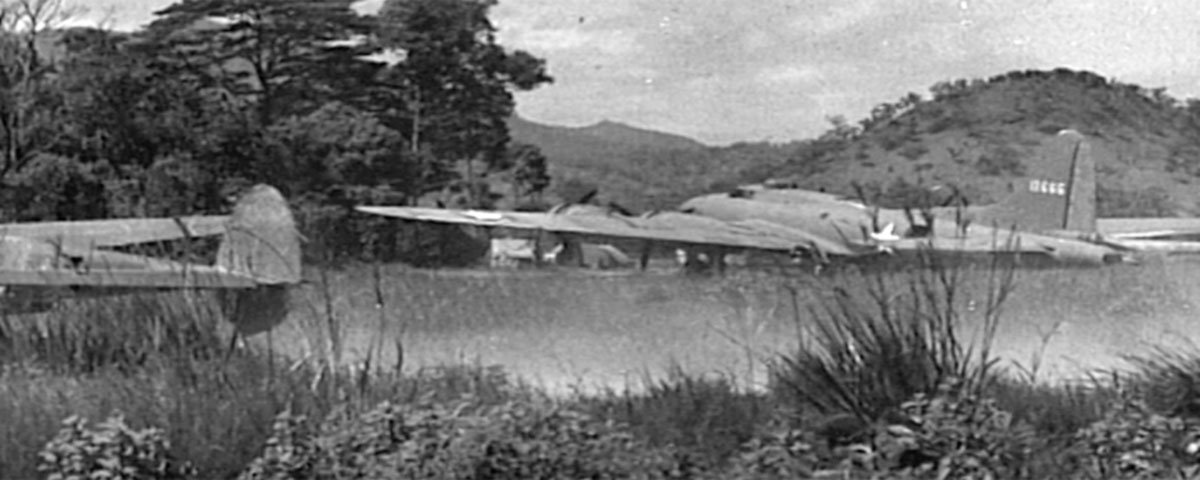
Squadron B-17 at Port Moresby. (Note: Aircraft is Boeing B-17E, serial 41-2666, "Old 666" or "Lucy". This is the aircraft flown by Jay Zeamer and his crew in which he and Joseph Sarnoski earned the Medal of Honor. It was transferred to the 65th Squadron from the 435th Bombardment Squadron. Later transferred to the 8th Photographic Reconnaissance Squadron, to which it was assigned when this photograph was taken.)

The squadron reached Australia via Cape Town in March 1942. It was originally equipped with B-17s for combat operations. The squadron operated from bases in Australia until January 1943, when it moved to New Guinea. Between May and September 1942 the squadron replaced its B-17s with Consolidated B-24 Liberators, believed to be more suited to the long ranges of many Pacific missions. It attacked Japanese shipping in the Netherlands East Indies and the Bismarck Archipelago. It experimented with skip bombing and used this technique during the Battle of the Bismarck Sea in March 1943. During this battle, it made repeated attacks against an enemy convoy bringing reinforcements to Japanese forces in New Guinea. For this action, the squadron was awarded a Distinguished Unit Citation. During this period, the squadron also provided air support for ground forces in New Guinea. It attacked airfields and enemy installations in New Guinea, the Bismarck Archipelago, Celebes, Halmahera, Yap, Palau, and the southern Philippines.

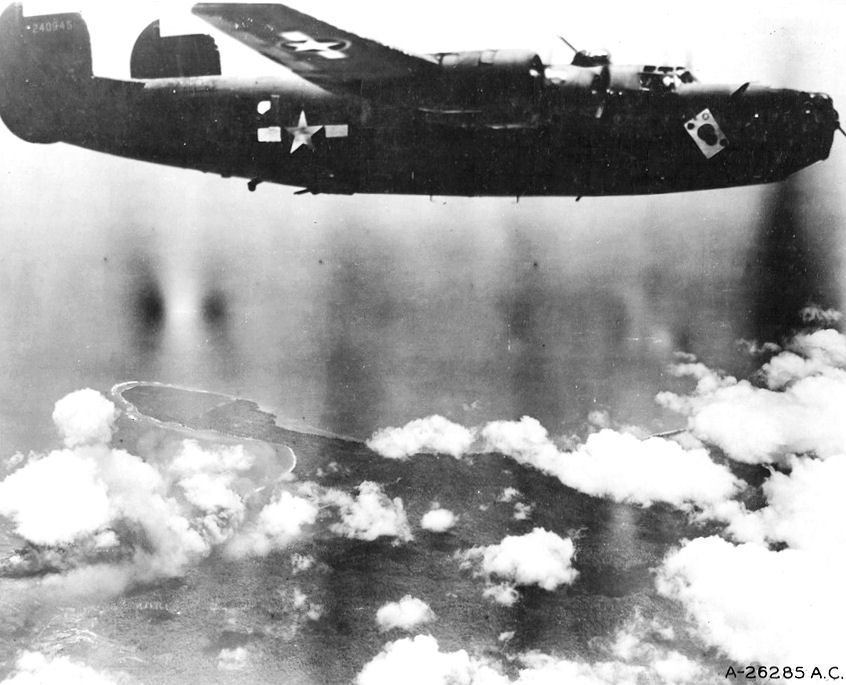
Squadron B-24 Liberator in December 1943 (Note: Aircraft is Consolidated B-24D-115-CO Liberator, serial 42-40945 "The Ace O' Spades". Photo taken 20 December 1943.)

In November 1944 the squadron moved to the Philippines, helping the ground campaign on Luzon as well as conducting bombing missions against airfields, industrial installations and enemy installations in China and Formosa. In July 1945 it moved to Ie Shima Airfield, from which it flew missions over Japan, attacking railroads and airfields, as well as shipping in the Seto Inland Sea until V-J Day. After ceasing operations, the squadron sent its aircraft to the Philippines for reclamation and relocated to Fort William McKinley, near Manila, largely as a paper unit. Although not fully equipped or manned after November 1945, it was finally inactivated in April 1946.

==== Medal of Honor ====
On 16 June 1943, Captain Jay Zeamer Jr. and his crew flew a photographic mapping mission to map the west coast of Bougainville Island, adding a reconnaissance of the enemy airfield on nearby Buka Island prior to beginning the mapping run. When the mapping was nearly complete, their B-17 was attacked by at least nine enemy fighters. The bombardier, Second Lieutenant Joseph Sarnoski, helped fight off the first fighter attacks, permitting Captain Zeamer to complete the mapping. During a coordinated attack of three Japanese Zeros on the nose of the B-17, Sarnoski drove off one before a 20-millimeter shell knocked him back from his gun. Despite being mortally wounded, he crawled back to his gun in time to drive off another fighter pressing an attack on the nose. At that point Sarnoski collapsed over his gun. After a precipitous dive from 20,000 feet to around 10,000 feet for oxygen, Captain Zeamer, though grievously wounded in his arms and legs, violently maneuvered the bomber, successfully evading further damage despite repeated attacks by the Japanese fighters. After a total of 40 minutes of running combat, the remaining Japanese fighters broke off their attacks and returned to Buka. Zeamer, while lapsing in and out of consciousness, directed the plane to Dobodura, an Allied base inland of New Guinea's east coast. Both men were awarded the Medal of Honor for their actions.

As a result of this mission, the Zeamer crew has been called the most highly decorated aircrew in United States Air Force history. The rest of the crew members on the 16 June 1943 mission were awarded the Distinguished Service Cross. (Note: There were two other occasions on which two members of an AAF crew were awarded Medals of Honor for the same mission, and one other occasion in which all members of a crew were awarded a Distinguished Service Cross, but there was never a combination such as this. Hayes.)

=== Strategic Air Command ===
==== Early SAC operations ====
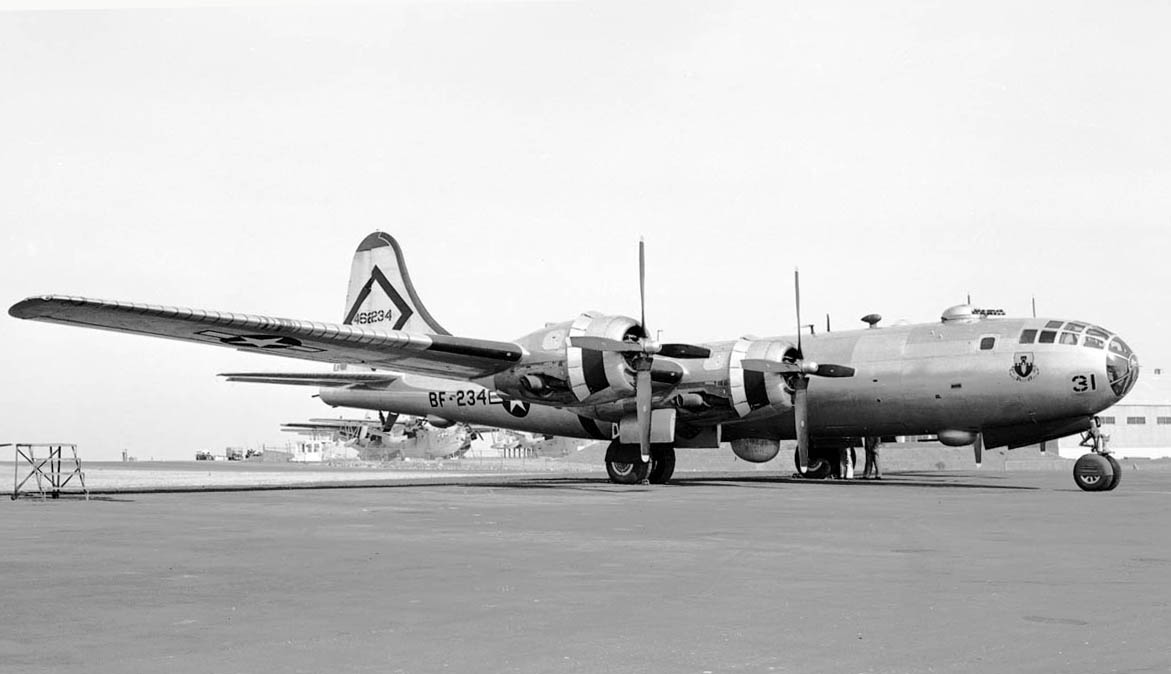
43d Group B-29 Superfortress (Note: Aircraft is Boeing B-29A-70-BN Superfortress, serial 44-62234. Taken at San Francisco in 1947.)

The squadron was reactivated under Strategic Air Command (SAC) at Davis-Monthan Field, Arizona on 1 October 1946 and, along with the other squadrons of the 43rd Group, absorbed the personnel and Boeing B-29 Superfortresses of the 40th and 444th Bombardment Groups, which were simultaneously inactivated. It was one of the first operational Boeing B-29 Superfortress squadrons of SAC and trained for strategic bombardment missions during the postwar years; began upgrading to the improved Boeing B-50 Superfortress, an advanced version of the B-29 in 1948.

SAC’s mobilization for the Korean War highlighted that SAC wing commanders focused too much on running the base organization and not overseeing actual combat preparations. To allow wing commanders the ability to focus on combat operations, the air base group commander became responsible for managing the base housekeeping functions. Under the plan implemented in February 1951 and finalized in June 1952, the wing commander focused primarily on the combat units and the maintenance necessary to support combat aircraft by having the combat and maintenance squadrons report directly to the wing and eliminating the intermediate group structures. the squadron was attached to the 43d Bombardment Wing in February 1951, then assigned permanently in June 1952. (Note: This reorganization, called the "Dual Deputy" Organization. Under this plan flying squadrons reported to the wing Deputy Commander for Operations and maintenance squadrons reported to the wing Deputy Commander for Maintenance)

The emergence of the Soviet MiG-15 interceptor in the skies of North Korea signaled the end of the propeller-driven B-50 as a first-line strategic bomber. It replaced them with new Boeing B-47E Stratojet swept-wing medium bombers in 1954, capable of flying at high subsonic speeds. In the late 1950s, the B-47 was considered to be reaching obsolescence, and was being phased out of SAC's strategic arsenal. The squadron began sending aircraft to other B-47 wings as replacements in late 1959. The squadron moved on paper to Carswell Air Force Base, Texas in early 1960, in preparation for receiving the new Convair B-58 Hustler supersonic medium bomber, sending the last of its B-47s to the Aerospace Maintenance and Regeneration Center (AMARC) in early 1960.

==== B-58 operations ====
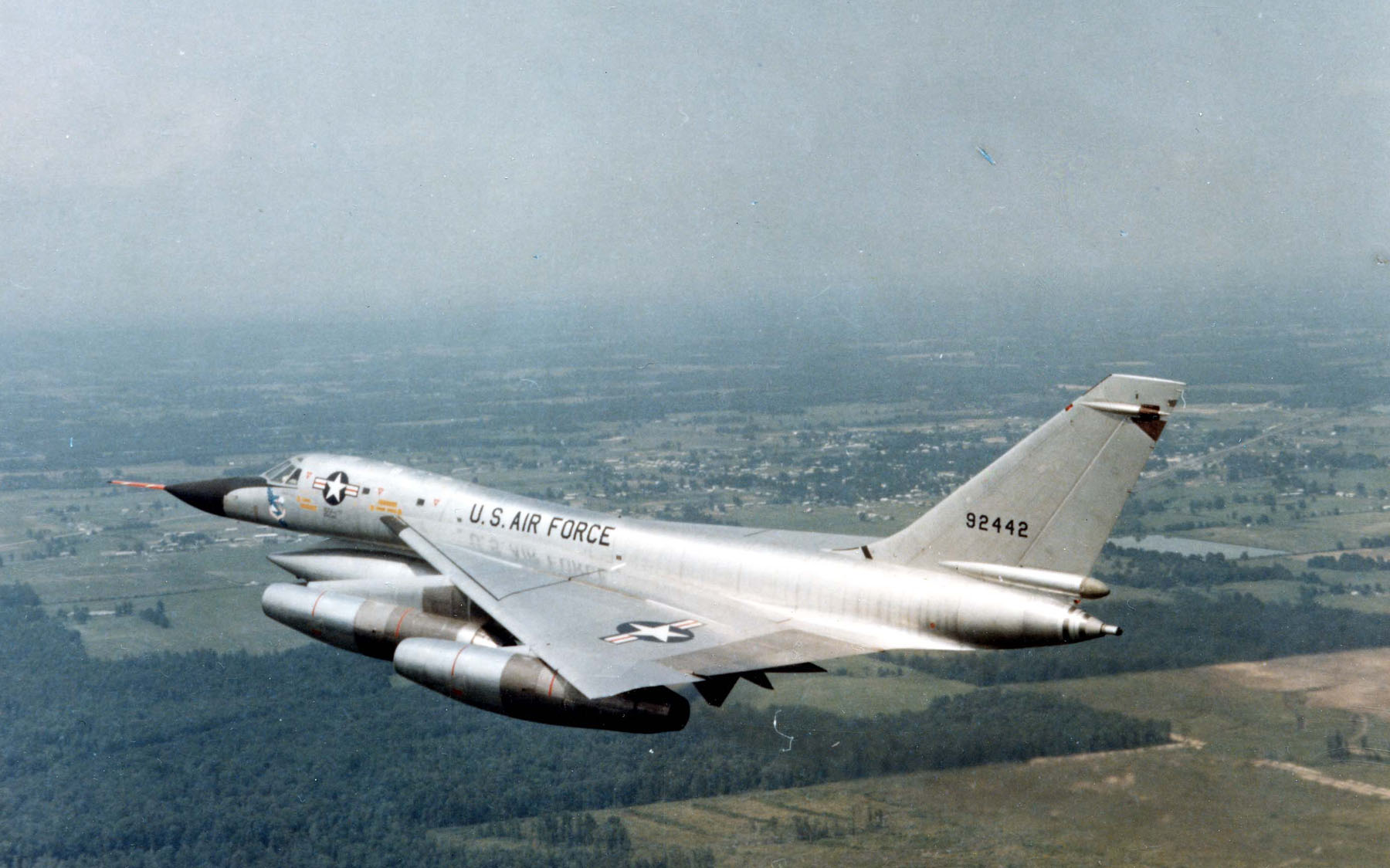
B-58 Hustler in flight (Note: Aircraft is Convair B-58A-CF, serial 59-2442 "Untouchable". It participated in Operation Quick Step and set three world records for class including 2000 km closed course flight averaging 1061.80 mph carrying payload. It became last B-58 to leave Little Rock AFB for the Military Aircraft Storage and Disposition Center. Brewer, Alex P.; Brewer, Randy A. "B-58.com, The B-58 Hustler Page: Inventory". B-58.com.)

The squadron moved to Carswell Air Force Base without personnel or equipment on 15 April 1960, and was not manned or equipped until August. Then it took over personnel and equipment from the 3958th Combat Crew Training Squadron and the 6592d Test Squadron, which were discontinued. The squadron immediately began training crews on the Convair B-58 Hustler. The squadron was equipped with experimental and training models of the Hustler, along with Convair TF-102 Delta Daggers, to perform Category II and III evaluations of the new bomber, along with its training responsibilities. The evaluations of the Hustler ended in 1962.

In 1962, a crew from the 65th won the Mackay Trophy and the Bendix Trophy for setting a trio of transcontinental speed records in a round trip from Los Angeles to New York and back during Operation Heat Rise.

At the beginning of the Cuban Missile Crisis in October 1962, Only six B-58s in the entire SAC inventory were on alert. Even these aircraft were "second cycle" (follow on) sorties. Crew training was suspended, and the squadron, along with SAC's other B-58 squadrons, began placing its bombers on alert> By the first week of November, 84 B-58s were standing nuclear alert. and as SAC redeployed its Boeing KC-135 Stratotankers, 20 of these were "first cycle" sorties. (Note: The availability of KC-135s to refuel the B-58s was the main factor in relegating them to the second cycle of the war plan. KC-135s were primarily dedicated to refueling B-52s. See Kipp et al. p. 30 and following for SAC bomber actions during the Cuban Crisis.) Within a short time, this grew to 41 bombers. By 20 November, SAC resumed its normal alert posture, and half the squadron's aircraft were kept on alert.

In September 1964, the 43d Wing and the squadron moved to Little Rock Air Force Base, Arkansas. In December 1965, Robert S. McNamara, Secretary of Defense announced a phaseout program that would further reduce SAC’s bomber force. This program called for the mid-1971 retirement of all B-58s and some Boeing B-52 Stratofortress models. With the removal of the B-58 from SAC's bomber force, the squadron was inactivated at the end of January 1970.

==== Control of SAC units in the Pacific ====
The squadron was redesignated the 65th Strategic Squadron and activated at Anderson Air Force Base, Guam in July 1986. When Anderson was transferred from SAC to Pacific Air Forces in 1990, the squadron moved to Kadena Air Base, Japan, where it was assigned to the 376th Strategic Wing. Until it was inactivated in October 1991, the squadron controlled Boeing B-52 Stratofortresses and Boeing KC-135 Stratotankers deployed from SAC units in the United States.

=== Air Force Special Operations Command ===
The squadron was redesignated the 65th Special Operations Squadron and activated at Hurlburt Field, Florida in December 2018. It operates General Atomics MQ-9 Reapers that are located at other stations.

== Lineage ==
- Constituted as the 65th Bombardment Squadron (Heavy) on 20 November 1940

Activated on 15 January 1941

- Redesignated 65th Bombardment Squadron, Heavy on 21 September 1943

Inactivated on 29 April 1946

- Redesignated 65th Bombardment Squadron, Very Heavy and activated on 1 October 1946

Redesignated 65th Bombardment Squadron, Medium on 2 July 1948
Inactivated on 31 January 1970

- Redesignated 65th Strategic Squadron on 7 April 1986

Activated on 1 July 1986
Inactivated on 2 October 1991

- Redesignated 65th Special Operations Squadron on 26 September 2018

Activated on 17 December 2018

=== Assignments ===
- 43d Bombardment Group, 15 January 1941 – 29 April 1946
- 43d Bombardment Group, 1 October 1946 (attached to 43d Bombardment Wing after 10 February 1951)
- 43d Bombardment Wing, 16 June 1952 – 31 January 1970
- 43d Strategic Wing (later 43d Bombardment Wing), 1 July 1986
- 376th Strategic Wing, 1 July 1990 – 2 October 1991
- 1st Special Operations Group, 17 December 2018 – present

=== Stations ===
- Langley Field, Virginia, 15 January 1941
- Army Air Base Bangor, Maine, 29 August 1941 – 17 February 1942
- Sydney Airport, New South Wales, Australia, 28 March 1942
- RAAF Base Williamtown, Victoria, Australia, 23 June 1942
- Longreach Airport Torrens Creek, Queensland, Australia, 15 August 1942
- Iron Range Airfield, Queensland, Australia, 13 October 1942
- Mareeba Airfield, Queensland, Australia, 7 November 1942
- Jackson Airfield, Port Moresby, New Guinea, 20 January 1943
- Dobodura Airfield, New Guinea, c. 11 December 1943
- Nadzab Airfield, New Guinea, March 1944
- Owi Airfield, Schouten Islands, Netherlands East Indies, c. 11 July 1944
- Tacloban Airfield, Leyte, Philippines, c. 24 November 1944
- Clark Field, Luzon, Philippines, c. 16 March 1945
- Ie Shima Airfield, Okinawa, c. 24 July 1945
- Fort William McKinley, Luzon, Philippines, 10 December 1945 – 29 April 1946
- Davis-Monthan Field, Arizona, 1 October 1946
- Carswell Air Force Base, Texas, 15 March 1960
- Little Rock Air Force Base, Arkansas, 1 September 1964 – 31 January 1970
- Anderson Air Force Base, Guam, 1 July 1986
- Kadena Air Base, Japan, 11 December 1990 – 2 October 1991
- Hurlburt Field, Florida, 17 December 2018 – present

=== Aircraft ===
- North American B-25 Mitchell, 1941
- Boeing B-17 Flying Fortress, 1941–1943
- Consolidated B-24 Liberator, 1942–1945
- Boeing B-29 Superfortress, 1946–1950
- Boeing B-50 Superfortress, 1948–1954
- Boeing B-47 Stratojet, 1954–1960
- Convair TF-102 Delta Dagger
- Convair B-58 Hustler, 1960–1970
- Boeing B-52 Stratofortress, 1986–1991
- Boeing KC-135 Stratotanker, 1990–1991
- General Atomics MQ-9 Reaper, 2018–present

=== Awards and campaigns ===
Award streamer	Award	Dates	Notes
	Distinguished Unit Citation	2 October 1942 – 23 January 1943	Papua New Guinea 65th Bombardment Squadron
	Distinguished Unit Citation	2-4 March 1943	Bismarck Sea 65th Bombardment Squadron
	Air Force Outstanding Unit Award	1 August 1960 – 1 August 1962	65th Bombardment Squadron
	Air Force Outstanding Unit Award	30 June 1990 – 30 June 1991	65th Strategic Squadron
	Philippine Republic Presidential Unit Citation	17 October 44 – 4 July 45	65th Bombardment Squadron

Campaign Streamer	Campaign	Dates	Notes
	Air Offensive, Japan	17 April 1942 – 2 September 1945	65th Bombardment Squadron
	China Defensive	4 July 1942 – 4 May 1945	65th Bombardment Squadron
	Papua	23 July 1942 – 23 January 1943	65th Bombardment Squadron
	New Guinea	24 January 1943 – 31 December 1944	65th Bombardment Squadron
	Northern Solomons	23 February 1943 – 21 November 1944	65th Bombardment Squadron
	Bismarck Archipelago	15 December 1943 – 27 November 1944	65th Bombardment Squadron
	Leyte	17 October 1944 – 1 July 1945	65th Bombardment Squadron
	Luzon	15 December 1944 – 4 July 1945	65th Bombardment Squadron
	Southern Philippines	27 February 1945 – 4 July 1945	65th Bombardment Squadron
	Western Pacific	17 April 1945 – 2 September 1945	65th Bombardment Squadron
	China Offensive	5 May 1945 – 2 September 1945	65th Bombardment Squadron

== See also ==
- Old 666
- United States Army Air Forces in Australia
- B-17 Flying Fortress units of the United States Army Air Forces
- B-24 Liberator units of the United States Army Air Forces
- List of B-47 units of the United States Air Force
- List of B-52 Units of the United States Air Force
