= William Chatalas =

Turkey-born American politician from Washington

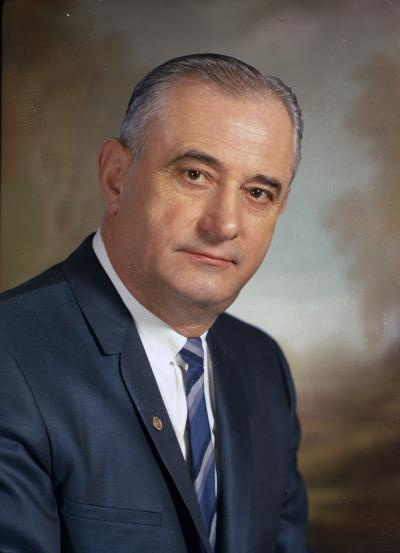
- William Chatalas in 1967

Member of the Washington House of Representatives from the 33rd, 35th district
- In office 1961–1975
- Succeeded by: Eugene V. Lux

Personal details
- Born: June 1, 1907 Istanbul, Turkey
- Died: February 1986 (aged 78) Federal Way, Washington, United States
- Party: Democratic
- Occupation: Politician

William Chatalas (June 1, 1907 – February 1986) was an American politician in the state of Washington. He served in the Washington House of Representatives from 1961 to 1975.
