= 1974 United States Senate election in South Dakota =

- November 5, 1974

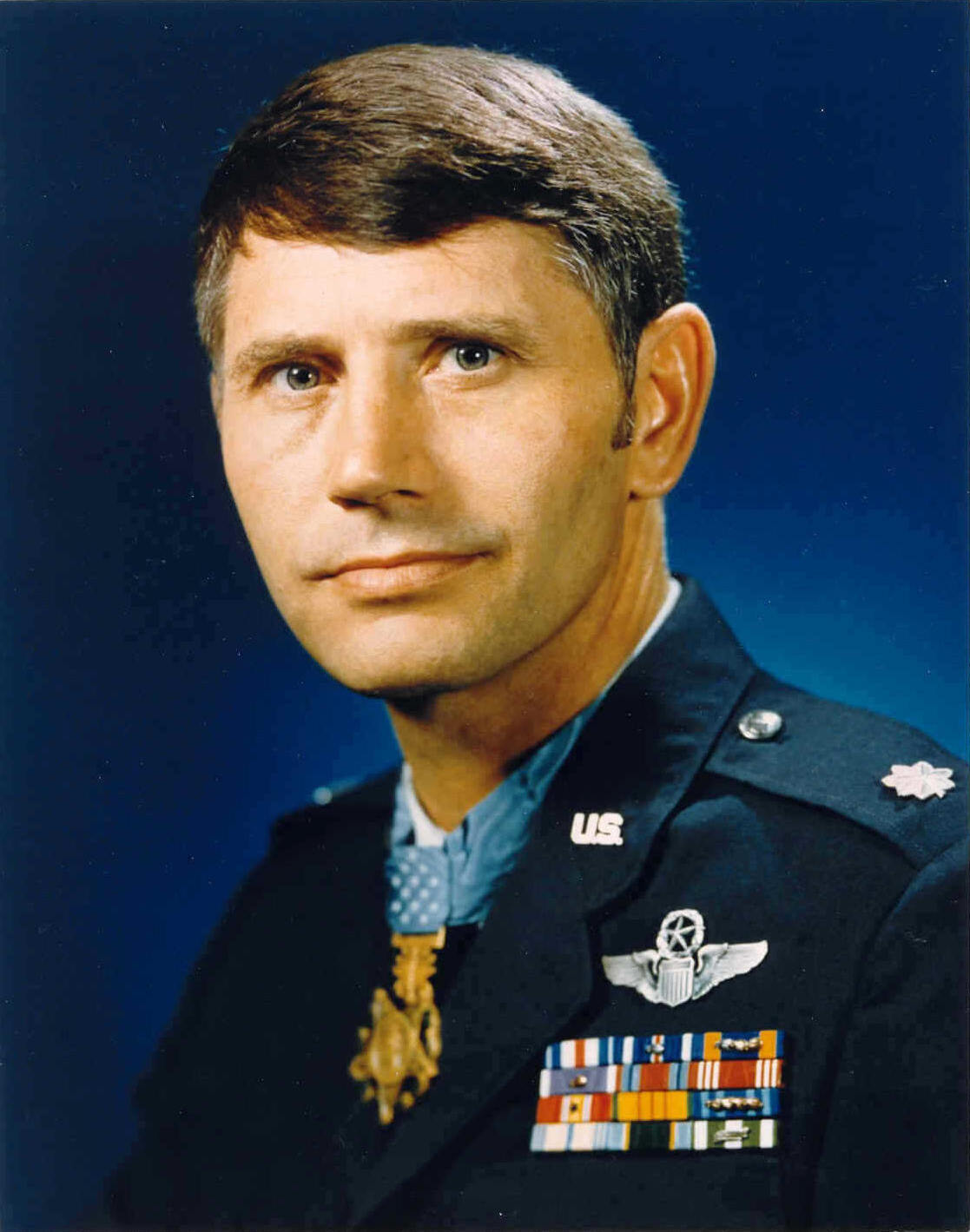
Nominee	George McGovern	Leo K. Thorsness
Party	Democratic	Republican
Popular vote	147,929	130,955
Percentage	53.04%	46.96%
- County results McGovern: 50–60% 60–70% Thorsness: 50–60% 60–70% 70–80%
U.S. senator before election
George McGovern
Democratic
Elected U.S. Senator
George McGovern
Democratic

The 1974 United States Senate election in South Dakota was held on November 5, 1974. Incumbent Democratic U.S. Senator George McGovern ran for reelection to a third term and won.

McGovern's reelection was notable for the fact two years prior, in the 1972 presidential election, McGovern lost his home state by 9 points to Richard Nixon, yet won his Senate reelection bid by 6 points, marking a fifteen-point swing in two years.

== Primary elections ==
Primary elections were held on June 4, 1974.

=== Democratic primary ===
==== Candidates ====
- George McGovern, incumbent U.S. senator

==== Results ====
Democratic primary results
Party	Candidate	Votes	%
Democratic	George McGovern (incumbent)	unopposed	

=== Republican primary ===
==== Candidates ====
- Barbara B. Gunderson, former Republican national committeewoman, former civil service commissioner
- Al Schock
- Leo K. Thorsness, former United States Air Force colonel and prisoner of war

==== Results ====
Republican primary results
Party	Candidate	Votes	%
Republican	Leo K. Thorsness	49,716	52.35%
Republican	Al Schock	35,406	37.28%
Republican	Barbara B. Gunderson	9,852	10.37%
Total votes		94,974	100.00%

== General election ==
=== Candidates ===
- George McGovern (D), incumbent U.S. senator
- Leo K. Thorsness (R)

=== Results ===
1974 United States Senate election in South Dakota
Party	Candidate	Votes	%
Democratic	George McGovern (incumbent)	147,929	53.04
Republican	Leo K. Thorsness	130,955	46.96
Majority		16,974	6.08
Turnout		278,884	
Democratic hold			

== See also ==
- 1974 United States Senate elections

== Bibliography ==
- Congressional Elections, 1946-1996. Washington, D.C.: Congressional Quarterly Inc. 1998. ISBN 1-56802-248-4.
- Scammon, Richard M., ed. (1975). America Votes 11: a handbook of contemporary American election statistics, 1974. Washington, D.C.: Elections Research Center.
