= Jay Zeamer Jr. =

U.S. Army Air Forces pilot (1918–2007)

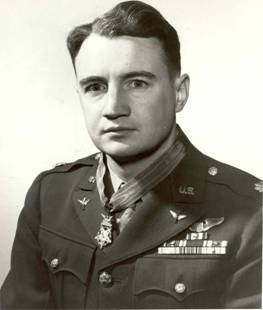
- Lt. Col. Jay Zeamer Jr.
- Born: July 25, 1918; Carlisle, Pennsylvania, US
- Died: March 22, 2007 (aged 88); Boothbay Harbor, Maine, US
- Burial place: Arlington National Cemetery
- Military career
- Allegiance: United States
- Branch: United States Army Air Forces
- Service years: 1939–1945
- Rank: Lieutenant Colonel
- Units: 65th Bomb Squadron, 43rd Bomb Group; Fifth Air Force
- Conflicts: World War II
- Awards: Medal of Honor; Silver Star (2); Distinguished Flying Cross (2); Purple Heart; Air Medal (2)

Jay Zeamer Jr. (July 25, 1918 – March 22, 2007) was a pilot of the United States Army Air Forces in the South Pacific during World War II, who received the Medal of Honor for valor during a B-17 Flying Fortress mission on June 16, 1943. After the war, he became an aeronautical engineer and worked in the aerospace industry.

== Early life ==
Born in Carlisle, Pennsylvania, Zeamer grew up in Orange, New Jersey, the son of a women's club leader and sales representative for (and later vice-president of) a global leather exporter. He spent many summers at Boothbay Harbor, Maine, where he enjoyed rowing a homemade boat in the harbor.

Zeamer became an Eagle Scout at the age of fourteen. (He is one of only twelve known Eagle Scouts who also received the Medal of Honor. The others are Aquilla J. Dyess, Robert Edward Femoyer, Eugene B. Fluckey, Walter Joseph Marm Jr., Thomas R. Norris, Arlo L. Olson, Mitchell Paige, Benjamin L. Salomon, Leo K. Thorsness, and Royce Williams.) After a freshman year of high school in Orange, he was enrolled by his father in Culver Military Academy in Culver, Indiana, where he completed the Senior Infantry Reserve Officers Training Corps course. Winning honors in marksmanship each year he was there, he served in the Culver Rifles Color Guard his last two years. After completing ROTC Advanced Camp, he was given a certificate in lieu of a commission in the Infantry Officer Reserves Corps for which he could apply upon his twenty-first birthday.

He attended a year of junior college at Culver after graduation, taking on a more rigorous curriculum and attending summer school, allowing him to enter the Massachusetts Institute of Technology (M.I.T.) as a second-year student. In August 1939, after turning twenty-one in July, he received his infantry commission, becoming a second lieutenant in the Army Reserve, assigned to the 312th Infantry, 78th Division.,

Interested in aviation since childhood, in 1938 Zeamer had joined the M.I.T. flying club based in nearby Norwood. Within a year he was licensed himself with a hundred solo hours in his logbook; he also served as manager of the club. In October 1939, Zeamer applied for the Army Air Corps flight training program and was accepted in December. His entrance to the program was deferred until after his graduation from M.I.T. in June 1940 with a B.S. in civil engineering, specializing in structural engineering. Zeamer began elementary flight school training as a flying cadet in the Chicago School of Aeronautics, Glenview, Illinois, where his leadership skills earned him the position of Captain of Cadets of Class 41-B.

== Military service ==
=== USAAC ===
In March 1941, he received his wings and a commission in the U.S. Army Air Corps after graduating from basic and advanced flight school at Maxwell Field, Alabama. Initially assigned to the 96th Bombardment Squadron of the 2nd Bombardment Group as assistant engineering officer, Zeamer was transferred to the 63rd Bombardment Squadron, 43rd Bombardment Group, where he served as squadron executive officer. It was there that he first met his future bombardier, Joseph Sarnoski. Sometime during the summer, Zeamer and "all the rest of the second lieutenants" were sent to Patterson Field in Dayton, Ohio, for assisting with the service testing of the new Martin B-26 Marauder by the 22nd Bombardment Group. Following his return to Langley Field, Zeamer was assigned to the group's 19th Bombardment Squadron as a co-pilot. On December 8, 1941, the 22nd was transferred from Langley to California to fly anti-submarine patrols and reconnaissance off the west coast of the United States. In March 1942, the 22nd BG was deployed to Australia, where Zeamer flew his first combat mission as a B-26 co-pilot on April 6, 1942. He was promoted to first lieutenant that same month. Still, due to issues of reaction time and aggressiveness on the controls, Zeamer had never checked out as first pilot in the B-26.

With the arrival of his old group, the 43rd, in Australia flying the new "F" model Boeing B-17 Flying Fortress in August 1942, Zeamer sought and obtained a transfer from the 22nd to the 43rd. He reported for duty with the 403rd Bombardment Squadron in Torrens Creek, Australia, on September 22, reuniting with his gunnery trainer and friend from the previous summer, Joe Sarnoski. Lacking any experience in the B-17, Zeamer had to scrounge for flights at first as a self-described "squadron errand boy" before gaining combat experience in October as a substitute copilot and even navigator. Despite having not yet been checked out as first pilot in the B-17, Zeamer flew his first mission as pilot-in-command on November 20, a photo reconnaissance of Simpson Harbor at Rabaul, New Britain. He was awarded the Silver Star for the mission, which also served as his transition to first pilot.

Around the end of 1942, Zeamer began putting together his own crew, beginning with Sarnoski and squadron navigator Charles "Rocky" Stone. Popular accounts of the crew and its formation refer to them as "screw-offs," "renegades," and "misfits," but are not borne out by the actual record and are either fiction or gross exaggeration. In time, they began calling themselves "The Eager Beavers" for Zeamer's constant volunteering for missions as they became available. An early incarnation of the crew was awarded Air Medals for the sinking of a merchant vessel at Rabaul on January 17, 1943. The bombing of Milne Bay that same day, as well as significant personnel losses to malaria and dengue fever, led to the 403rd being returned to Australia soon after for recuperation. Almost two months of non-combat followed, prompting another transfer for Zeamer, this time into the 65th Bomb Squadron of the 43rd BG, based in Port Moresby, New Guinea, in late March 1943. He was promoted to captain in early April, as well as made squadron operations officer. On April 12, the Eager Beavers flew a mission to Rabaul for which he was awarded an Oak Leaf Cluster to his Silver Star.

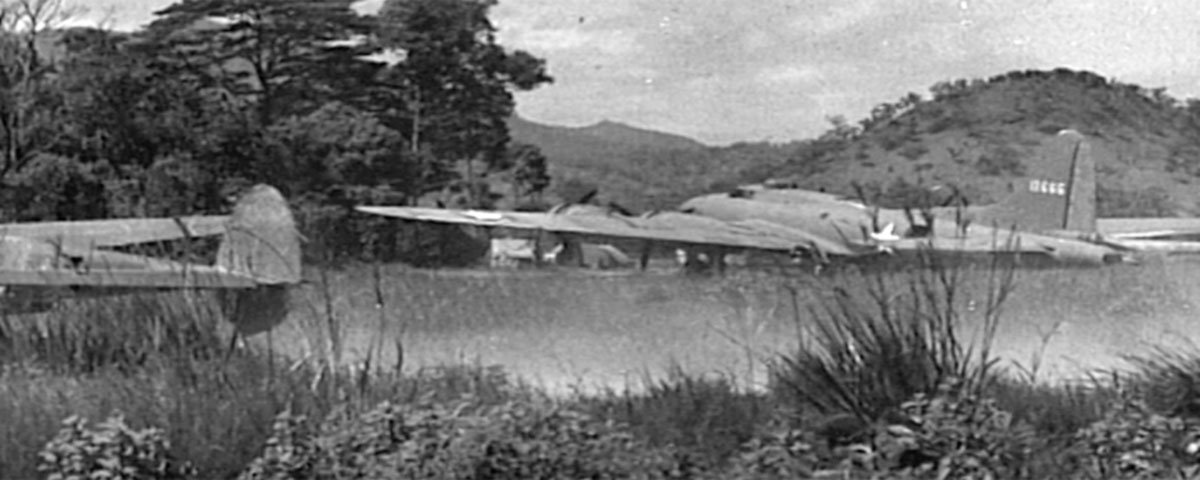
"Old 666"

In May 1943, Zeamer was made squadron executive officer, and took on the upgrading of a B-17E, #41-2666, recently acquired from the 8th Photographic Reconnaissance Squadron, for photographic mapping purposes. The plane was one of the few in the theater equipped with the trimetrogon camera system, which allowed the creation of photographic mosaics for generating accurate ground maps. The aircrew replaced the aircraft's aging engines with new, stripped the bomber of much of its extra weight, and added additional heavy machine guns, including dual .50 caliber M2 Brownings in both the radio compartment and waist gun positions, three in the nose, including a fixed .50 caliber in the plexiglas combing that Zeamer could directly fire from his pilot's control yoke. Contemporary accounts, including the 65th Bomb Squadron's morning report for that day, as well as Zeamer's own flight log, record the aircraft being equipped with 16 active .50 caliber machine guns, with three additional spares stored in the B-17's catwalk for quick combat-related substitution, if and when needed. Now transformed into a gunship, the B-17 was known to its aircrew as "666," or popularly as "Old 666".

=== Medal of Honor ===
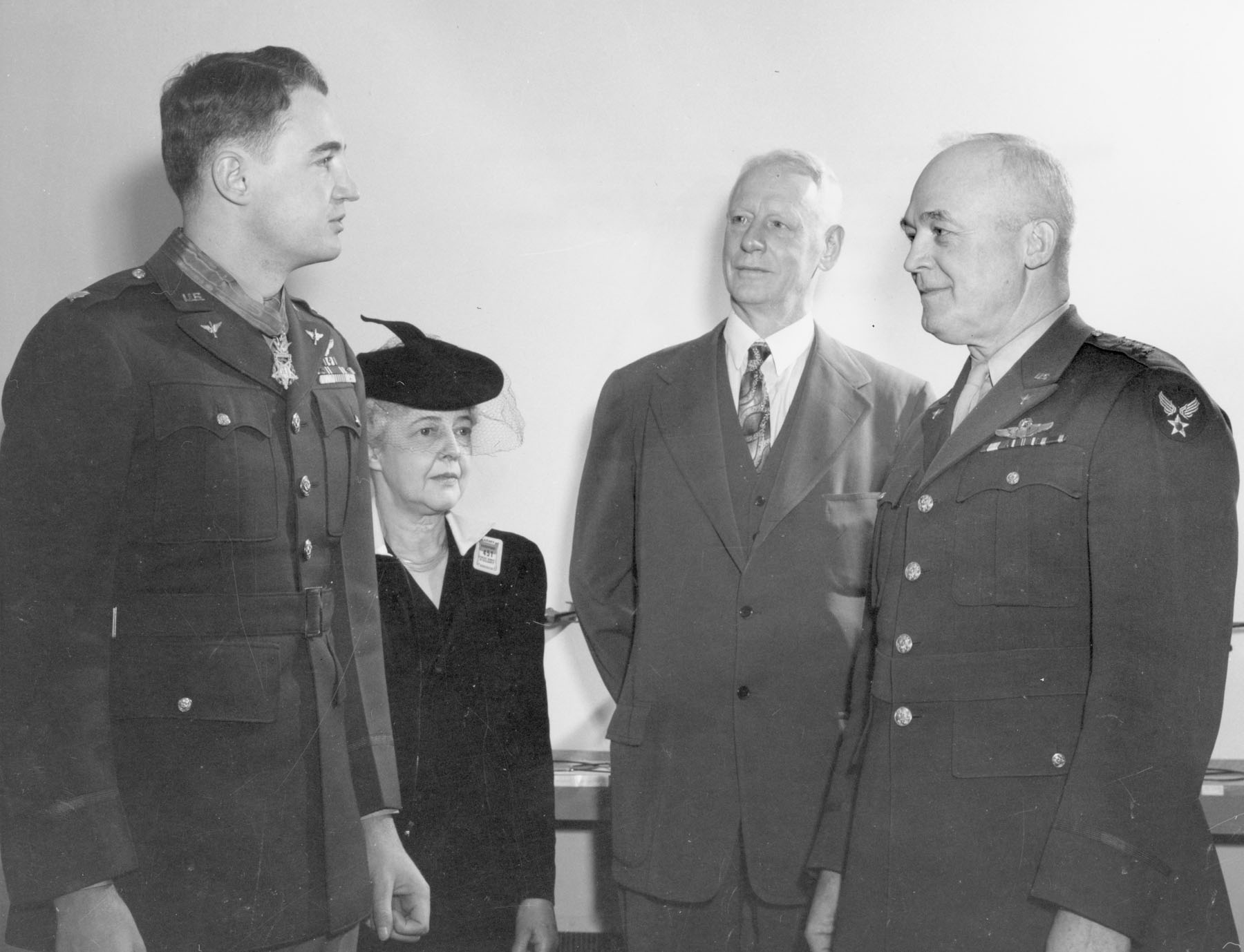
Gen. "Hap" Arnold presents Jay Zeamer Jr. with the Medal of Honor as parents Jay and Margery Zeamer look on (1944)

In April 1943, Zeamer and the crew had been approached about a solo, 1,200-mile (1,900 km) round-trip photo-mapping mission of the western coast of Bougainville, with emphasis on Empress Augusta Bay where any marine landings would be made. Such maps were considered vital to a future invasion of the island in support of coalescing plans for the reduction of Rabaul. It was presented as a volunteer mission because extended mapping runs would require straight and level flight runs of up to 22 minutes deep through hostile territory.

The necessary weather for such a run proved elusive for two months, until mid-June. When the 8th PRS was unable to get the necessary photos on June 15, Zeamer was contacted again. At 04:00 the next morning, 16 June 1943, after intense preparations in the days before, the crew headed for Bougainville. Twice already, once the night before and once as the aircraft was taxiing for take-off, they were ordered by V Bomber Command to do a photo recon of the Japanese airstrip on Buka, a small island off the northern tip of Bougainville. Zeamer rejected the idea both times as too dangerous, almost guaranteeing interception by enemy fighters while in sustained level flight for the mapping operation.

Arriving too early at Bougainville to start the aerial mapping, Zeamer put the question to his aircrew of whether to pass the time flying over the ocean or perform the Buka recon. After they voted for the recon, Zeamer flew northeast in a loop to come back over Buka on their way into the mapping run. Photos taken that day reportedly showed twenty-one Japanese fighters taxiing or taking off to intercept. With approximately a minute left in the mapping run, "Old 666" faced a coordinated attack by eight A6M3 Model 22 Zero fighters from 251 Kōkūtai, as well as an unidentified twin-engined fighter. The ensuing attack mortally wounded bombardier Sarnoski, who struggled back to his machine gun to drive off a second Zero after being blown back from his position by a 20 mm cannon shell from the first Zero. A total of four 20 mm shells destroyed the pilot's side of the instrument panel and broke Zeamer's left leg above and below the knee, leaving a large hole in his left thigh. He was also hit by shrapnel in both arms and his right leg, with a gash in his right wrist. Three others were also wounded, including the navigator and top turret gunner, who responded to a resulting oxygen fire by putting it out with rags and their bare hands.

Due to the loss of oxygen and to escape their attackers, Zeamer dived the B-17 violently from 25,000 feet (7,600 m) to approximately 10,000 feet (3,000 m), estimating the altitude by an increase in engine manifold pressure. The Japanese followed them down and commenced a forty-minute series of attack passes at the nose of the B-17. Despite his wounds, Zeamer avoided any further extensive damage to the plane by repeatedly turning into the oncoming fighters, just inside the trajectory of their fixed fire, a technique he learned while in the 22nd BG. By doing so, the Zeros would continue rolling into the bomber without hitting it, but exposing themselves to the B-17's rear machine guns. Eventually, all of the Zeros broke off the attack due either to damage, lack of ammunition, or lack of fuel.

After the engagement, an assessment revealed that the B-17's oxygen and hydraulic systems were destroyed, as well as all of the pilot's flight instruments. The magnetic compass and engine instruments on the co-pilot's side were undamaged, as were all four engines. Too wounded to move and unwilling to give up command of his aircraft, Zeamer advised the top turret gunner after he took over co-piloting duties, allowing the unwounded co-pilot to attend to the wounded. The lack of oxygen, in addition to Zeamer's and the navigator's injuries, meant a return to Port Moresby over the Owen Stanley Mountains was impossible. Instead, they made an emergency landing at an Allied fighter airstrip at Dobodura, New Guinea. Without operable brakes or flaps because of the destroyed hydraulic system, the B-17 was ground-looped, without additional damage, by the co-pilot. The casualties were one killed (Sarnoski) and four wounded. Zeamer was initially thought dead from loss of blood, but he was treated with the other injured aircrew members by the 10th Field Ambulance of the Royal Australian Army Medical Corps before being transported back to Port Moresby the next day.

Colonel Merian C. Cooper, chief of staff to the deputy commander of the Fifth Air Force, Major General Ennis Whitehead, recommended Zeamer be awarded the Medal of Honor, to which Fifth Air Force commander General George Kenney concurred. Zeamer received the award from Chief of the Army Air Forces General Henry H. Arnold on January 16, 1944, at the Pentagon.

Sarnoski was also awarded the Medal of Honor, marking only the third time in U.S. history that two members of the same crew received the Medal of Honor for a single mission. (In World War I, Erwin R. Bleckley and Harold Ernest Goettler were posthumously honored for their efforts to resupply the "Lost Battalion", while Addison Baker and John L. Jerstad received the award just two months after Zeamer's Medal of Honor action during the Allied raids on oil refineries in Ploieşti, Romania. In addition, World War I pilot Ralph Talbot and his observer, Robert G. Robinson, were awarded the Medal of Honor for two missions they undertook together.) All other members of Zeamer's aircrew received the Distinguished Service Cross. This remains the most highly decorated single air mission, and Zeamer's aircrew the most highly decorated in American history.

=== Promotions and discharge ===
Zeamer was promoted to major on July 8, 1943, and lieutenant colonel in April 1944. He spent 15 months in recovery, regaining most of the use of his left leg, and returned to active duty at Mitchel Field, New York as a Tactical Field Air Inspector. On January 18, 1945, Zeamer retired from the USAAF on disability.

== Later life ==
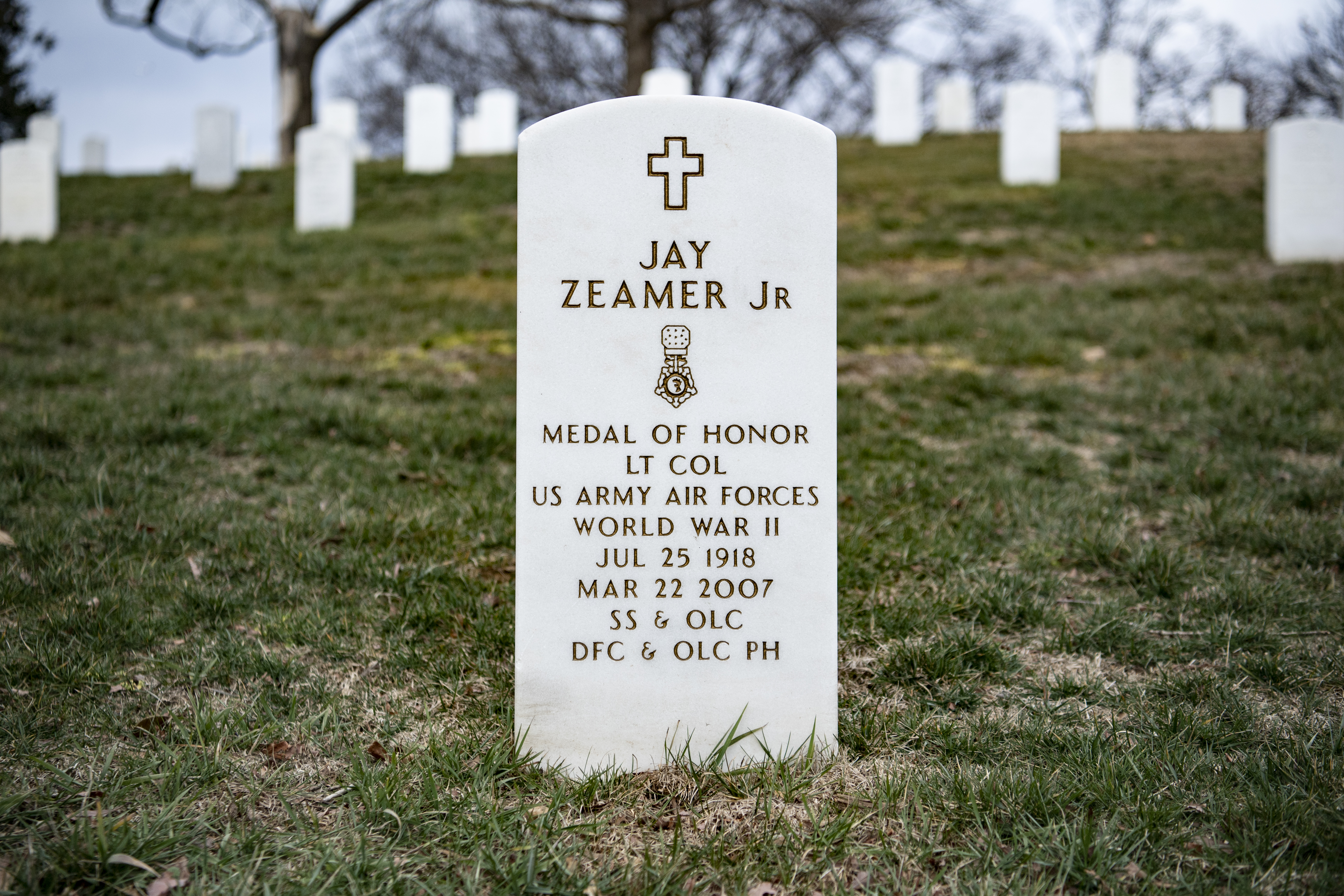
Grave at Arlington National Cemetery

He returned to MIT and obtained a master's degree in aeronautical engineering in 1946. Zeamer then worked for a series of aerospace companies: Pratt & Whitney in East Hartford, Connecticut, followed by Hughes Aircraft in Los Angeles, California, and finally Raytheon in Bedford, Massachusetts. Zeamer moved to Boothbay Harbor, Maine, in 1968, where he enjoyed rowing in the harbor, as he had done in his childhood. He retired in 1975.

Zeamer married in 1949, and with his wife Barbara raised five daughters: Marcia, Jacque, Jayne, Susan, and Sandra. Barbara Zeamer stated that he rarely talked about his wartime experiences or the medal. "I think he didn't feel he deserved it. He was so close to his bombardier [Sarnoski] and he felt terrible about his being killed".

Zeamer died in a nursing home at age 88. At the time of his death, he was the last living Medal of Honor recipient of the U.S. Army Air Forces. Zeamer's funeral was held on May 11, 2007, and he was buried at Arlington National Cemetery, in Arlington, Virginia. The governor of Maine, John Baldacci, ordered that flags in the state be flown at half-staff on the day of the funeral.

== Awards and decorations ==

Army Air Forces Pilot Badge
Medal of Honor	Silver Star with bronze oak leaf cluster	Distinguished Flying Cross with bronze oak leaf cluster
Purple Heart	Air Medal with bronze oak leaf cluster	American Defense Service Medal
American Campaign Medal with service star	Asiatic-Pacific Campaign Medal with silver campaign star	World War II Victory Medal

Army Presidential Unit Citation

=== Medal of Honor citation ===
Zeamer's Medal of Honor citation reads:

Rank and organization: Major, U.S. Army Air Corps. Place and date: Over Buka area, Solomon Islands, June 16, 1943. Entered service at: Machias, Maine. Birth: Carlisle, Pa. G.O. No.: 1, January 4, 1944.

Citation:

On 16 June 1943, Major Zeamer (then Captain) volunteered as pilot of a bomber on a very important photographic mapping mission covering the formidably defended area in the vicinity of Buka, Solomon Islands. While photographing the Buka airdrome, his aircrew observed about 20 enemy fighters on the field, many of them taking off. Despite the certainty of a dangerous attack by this strong force, Major Zeamer proceeded with his mapping run, even after the enemy attack began. In the ensuing engagement, Major Zeamer sustained canon and machine gun wounds in both arms and legs, one leg being broken. Despite his injuries, he maneuvered the damaged B-17 so skillfully that his gunners were able to fight off the enemy during a running fight which lasted 40 minutes. The aircrew destroyed at least 5 Japanese aircraft, of which Major Zeamer himself shot down one. Although very weak from loss of blood, he refused medical aid until the enemy had broken combat. He then turned over his controls, but continued to exercise command despite lapses into unconsciousness, and directed the flight to a base 580 miles away. In this voluntary action, Major Zeamer, with superb skill, resolution, and courage, accomplished a mission of great value to the Army Air Force.

== Legacy ==
Zeamer's Medal of Honor mission was featured on The History Channel and in Martin Caidin's article "Mission Over Buka," published in the February 1956 edition of Argosy magazine. Caidin adapted the article for the first chapter of his 1968 book Flying Forts: The B-17 in WWII.

There is a "Lt. Col. Jay Zeamer Squadron" in the Arnold Air Society under MIT's AFROTC program.

The 43d Airlift Wing's headquarters building on Pope Air Force Base was named in Zeamer's honor in October 2008. Since 2011, the building has been the headquarters of the 43d Airlift Group.

In 2011, Zeamer was selected as the class exemplar of the Class of 2014 at the United States Air Force Academy. His name is now worn on the left sleeve of that class's athletic jacket uniforms.

== See also ==
- List of Medal of Honor recipients
