= Joseph Sarnoski =

U.S. Army Air aviator (1915–1943)

Joseph R. Sarnoski
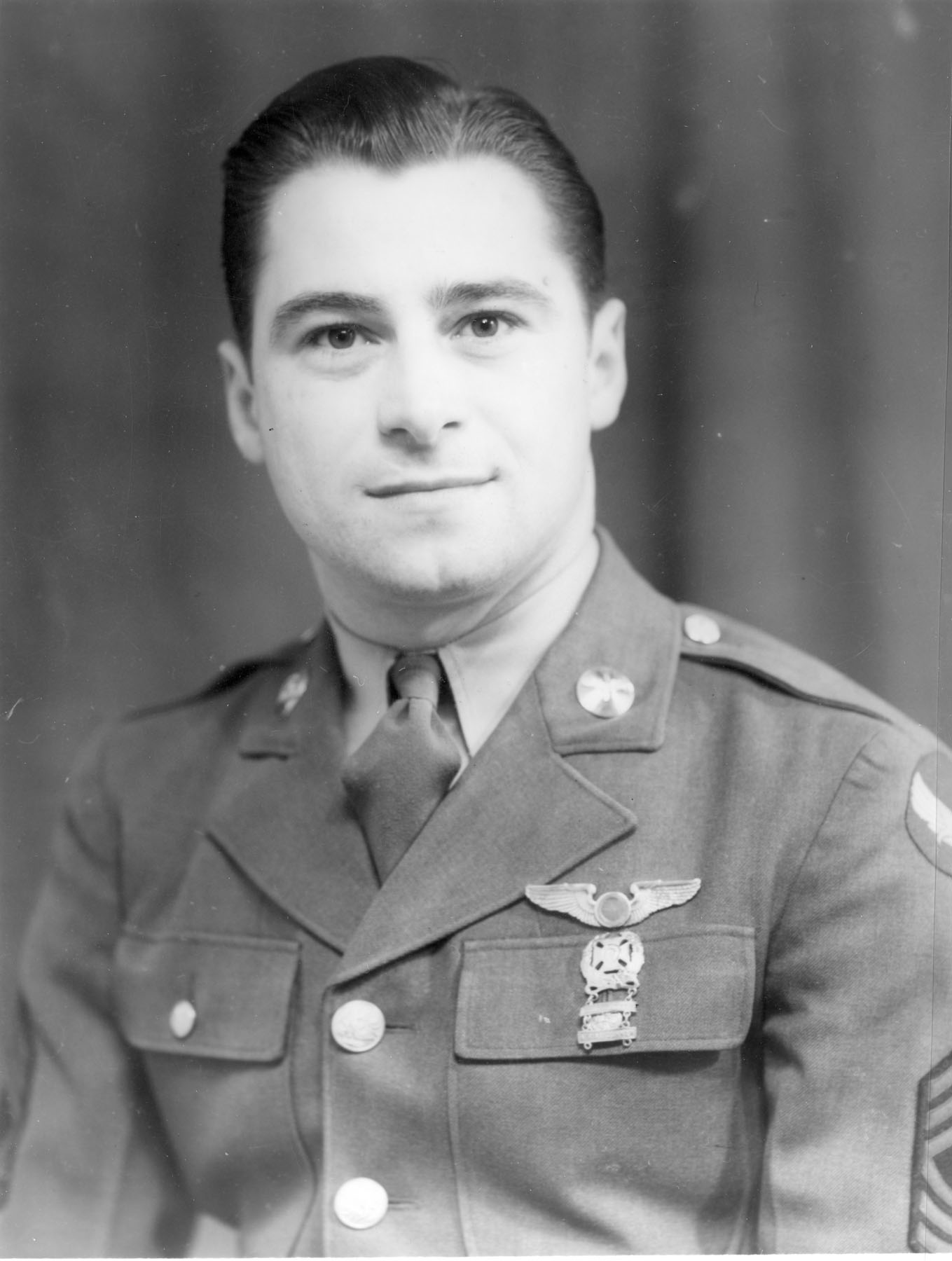
- Born: January 31, 1915; Simpson, Pennsylvania, US
- Died: June 16, 1943 (aged 28); Bougainville, Solomon Islands
- Burial place: National Cemetery of the Pacific
- Military career
- Allegiance: United States
- Branch: United States Army: United States Army Air Corps; United States Army Air Forces
- Service years: 1936–1943
- Rank: Second lieutenant
- Units: 65th Bomb Sqdn, 43rd Bomb Grp; Fifth Air Force
- Conflicts: World War II: Pacific War †
- Awards: Medal of Honor; Silver Star; Air Medal; Purple Heart

Joseph Raymond Sarnoski (January 31, 1915 – June 16, 1943) was an officer of the United States Army Air Forces during World War II, and received the Medal of Honor posthumously.

Sarnoski was part of the flight crew of Capt. Jay Zeamer Jr. on Old 666 on the day where both he and Zeamer earned the Medal of Honor.

== Life and career ==
=== Childhood ===
Sarnoski was the second-oldest in a family of seventeen children belonging to a Polish coal miner in Simpson, Pennsylvania, just north of Carbondale. His father's health began to fail and he left the coal mines to begin farming where Joseph Sarnoski worked hard to help keep the farm operating and make ends meet. The family later moved to nearby White's Crossing, where Sarnoski graduated from high school. Though the responsibility of alternating between education and farm work left little free time, Sarnoski developed an interest in aviation.

=== Military career ===
On March 7, 1936, Sarnoski enlisted in the United States Army as an air cadet, entering service in Baltimore, Maryland. After basic training he was assigned to the 2nd Bomb Group at Langley Field, Virginia, with additional training at Lowry Field, Colorado, where he completed the Advanced Aircraft Armorer's Course in 1939.

In 1940, he was discharged from the Regular Army to reenlist in the Air Corps in order to train as an air crewman, completing the Bombsight Maintenance Course. Sarnoski was promoted to Sergeant, made an enlisted bombardier in B-17 Flying Fortress bombers, and returned to Langley as part of the 41st Reconnaissance Squadron, attached to the 2nd Bomb Group.

While stationed at Langley Sarnoski met and married his wife, Marie, and was promoted to Staff Sergeant early in 1941. In September 1941 Sarnoski was transferred to Dow Field, Bangor, Maine, as a bombing instructor with the 65th Bombardment Squadron, 43rd Bomb Group, newly equipped with B-17s. With the entry of the United States into World War II, Sarnoski's group was transferred to Australia on January 13, 1942, where in March he was promoted to technical sergeant. Sarnoski continued to act primarily as an instructor but did fly some combat missions and earn promotion to Master Sergeant. In November 1942, now based at Port Moresby, New Guinea, he volunteered to become part of a combat crew put together by 1st Lt. Jay Zeamer Jr.

Sarnoski was awarded the Silver Star in combat and by recommendation of his pilot received a battlefield commission to second lieutenant on May 24, 1943.

== Medal of Honor mission ==
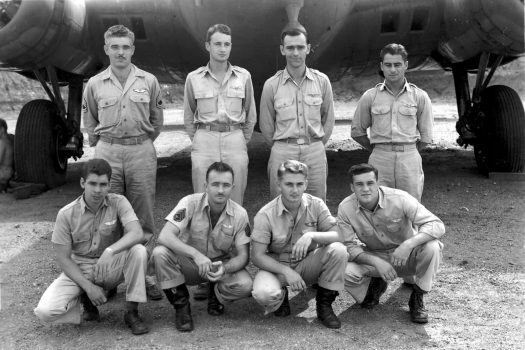
The crew of Old 666. In the back row are Sarnoski (far right) and Zeamer (second from left). Not all crew in this photo were on the 16 June 1943 mission.

On June 16, 1943, Sarnoski, normally a bombardier, volunteered to fly as one of the crew of B-17E, AAF Ser. No. 41-2666, Old 666 on an unescorted mission to Buka, a small island off the north coast of Bougainville, a 1200-mile round-trip mission, to photograph Japanese installations and map the west coast of Bougainville as far south as Empress Augusta Bay in preparation for Allied landings scheduled for early November 1943 in World War II. Apparently unbeknownst to Allied intelligence, the Japanese had moved about 400 fighters into the Solomon Islands on June 15.

The photo reconnaissance mission was without incident, although the B-17's crew reported observing 20 fighters taking off from Buka airfield. The bomber continued south to the mapping run and shortly before its completion, the B-17 was intercepted by five Japanese fighters attacking from the front. Though wounded in the attack, Sarnoski continued to fire his nose gun, shooting down two fighters. A 20-millimeter cannon shell exploded in the nose compartment of the B-17, severely wounding Sarnoski and knocking him completely out of the compartment. Sarnoski dragged himself back to his station and continued to fire until he died at his position.

The B-17 eventually landed successfully in New Guinea after Sarnoski died. Jay Zeamer Jr. was also awarded the Medal of Honor, the only instance of World War II when two members of one crew were honored for separate acts of heroism in the same combat engagement.

This mission has been recreated by The History Channel as part of Episode 12 of its series Dogfights, "Long Odds", first telecast January 19, 2007.

== Burial and remembrances ==
On January 6, 1949, two days after the first interment at the new cemetery, Sarnoski's body was returned from its burial location on New Guinea and interred in Section A, Grave 582 of the National Cemetery of the Pacific at Honolulu, Hawaii.

Merli-Sarnoski State Park, located in Fell Township (just outside of Carbondale), Pennsylvania, was co-named for Joseph Sarnoski and Gino J. Merli in 2002; both were World War II Medal of Honor recipients and Lackawanna County residents.

A street on the Basic Military Training side of Lackland AFB, Texas, has also been named for 2nd Lt Sarnoski.

A military parade field alongside the 43d Airlift Group's headquarters on Pope Field, part of Fort Bragg, North Carolina, was named in 2nd Lt Sarnoski's honor in 2008. In 2012, a parking lot was built over a majority of the field.

== Medal of Honor citation ==
The President of the United States in the name of The Congress takes pleasure in presenting the Medal of Honor to

SARNOSKI, JOSEPH R. (Air Mission)

Rank and Organization: Second Lieutenant, U.S. Army Air Corps, 43rd Bombardment Group, Place and Date: Over Buka Area, Solomon Islands, June 16, 1943. Entered Service at: Simpson, Pa. Born. January 30, 1915, Simpson, Pa. G.O. No.: 85, December 17, 1943.

Citation:

For conspicuous gallantry and intrepidity in action above and beyond the call of duty. On 16 June 1943, 2d Lt. Sarnoski volunteered as bombardier of a crew on an important photographic mapping mission covering the heavily defended Buka area, Solomon Islands. When the mission was nearly completed, about 20 enemy fighters intercepted. At the nose guns, 2d Lt. Sarnoski fought off the first attackers, making it possible for the pilot to finish the plotted course. When a coordinated frontal attack by the enemy extensively damaged his bomber, and seriously injured 5 of the crew, 2d Lt. Sarnoski, though wounded, continued firing and shot down 2 enemy planes. A 20-millimeter shell which burst in the nose of the bomber knocked him into the catwalk under the cockpit. With indomitable fighting spirit, he crawled back to his post and kept on firing until he collapsed on his guns. 2d Lt. Sarnoski by resolute defense of his aircraft at the price of his life, made possible the completion of a vitally important mission.

== Awards and Decorations ==
His decorations include:

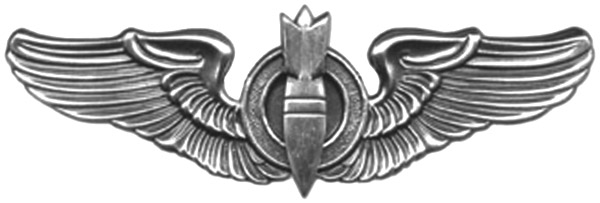

Badge	USAAF Bombardier Badge		
1st row	Medal of Honor	Silver Star	Purple Heart
2nd row	Air Medal	Army Good Conduct Medal	American Defense Service Medal
3rd row	American Campaign Medal with 1 Campaign star	Asiatic-Pacific Campaign Medal with 5 Campaign stars	World War II Victory Medal
Unit awards	Presidential Unit Citation		

== See also ==
- List of Medal of Honor recipients for World War II
