= Leo K. Thorsness =

US Air Force officer and Medal of Honor recipient

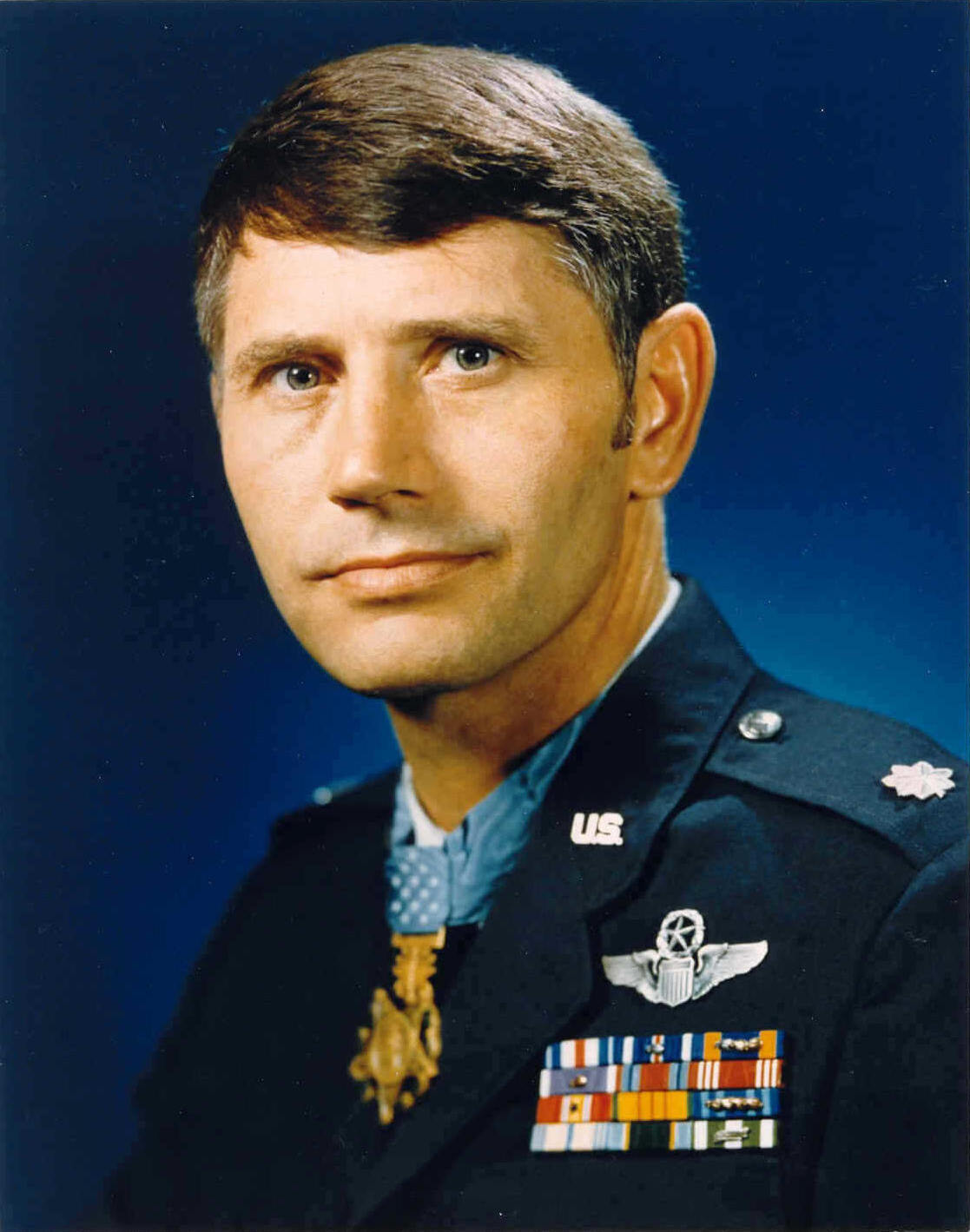
- Medal of Honor recipient Colonel Leo K. Thorsness

Member of the Washington Senate from the 11th district
- In office January 9, 1989 – January 11, 1993
- Preceded by: Eugene V. Lux
- Succeeded by: Margarita Prentice

Personal details
- Born: February 14, 1932 Walnut Grove, Minnesota, U.S.
- Died: May 2, 2017 (aged 85) St. Augustine, Florida, U.S.
- Resting place: Arlington National Cemetery
- Party: Republican
- Education: South Dakota State College; University of Omaha; University of Southern California

Military service
- Allegiance: United States
- Branch/service: United States Air Force
- Years of service: 1951–1973
- Rank: Colonel
- Unit: 357th Tactical Fighter Squadron, 355th Tactical Fighter Wing
- Battles/wars: Vietnam War
- Awards: Medal of Honor; Silver Star (2); Legion of Merit; Distinguished Flying Cross (6); Bronze Star Medal (2); Purple Heart (2); Air Medal (10)

Leo Keith Thorsness (February 14, 1932 – May 2, 2017) was a colonel in the United States Air Force who received the Medal of Honor for his actions in the Vietnam War. He was awarded the medal for an air engagement on April 19, 1967. He was shot down two weeks later and spent almost six years in captivity in North Vietnam as a prisoner of war. After his military service, Thorsness served one term in the Washington State Senate.

== Early life, education, and early career ==
Thorsness was born February 14, 1932, in Walnut Grove, Minnesota, where his family had a farm. There, he earned the Eagle Scout award from the Boy Scouts of America. He is one of only eleven known Eagle Scouts who also received the Medal of Honor. The others are Aquilla J. Dyess and Mitchell Paige of the U.S. Marine Corps; Robert Edward Femoyer and Jay Zeamer Jr. of the U.S. Army Air Forces; Arlo L. Olson, Benjamin L. Salomon, and Walter Joseph Marm Jr. of the United States Army; and Britt K. Slabinski, Eugene B. Fluckey and Thomas R. Norris of the United States Navy. In 2010, Thorsness received the Distinguished Eagle Scout Award.

Thorsness attended South Dakota State College in Brookings, South Dakota, where he met his future wife, Gaylee Anderson, also a freshman. They married in 1953 and had a daughter, Dawn.

Thorsness enlisted in the United States Air Force in 1951 at the age of 19 because his brother was then serving in the Korean War. In 1954, he received his commission as an officer and his wings with a rating of pilot through the USAF Aviation Cadet program in Class 54-G. He later earned a bachelor's degree from the University of Omaha in 1964, and a master's degree in Defense Systems Management from the University of Southern California. His initial assignment was as a pilot in the Strategic Air Command and Tactical Air Command, but he completed training as a fighter pilot and flew both F-84 and F-100 jets before transitioning to the F-105 Thunderchief.

In the autumn of 1966, after completing F-105 "Wild Weasel" training at George AFB, California, Thorsness was assigned to the 355th Tactical Fighter Wing based at Takhli Royal Thai Air Force Base in Thailand, flying as aircraft commander in F-105F's, tasked with locating and destroying North Vietnamese surface-to-air missile (SAM) sites.

== Medal of Honor mission ==
On April 19, 1967, Major Thorsness and his Electronic Warfare Officer, Captain Harold E. Johnson, flying F-105F AF Ser. No. 63-8301, led Kingfish flight (three F-105F Weasel aircraft and an F-105D single-seater) on a Wild Weasel SAM suppression mission. The strike force target was JCS target 22.00, the Xuan Mai army training compound, near heavily defended Hanoi. Thorsness directed Kingfish 03 and 04, the second element of F-105s, to troll north while he and his wingman maneuvered south, forcing defending gunners to divide their attention. Thorsness located two SAM sites and fired a Shrike missile to attack one, whose radar went off the air. He destroyed the second with cluster bombs, scoring a direct hit.

After this initial success, matters turned for the worse. Kingfish 02, crewed by Majors Thomas M. Madison and Thomas J. Sterling, flying aircraft F-105F AF Ser. No. 63-8341, was hit by anti-aircraft fire and both crewmen had to eject. Unknown to Thorsness, Kingfish 03 and 04 had been attacked by MiG-17s flying a low-altitude wagon wheel defensive formation. The afterburner of one of the F-105s wouldn't light and the element had disengaged and returned to base, leaving Kingfish 01 to fight solo.

As their F-105 circled the parachutes of Kingfish 02-Alpha and 02-Bravo, relaying the position to Crown, the airborne search and rescue HC-130 command aircraft, Johnson spotted a MiG-17 off their right wing. Thorsness, even though his F-105 was not designed for air-to-air combat, attacked the MiG and destroyed it with 20-mm cannon fire, just as a second MiG closed on his tail. Low on fuel, Thorsness outran his pursuers and left the battle area to rendezvous with a KC-135 tanker over Laos.

Thorsness described the incident:

It appeared the MiG was going after the chutes so I took off after him. I was a little high, dropped down to about 1000 feet, and headed north after him. We were doing about 550 knots and really catching up fast. At about 3000 feet (range) I fired a burst but missed. I lined him up again and was closing very fast. I was a bit below him now. At 700 feet or so I pull my trigger and pulled the pipper through him. Parts of his left started coming off. Suddenly I realized that Harry Johnson was frantically trying to get my attention. There were a couple of MiGs on our tail! If I had hit that MiG dead on, we probably would have swallowed some of his debris. But we got him! I lit the burner, dropped down as low as possible, and ducked into the hills west of Hanoi. The MiGs could not keep up with us.

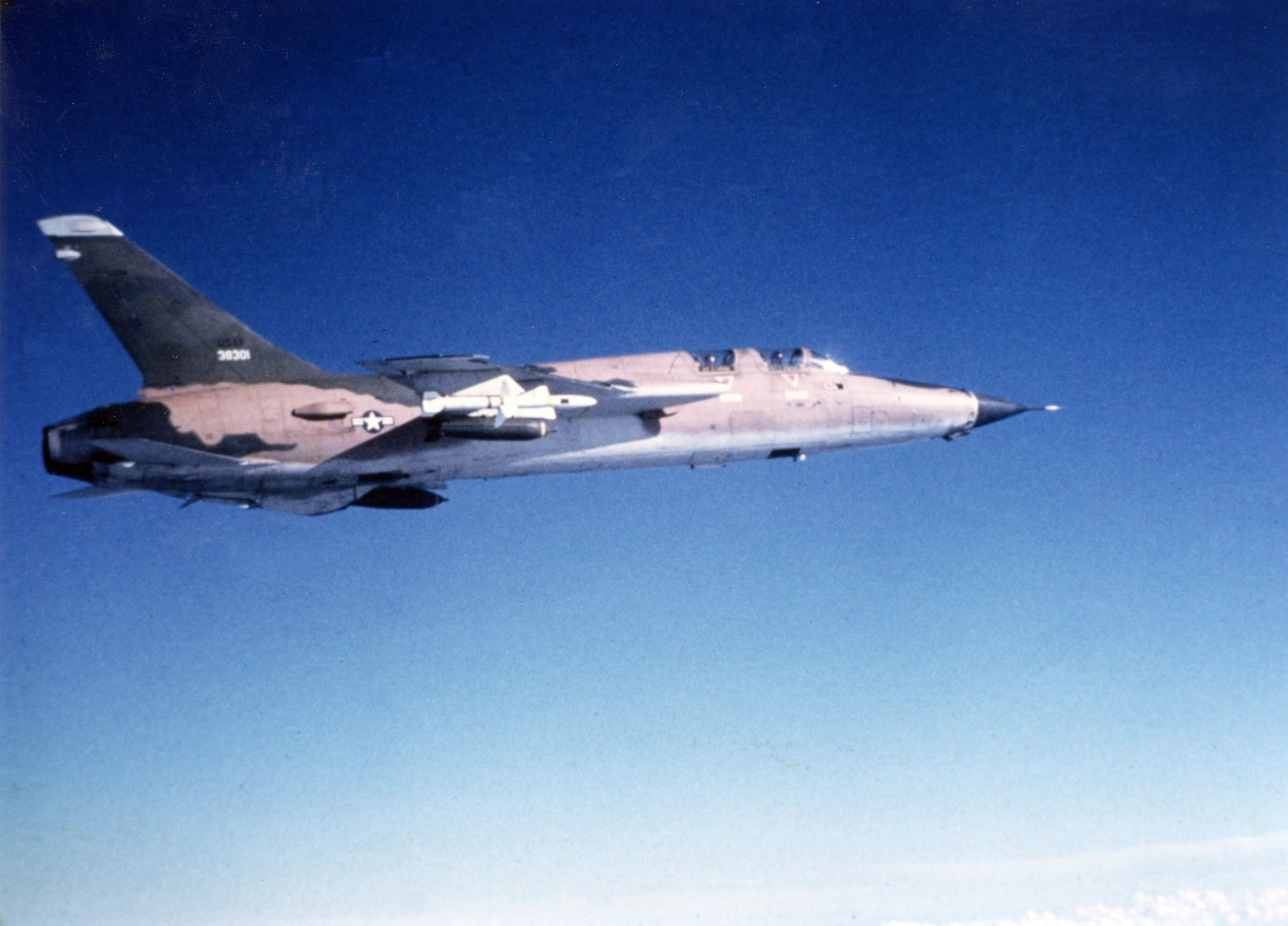
The F-105F, AF Ser. No. 63-8301, flown by Maj Thorsness and Capt Johnson on April 19, 1967.

As this occurred, the initial element of the rescue force—a pair of A-1E "Sandies"—arrived to locate the position of the downed crewmen before calling in the waiting HH-53 Jolly Green helicopters orbiting at a holding point over Laos. Thorsness, with only 500 rounds of ammunition left, turned back from the tanker to fly RESCAP (rescue combat air patrol) for the Sandies and update them on the situation and terrain. As Thorsness approached the area, briefing the Sandies, he spotted MiG-17s in a wagon wheel orbit around him and attacked, probably destroying another that flew across his path.

He commented:

One of the MiGs flew right into my gunsight at about 2000 feet (range). I pulled the trigger and saw pieces start falling off the aircraft. They hadn't seen us, but they did now! Johnson shouted at me that we had four more MiGs on our tail and they were closing fast. I dropped down on the deck, sometimes as low as fifty feet, hit the burner, and twisted through the hills and valleys trying to lose them.

Pairs of MiGs attacked each propeller-driven Sandy as it came out of its turn in search orbit, shooting down the leader (Maj. John S. Hamilton in A-1E 52-133905) with cannon fire when he failed to heed warnings from Sandy 02 to break into the attack, and forced the wingman into a series of repeated evasive turns. Sandy 02 reported the situation and Thorsness advised him to keep turning and announced his return.

Although all of his ammunition had been depleted, Thorsness reversed and flew back to the scene, hoping in some way to draw the MiGs away from the surviving A-1. However, as he re-engaged, Panda flight from the 355th TFW strike force arrived back in the area. It had dropped its ordnance on the target and was en route to its post-strike aerial refueling when Kingfish 02 went down. Panda had jettisoned its wing tanks, making the rescue radar controller reluctant to use it to CAP the rescue effort, but it filled its internal tanks and returned to North Vietnam at high altitude to conserve fuel.

Panda's four F-105s burst through the defensive circle at high speed, then engaged the MiGs in a turning dogfight, permitting Kingfish 01 to depart the area after a 50-minute engagement against SAMs, antiaircraft guns, and MiGs. Panda 01 (Capt William E. Eskew) shot down a MiG, during which the surviving Sandy escaped, and he and his wingman Panda 02 (Capt Paul A. Seymour) each damaged one of the others. Two other MiGs were shot down by members of a third F-105 strike flight, Nitro 01 (Major Jack W. Hunt) and Nitro 03 (Maj Theodore G. "Ted" Tolman), in another of the 17 MiG engagements on this mission.

Again low on fuel and facing nightfall, Thorsness was headed towards a tanker when Panda 03 (Capt Howard L. Bodenhamer), an F-105 of the flight that had rescued Sandy 02, transmitted by radio that he was critically low on fuel. Thorsness quickly calculated that Kingfish 01 had sufficient fuel to fly to Udorn, near the Mekong River and 200 miles (320 km) closer, so he vectored the tanker toward Panda 03. When within 60 miles (97 km) of Udorn, he throttled back to idle and "glided" toward the base, touching down "long" (mid-runway) as his fuel totalizer indicated empty tanks. Johnson told Thorsness upon touchdown, "Leo, that was a full day's work."

The mission was recreated by The History Channel as part of Episode 12 ("Long Odds") of its series Dogfights, and first telecast on January 19, 2007. However, Kingfish Flight was incorrectly referred to as "Cadillac" flight.

== Prisoner of war ==
On April 30, 1967, on their 93rd mission (seven shy of completing their tours), Thorsness and Johnson were shot down by a Mikoyan-Gurevich MiG-21 over North Vietnam while flying aircraft F-105F, AF Ser. No. 62-4447. He had flown the morning mission to the Hanoi area as Wild Weasel leader, then assigned himself as a spare aircraft for the afternoon mission because of a shortage of crews. One of Carbine flight aborted with radio problems, and Thorsness filled in as Carbine 03, leading the second element.

While still inbound over northwest North Vietnam, communications were disrupted when an ejection seat emergency beeper went off aboard one of the F-105s. Despite being observed by early warning radar locations, two MiG-21s approached Carbine flight from behind and unseen. Just as Thorsness got an instrument indication that the flight was being painted by airborne radar, he saw an F-105 going down in flames that eventually was identified as his own wingman, Carbine 04 (1st Lt Robert Abbott, in F-105D, AF Ser. No. 59-1726), shot down by an Atoll missile. Within a minute, his own aircraft was also hit with a heat-seeking missile fired by the MiGs.

Thorsness and Johnson ejected. Separated from each other by a ridge, they were the object of a three-hour rescue effort involving the entire strike force as a covering force. Two F-105D aircraft were directed by Crown to provide RESCAP (as Tomahawk flight) until the combat search and rescue (CSAR) forces could arrive on station. Both aircraft were hit by Atoll missiles from MiG 21s, with F-105D, AF Ser. No. 61-0130, piloted by Captain Joe Abbott being shot down, and wingman Major Al Lenski limping back to Thailand. In addition, one of the A-1 Sandy aircraft was hit while one of the rescue HH-53s developed hydraulic problems and had to abort, thus ending the CSAR mission. Poor communications, heavy MiG engagements and standard operating procedures which did not allow only one CSAR helicopter to remain on station, made the effort futile and all the men were captured. CSAR forces were again launched the next day but none of the downed airmen were located. The mission is described in great detail, including verbatim transcripts of radio transmissions, in both Thud Ridge and Thud, written by Col Jack Broughton, member of Waco flight and another of the RESCAP crews involved in the incident.

His uncooperativeness towards his captors earned him a year in solitary confinement and severe back injuries due to torture. The Medal of Honor was awarded to Thorsness during his captivity, but not announced until his release in 1973 to prevent the Vietnamese from using it against Thorsness, as was the Air Force Cross awarded to Johnson for the same mission. Abbott was released from captivity on February 18, 1973, while Thorsness, Johnson, and Abbott were released on March 4, 1973, during Operation Homecoming.

Injuries incurred during the ejection and aggravated by the torture Thorsness was subjected to disqualified him medically from further flying in the Air Force and he retired on October 25, 1973, at the rank of colonel.

Thorsness was a command pilot in the USAF with 5,000 flying hours in L-21, T-6 Texan, T-28 Trojan, T-33 Shooting Star, F-84B and D Thunderjet, F-84F Thunderstreak, F-100C and D Super Sabre, and F-105B, D, and F Thunderchief aircraft.

== Post-military life ==
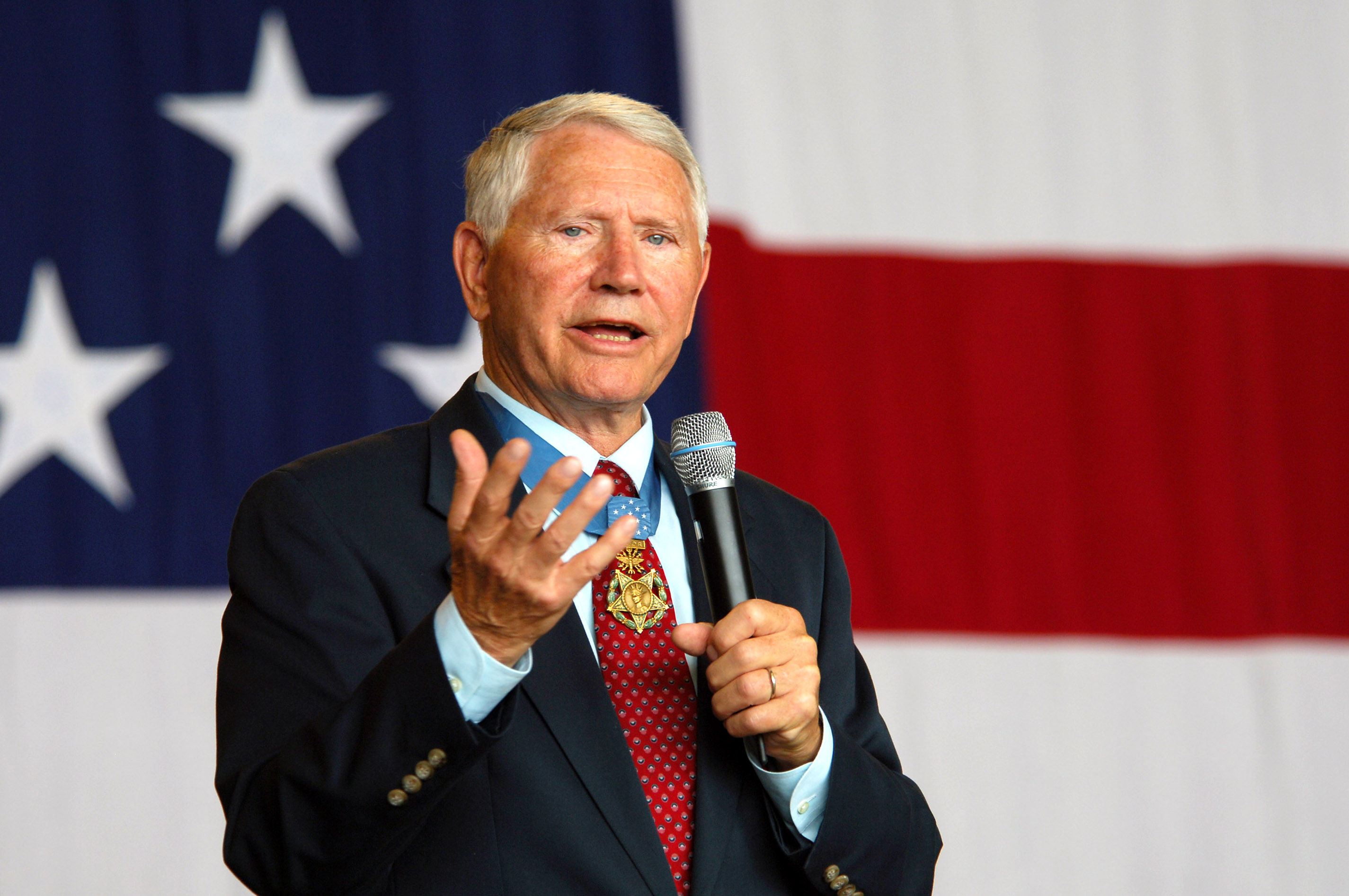
Thorsness speaking at a 2007 event commemorating the 60th anniversary of the U.S. Air Force

From 1979 to 1985, Thorsness served as Director of Civic Affairs for Litton Industries. He then served as a state senator in Washington. Following his retirement, he served on the board of directors of the Congressional Medal of Honor Foundation. He moved from Catalina, Arizona, to Madison, Alabama, with his wife in early 2008 to be close to family.

In 2004, the University of Richmond announced the establishment of an endowed chair in leadership and ethics named in honor of Thorsness. The Colonel Leo K. and Gaylee Thorsness Endowed Chair in Ethical Leadership was funded by a $1,000,000 gift organized by W. Thomas Matthews, President and CEO of the Global Private Client Group at Smith Barney. Thorsness also served as Distinguished Leader in Residence at the Jepson School of Leadership Studies. The Thorsness chair is held by Donelson R. Forsyth, a social psychologist with expertise in group dynamics.

Thorsness' autobiography, Surviving Hell: A POW's Journey, was published in December 2008.

Thorsness died on May 2, 2017, in St. Augustine, Florida, at the age of 85. According to his wife, Gaylee, the cause of death was leukemia. He was buried with full military honors at Arlington National Cemetery. In August 2020, Thorsness was named the Class Exemplar for the United States Air Force Academy's Class of 2023.

== Political career ==
In the 1974 U.S. Senate election in South Dakota, Thorsness was the Republican nominee against the incumbent Democrat George McGovern. It was believed that McGovern faced possible defeat for allegedly having neglected the state during his long 1972 presidential campaign. By May 1973, McGovern had already begun campaigning for reelection. Thorsness had just been repatriated after six years as a prisoner of war in North Vietnam. He accused McGovern of having given aid and comfort to the enemy and of having prolonged Thorsness' time as a POW. McGovern replied that if there had been no war, there would have been no POWs, and that everything he had done had been towards the goal of ending the war sooner. However, the war did not become a significant issue in the Senate race. Instead, the campaign was dominated by farm policy differences and economic concerns over the 1973–75 recession. Thorsness charged McGovern with being a "part-time senator" more concerned with national office and with spending over $2 million on his re‑election bid, while McGovern labelled Thorsness a carpetbagger because he was originally from Minnesota. In a year in which Democrats were advantaged by the after-effects of the Watergate scandal, McGovern won re-election in November 1974 with 53 percent of the votes cast.

Thorsness settled in Seattle Washington, and was elected to the state senate on November 8, 1988. In accordance with Washington State law, he immediately became the senator from District 11 to serve the unexpired term of Avery Garrett, who died in April 1988. In January 1989, Thorsness took the oath of office for a four-year term. In the state senate Thorsness sponsored a bill dubbed the "Truth Bill" on March 3, 1990. The legislature unanimously passed the measure, SJM 8020, urging the Federal government to release information about 30,000 U.S. soldiers listed as either prisoners of war or missing in action in conflicts dating back to World War II. It further urged the United States Congress to pass a similar measure, HR3603, that would force the federal government to declassify information pertaining to over 30,000 missing American servicemen. In sponsoring the bill, Thorsness said that the government kept the information classified to protect intelligence sources, but that the sources are no longer useful because the conflict occurred decades ago. In 1992, he was an unsuccessful candidate in the Republican primary election for United States Senate. After a single term, Thorsness retired to Indianola, Washington.

== Awards and decorations ==
Thorsness' awards and decorations include:

US Air Force Command Pilot Badge
Medal of Honor
Silver Star w/ 1 bronze oak leaf cluster	Legion of Merit	Distinguished Flying Cross w/ Valor device and 1 silver oak leaf cluster
Bronze Star w/ Valor device and 1 bronze oak leaf cluster	Purple Heart w/ 1 bronze oak leaf cluster	Air Medal w/ 1 silver and 3 bronze oak leaf clusters
Air Medal (second ribbon required for accouterment spacing)	Air Force Commendation Medal	Air Force Presidential Unit Citation
Air Force Outstanding Unit Award w/ Valor device	Prisoner of War Medal	Combat Readiness Medal
Army Good Conduct Medal	National Defense Service Medal w/ 1 bronze service star	Vietnam Service Medal w/ 2 silver and 2 bronze campaign stars
Vietnam Service Medal w/ 2 bronze campaign stars (second ribbon required for accouterment spacing)	Air Force Longevity Service Award w/ 1 silver oak leaf cluster	Armed Forces Reserve Medal
Small Arms Expert Marksmanship Ribbon	Republic of Vietnam Gallantry Cross	Vietnam Campaign Medal

=== Medal of Honor citation ===
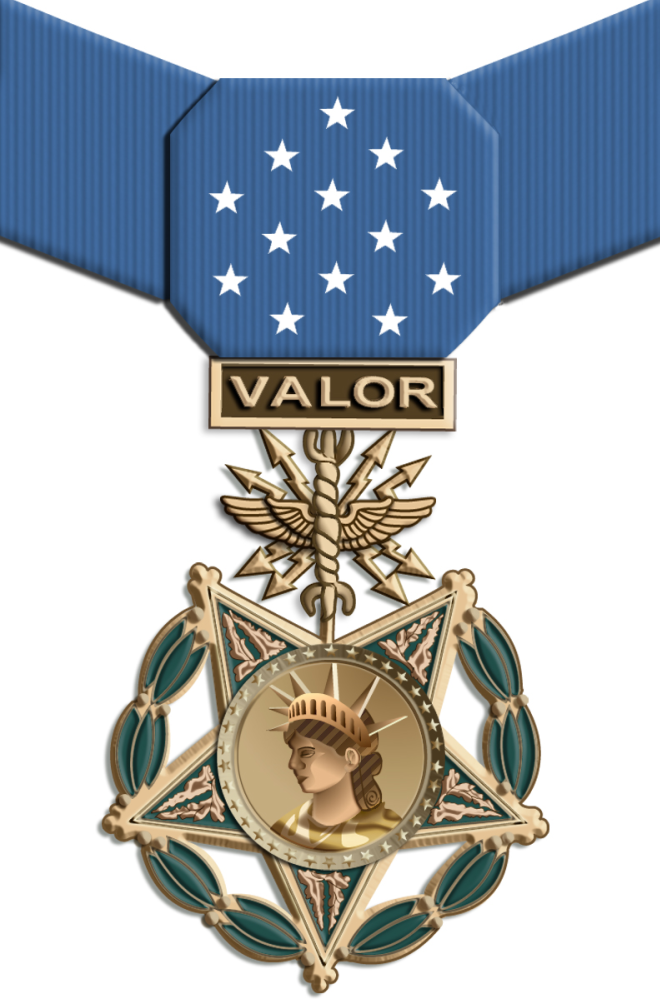
Air Force Medal of Honor

The President of the United States in the name of the Congress takes pride in presenting the Medal of Honor to LIEUTENANT COLONEL LEO K. THORSNESS
UNITED STATES AIR FORCE for service as set forth in the following citation:

For conspicuous gallantry and intrepidity in action at the risk of his life above and beyond the call of duty. As pilot of an F-105 aircraft, Lieutenant Colonel Thorsness was on a surface-to-air missile suppression mission over North Vietnam. Lieutenant Colonel Thorsness and his wingman attacked and silenced a surface-to-air missile site with air-to-ground missiles and then destroyed a second surface-to-air missile site with bombs. In the attack on the second missile site, Lieutenant Colonel Thorsness' wingman was shot down by intensive antiaircraft fire, and the two crewmembers abandoned their aircraft.

Lieutenant Colonel Thorsness circled the descending parachutes to keep the crewmembers in sight and relay their position to the Search and Rescue Center. During this maneuver, a MIG-17 was sighted in the area. Lieutenant Colonel Thorsness immediately initiated an attack and destroyed the MIG. Because his aircraft was low on fuel, he was forced to depart the area in search of a tanker.

Upon being advised that two helicopters were orbiting over the downed crew's position and that there were hostile MIGs in the area posing a serious threat to the helicopters, Lieutenant Colonel Thorsness, despite his low fuel condition, decided to return alone through a hostile environment of surface-to-air missile and anti-aircraft defenses to the downed crew's position. As he approached the area, he spotted four MIG-17 aircraft and immediately initiated an attack on the MIGs, damaging one and driving the others away from the rescue scene. When it became apparent that an aircraft in the area was critically low on fuel and the crew would have to abandon the aircraft unless they could reach a tanker, Lieutenant Colonel Thorsness, although critically short on fuel himself, helped to avert further possible loss of life and a friendly aircraft by recovering at a forward operating base, thus allowing the aircraft in emergency fuel condition to refuel safely.

Lieutenant Colonel Thorsness' extraordinary heroism, self-sacrifice and personal bravery involving conspicuous risk of life were in the highest traditions of the military service, and have reflected great credit upon himself and the U.S. Air Force.

== Electoral history ==
U.S. Senator, Class 3, from Washington, 1992 Republican Primary Election
Party	Candidate	Votes	%	±%
Republican	Rod Chandler	228,083	42.10	
Republican	Leo K. Thorsness	185,498	34.24	
Republican	Tim Hill	128,232	23.67	

Washington's 11th Legislative District State Senator, 1988 General Election
Party	Candidate	Votes	%	±%
Republican	Leo K. Thorsness	18,153	50.43	
Democratic	Eugene V. Lux (Appointed Incumbent)	17,842	49.57	

Washington's 11th Legislative District State Senator, 1988 Republican Primary Election
Party	Candidate	Votes	%	±%
Republican	Leo K. Thorsness	5,951	73.13	
Republican	Jesse Anderson	2,187	26.87	

U.S. Representative from South Dakota's 1st congressional district, 1978 General Election
Party	Candidate	Votes	%	±%
Democratic	Tom Daschle	64,683	50.05	
Republican	Leo K. Thorsness	64,544	49.95	

U.S. Representative from South Dakota's 1st congressional district, 1978 Republican Primary Election
Party	Candidate	Votes	%	±%
Republican	Leo K. Thorsness	28,325	64.79	
Republican	David Volk	15,396	35.21	

U.S. Senator, Class 3, from South Dakota, 1974 General Election
Party	Candidate	Votes	%	±%
Democratic	George McGovern (Incumbent)	147,929	53.04	−3.75
Republican	Leo K. Thorsness	130,955	46.96	

U.S. Senator, Class 3, from South Dakota, 1974 Republican Primary Election
Party	Candidate	Votes	%	±%
Republican	Leo K. Thorsness	49,716	52.35	
Republican	Al Schock	35,406	37.28	
Republican	Barbara Bates Gunderson	9,852	10.37	

== See also ==
- List of Medal of Honor recipients for the Vietnam War
- In May 2010 Goodfellow AFB, TX dedicated a visiting officer's quarters in his name. Thorsness Manor.

== Notes ==
Party political offices
Preceded by Archie M. Gubbrud	Republican nominee for U.S. Senator from South Dakota (Class 3); 1974	Succeeded by James Abdnor
