= Old 666 =

Boeing B-17 Flying Fortress bomber

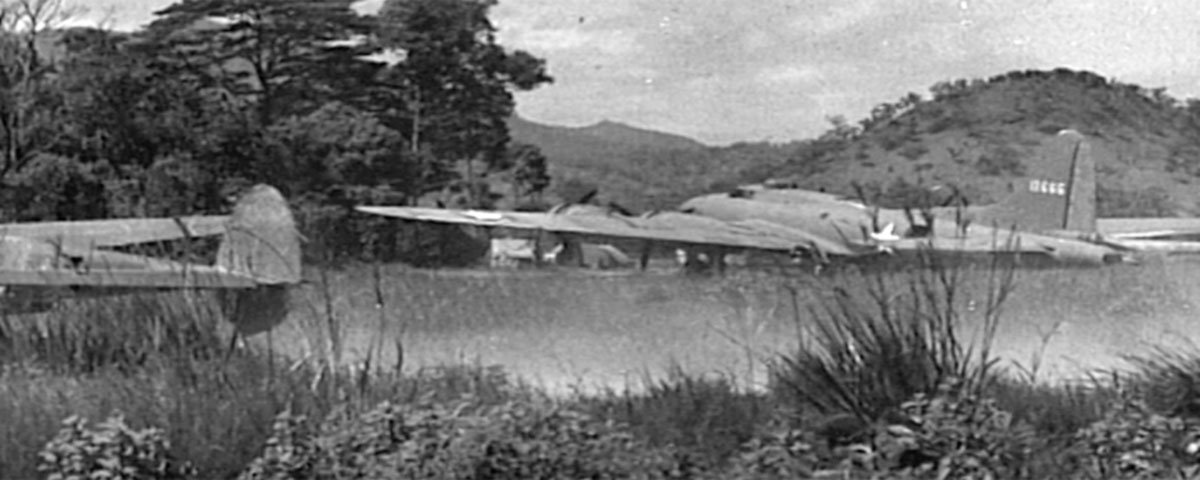
- Old 666 at 14-Mile Airstrip, May 1943.

General information
- Other name: Lucy
- Type: Boeing B-17E Flying Fortress
- Manufacturer: Boeing
- Owners: USAAF
- Construction number: 2487
- Serial: 41-2666

History
- Manufactured: March 1942
- In service: 1942–1943
- Fate: Scrapped (September 1945)

Old 666 was a Boeing B-17E Flying Fortress heavy bomber, serial number 41-2666, assigned to the United States Army Air Forces (USAAF) 19th and 43rd Bombardment Groups in 1942–1943. It is notable for being the aircraft piloted by Lt. (then Captain) Jay Zeamer Jr. on the 16 June 1943 mission which earned him and 2nd Lt. Joseph Sarnoski each a Medal of Honor, and all other members of the aircrew the Distinguished Service Cross.

== History ==
Boeing B-17E Flying Fortress serial number 41-2666 was built in Boeing Plant 2, Seattle, Washington, in March 1942. It arrived in Hawaii in May 1942 for delivery to Australia. That same month, it was assigned to the 19th Bombardment Group. Sometime after it arrived in Australia, 41-2666 was equipped with a trimetrogon camera array used in high-altitude topographical mapping.

During the summer and fall of 1942, the Flying Fortress was flown primarily by the 8th Photo Reconnaissance Squadron (PRS), usually while attached to the 19th. Late in the year, it was transferred to the 43rd Bomb Group, where during a mission in December 1942, it was damaged severely enough to be grounded for a long period of time. Nothing more is known about the aircraft until the following April, when it was once again being flown on photo-recon missions by the 8th PRS. In May 1943, having by then gained a reputation as a “Hard Luck Hattie” for its record of acquiring ongoing damage and oddball accidents, 41-2666 was transferred to the 65th Bombardment Squadron, 43rd Bombardment Group, at Seven-Mile Airstrip, located at Port Moresby, New Guinea.

=== Zeamer's "Eager Beavers" ===
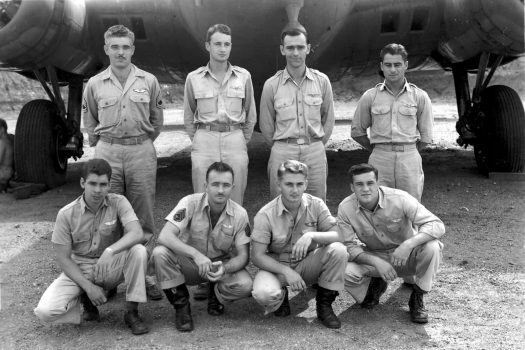
The original “Eager Beavers”. Front (l to r): Sgt. William Vaughan, Sgt. George Kendrick, Sgt. Johnnie Able, Sgt. Herbert Pugh. Back (l to r): Bud Thues, Capt. Jay Zeamer, Hank Dyminski, 2nd Lt. Joe Sarnoski. Just prior to the 16 June 1943 mission, Tech. Sgt. Forrest Dillman was added to the crew, and Lt. John Britton and Lt. Ruby Johnston replaced Dyminski and Thues, who had contracted malaria.

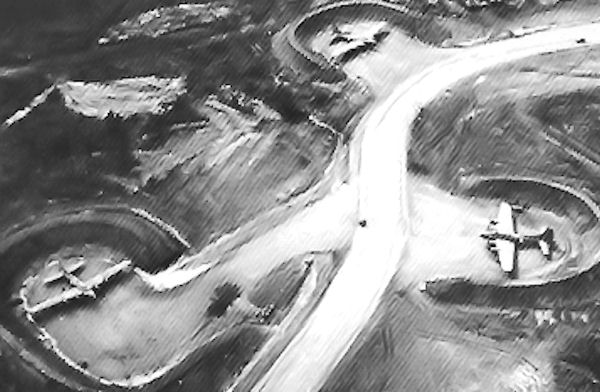
An aerial view of B-17s from the 43rd Bombardment Group parked in their revetments at Seven-Mile Airstrip in August 1942

Captain Jay Zeamer Jr., the squadron executive officer at the time, requisitioned the B-17 for use by his own selected aircrew, who called themselves the Eager Beavers, (Note: This aircrew should not be confused with a B-17F nicknamed The Eager Beaver, s/n 42-29816 assigned to the 401st Bombardment Squadron in England, which was lost in a mid-air collision on 31 August 1943. The nickname was also used by some other B-17s and aircraft of the era.) due to Zeamer's regular habit of volunteering for missions. Besides significantly reducing its overall weight by 2,000 pounds (910 kg), including stripping out unnecessary structure, cartridge belts, and ammunition feed equipment, the aircrew also replaced the four aging engines with new ones, as Zeamer wanted a fast aircraft.

An Associated Press (AP) report dated 30 April 1943 recounted Zeamer and his crew dropping from 8,000 feet (2,400 m) to 300 feet (91 m) to complete a reconnaissance mission over Rabaul, New Britain, while harassed by 15 to 20 Japanese Zero fighters; the action yielded Silver Star decorations for the crew. Another AP article, dated 30 May 1943, reported Zeamer and his crew strafing Japanese searchlights while flying over Wewak, New Guinea, at an altitude of 900 feet (270 m). At least one version of that article noted the crew's "Eager Beavers" nickname.

According to Zeamer's own flight log entry for the 16 June 1943 mission, and the 65th Bombardment Squadron morning report for that mission, the crew had increased the plane's active armament from 12 to 16 M2 Browning .50 caliber machine guns. (Note: Usual armament of a B-17 in the Pacific at this time was 12 machine guns: ball turret (2), waist guns (2), tail guns (2), radio compartment (1), top turret (2), cheek guns (2), and nose (1).) The plane had custom-engineered twin .50s mounted in both waist positions and overhead in the radio compartment (rather than a single .50 in each position) and a single fixed .50 mounted on the deck to the right of the bombardier's chair, specially sighted and wired for Zeamer to fire remotely from his pilot's control yoke, through the lower right nose plexiglass ball socket. (Note: Zeamer also reported a single .50 machine gun mounted through the floor aft of the belly turret. This detail conflicts with the central .50 already mounted in the plane's nose combing—the B-17E series came equipped from Boeing with three forward nose combing ball sockets; there were also two staggered gun ball sockets, one in the port side nose window and one in the starboard-side nose window. The forward-mounted .50 in the nose was for use by the bombardier, which was confirmed by navigator Ruby Johnston; such a single .50 mount was common in 43rd BG B-17s. It would have been unusual for Zeamer to have removed such a useful machine gun when his goal was to increase the aircraft's frontal fire power. Both .50s could not be present and also match the 16 machine guns confirmed by Zeamer's original flight log and by the morning report of the 65th BS. Therefore, the rear, floor-mounted machine gun Zeamer said he remembered more than likely came from a misplaced memory of his prior assignment with B-26s of the 22nd Bombardment Group; some of those aircraft had single-mounted machine guns installed in their lower hatch positions.) Additionally, three loose .50s were carried in the aircraft's catwalk for quick substitution in case any machine guns became inoperable for any reason. This accounts for the 19 machine guns Zeamer referred to in a 1945 issue of The American Magazine.

As for the B-17's name, Zeamer's aircrew referred to 41-2666 only as "666" or "the plane". On 14 June 1943, two days before their final mission together, Zeamer officially named their B-17 Lucy. He had the name painted in script under the three windows on the port side nose, mostly between and underneath the small forward window and larger gun window on that side. This was in honor of Lucile Christmas, the daughter of Major General John K. Christmas, whom he dated stateside while stationed at Langley Air Force Base. Despite their extensive reworking of the B-17, Zeamer and his aircrew flew 41-2666 only five times, two of which were test hops. Standard bombing missions were flown by the other Flying Fortresses, reserving "666"/ Lucy and its specialty camera array for photo and mapping work.

=== Mapping mission ===
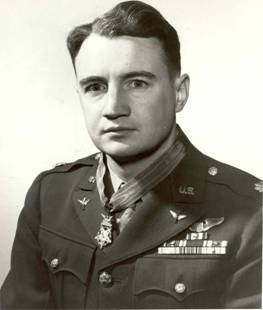
Jay Zeamer Jr., pilot

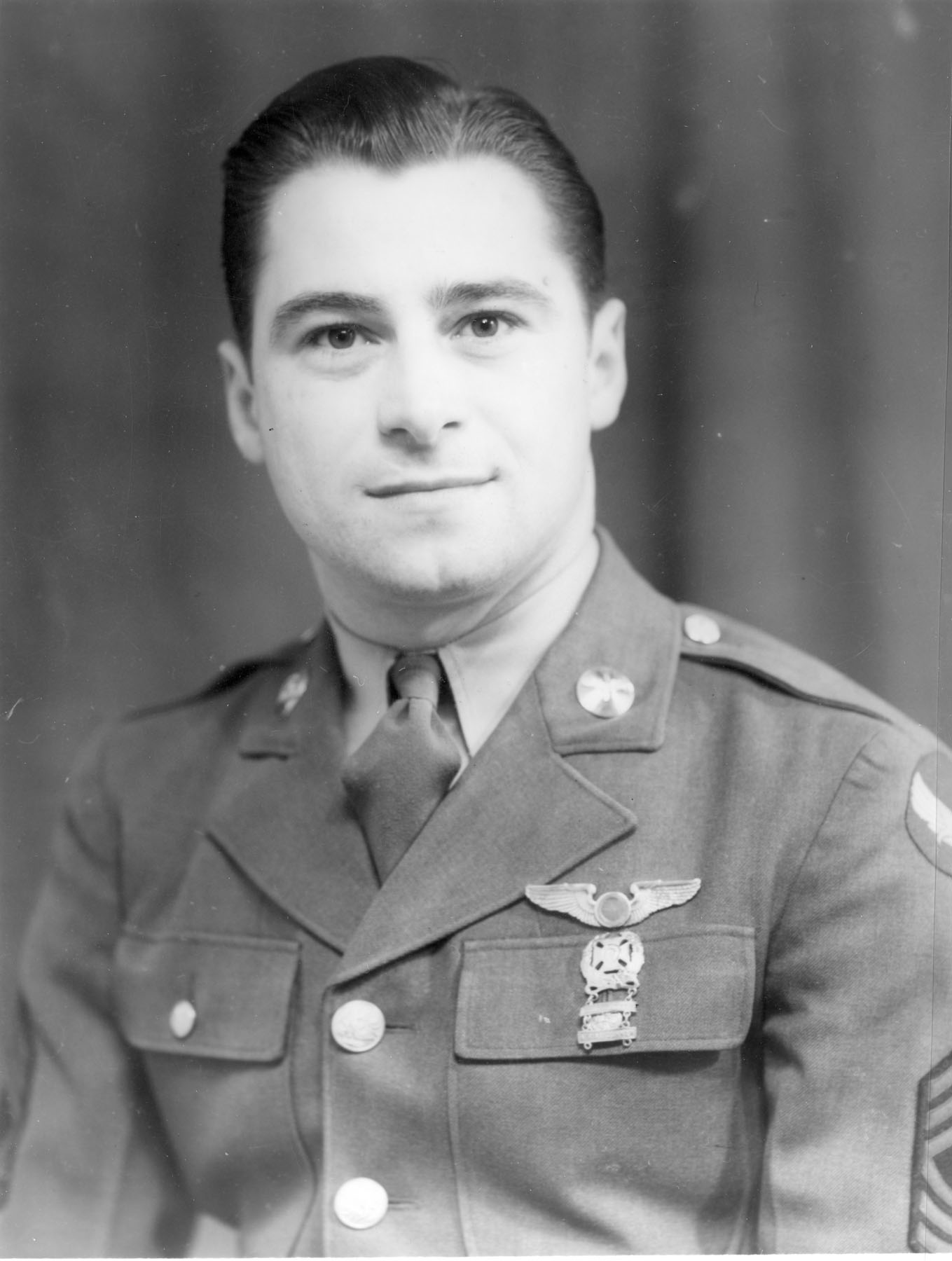
Joseph Sarnoski, bombardier

Zeamer's aircrew flew three reconnaissance missions in 41-2666, the last occurring on 16 June 1943. It called for a solo B-17 to map the west coast of Bougainville Island, almost 600 miles (970 km) over mostly open ocean from Seven-Mile, in support of a planned invasion of the island later that year. Such mapping demanded rigorously straight and level flight for the duration to avoid blurring of the photos, and this mission would require a 22-minute level run over hostile territory.

Zeamer had volunteered for the mission when it was first requested in April, but weather and other factors forced postponements until the June date. Twice before taking off at 4:00 a.m., 16 June, Zeamer rejected orders to add to the mission a reconnaissance of Buka airdrome, located off Bougainville's northern tip. The assigned mapping would be hazardous enough, he felt, without prematurely alerting the airbase of their presence.

Early arrival at the initial mapping point meant a half-hour delay in starting the mapping run; the sun was not high enough for the light necessary for topographic relief. The delay prompted Zeamer to ask his aircrew's opinion of the Buka recon. All supported going ahead with it, considering their proximity. As a result, Zeamer circled to come over Buka from the northeast, so as to continue into the mapping run down Bougainville's west coast.

Contemporary accounts indicate the aircrew counting around 50 enemy aircraft on either side of the airfield, with crew statements given in support of Zeamer's Medal of Honor reporting 17 or 18 Japanese fighters either taxiing or taking off, as Old 666 flew over the island. These were Japanese Navy Model 22 Zeroes of 251 Kukutai (Air Squadron), most of which were usually based at Rabaul, New Britain. They had moved to Buka airdrome the previous day for a planned 16 June attack on Guadalcanal. Zeamer began the mapping run, hoping to complete it before the Zeros could reach their mapping altitude at 25,000 feet (7,600 m). Shortly before its completion, ineffectual passes from below were followed by a handful of Zeros enclosing the B-17 from below in a coordinated attack, two approaching from the rear and three fanned across the front. The combination left Zeamer unable to execute his usual defensive air tactic of turning inside the line of fire of enemy aircraft attacking from the front. Such a maneuver, in this case, would expose his B-17's belly to the Zeros attacking from the front. Aware of their position over Empress Augusta Bay, the primary mapping objective, Zeamer held the course, hoping to fight it out.

This first attack proved fatal for bombardier 2nd Lt. Joseph Sarnoski, who was mortally wounded by a 20mm shell hit, which also badly injured the navigator, 1st Lt. Ruby Johnston. Another 20mm struck the side of the cockpit behind the pilots, sending shrapnel into the legs of Sgt. Johnny Able, the assistant flight engineer substituting that day as the top turret gunner. The shell also struck the oxygen and hydraulic lines behind the cockpit, starting a fire. A third 20mm shell entered through the plexiglass nose coaming, destroying Zeamer's rudder pedals and instrument panel, delivering grievous wounds to Zeamer's left leg, while also slicing his right wrist. Back in the B-17's nose, despite being blown to the floor with a horrible gash in his side and another in his neck, Sarnoski regained his machine gun in time to counter a twin-engine fighter (later confirmed to be a Nakajima J1N "Irving") pressing a new attack on their nose. Sarnoski drove the attacker off before it could inflict more damage, then collapsed from his wounds.

Having finished the mapping run and now needing oxygen, Zeamer dove Old 666 down to about 10,000 feet (3,000 m), estimating his altitude from a change in manifold pressure, as the altimeter had been destroyed. During or shortly after the dive, radio operator Sgt. William Vaughan was badly grazed in the neck by a round from a Zero following them down. After the long dive, both Johnston and Able extinguished the oxygen fire using only their hands and rags.

Leveling out, Zeamer continued to pilot the B-17 despite excruciating pain and continued blood loss. Correctly assuming that the forward machine guns were now inoperable, the Japanese pilots began lining up on both sides of Old 666 to circle around, one by one in turn, to strafe from the front. Zeamer was now able to execute the technique that he had been unable to use against the coordinated first pass. By banking hard inside the firing angle of each approaching Zero, Zeamer both avoided the enemy's machine gun fire and allowed his rear gunners unfettered access to target the Zeros as they flew past. This continued until finally, low on ammunition and fuel, about forty minutes after the initial attack, the last of the remaining fighters returned to base.

Once out of danger, Sgt. Able piloted Old 666 on a dead-reckoning return heading, determined by the badly wounded Zeamer, while the unscathed substitute copilot, Lt. John T. Britton, took stock of the damage to the aircrew and their aircraft. Zeamer, drifting in and out of consciousness, advised Able on keeping level and on course. Radio operator Vaughan, while nursing his neck wound, calculated a heading for Dobodura, an Allied airfield on the eastern coast of Papua, New Guinea, for an emergency landing (it was not expected that Zeamer could survive a return flight over the Owen Stanley Range to Port Moresby). Britton, having returned to his seat for the balance of the flight, landed at Dobodura without working flaps or brakes, requiring him to carefully ground loop Old 666 near the end of the 6,000-foot (1,800 m) runway. There was no further damage to the B-17.

=== Aftermath ===
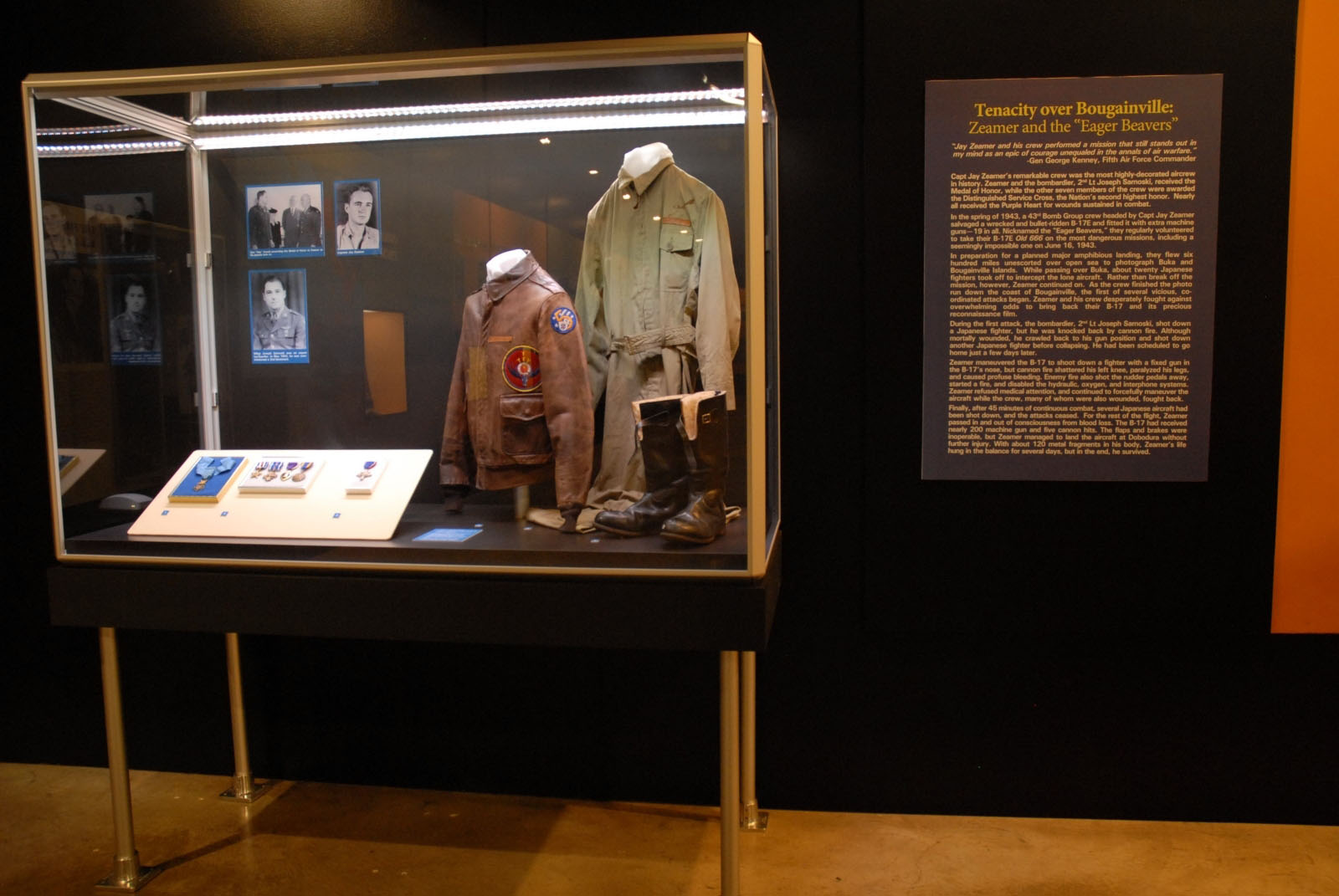
Tenacity over Bougainville: Zeamer and "The Eager Beavers” display in the World War II Gallery at the National Museum of the United States Air Force

In all, four members of the aircrew were wounded and one killed. Old 666 had suffered five 20mm cannon hits and 187 bullet holes. While the aircrew reported downing five Zeros, Japanese records show none were shot down, with one ditching early in the engagement, due to engine failure, and only three being damaged by return fire. Zeamer's injuries were reported in the New York Daily News on June 24, (Note: The Daily News reported the date of the incident as May 16 rather than June 16.) and the International News Service (INS) reported Sarnoski's death on August 10. An overall recounting of the mission was published in March 1944.

For the completion of their mission, despite the certainty of attack and their respective sacrifices, Sarnoski and Zeamer were each awarded the Medal of Honor, with the remainder of the aircrew receiving the Distinguished Service Cross, second only to the Medal of Honor. The mission remains the most highly decorated in American history, and the Eager Beavers, with their individual decorations considered together, the most highly-decorated aircrew in U.S. history.

Seven of the eight Zero pilots who intercepted Old 666 later participated in a strike on Allied shipping at Lunga Point that same day. Two of them, Warrant Officer Yoshio Oki and Flight Petty Officer 2nd Class Suehiro Yamamoto, failed to return.

By mid-1943, like most heavy bomb groups in the Pacific, the 43rd had mostly converted to the B-24. The aging and much-abused Pacific Flying Fortresses were increasingly difficult to maintain, and the longer range of the B-24 made it more practical in a theater of war defined by the vast distances to targets.

Due to its specialized nature, 41-2666 evaded retirement despite the damage it received on the 16 June 1943 mission. Repairs and modifications reversed many of the alterations made by the Eager Beavers. It was returned to the 8th PRS, and by fall it had even returned to combat, flying two missions with the 63rd Bombardment Squadron. By March 1944, Lucy had been returned to the US to be used as a base transport aircraft and later as a heavy bomber trainer. It was finally flown to Albuquerque, New Mexico, in August 1945 to be sold for scrap.

The Eager Beavers' mission was featured in a 2007 episode of the History Channel series Dogfights, titled "Long Odds".

== See also ==
- All American
- Memphis Belle
- Mizpah
- The Swoose
