= Donelson R. Forsyth =

American social psychologist (born 1953)

- Born: John Donelson Ross Forsyth; 1953 (age 72–73)
- Education: Florida State University; University of Florida (MA)
- Occupation: Social psychologist

John Donelson Ross Forsyth (born 1953) is an American social psychologist.

Forsyth studied sociology and psychology at Florida State University and pursued further study in psychology at the University of Florida where he earned a master of arts degree and doctorate. Forsyth began his teaching career as an assistant professor at Virginia Commonwealth University in 1978. He was promoted to associate professor in 1983, and became a full professor in 1989.

In 2005, Forsyth joined the University of Richmond faculty as the Colonel Leo K. and Gaylee Thorsness Chair in Ethical Leadership within the Jepson School of Leadership Studies. Forsyth was elected a fellow of the American Psychological Association in 2008, and that same year, served as president of the Society of Group Psychology and Group Psychotherapy.

== Research areas ==
Forsyth's primary areas of study are leadership, social cognition, and moral judgment. One of his focuses is the study of success and failure in groups and in individuals. He created the Ethics Position Questionnaire to examine individual differences in moral philosophies.
