= Ruthe Ridder =

American politician

Member of the Washington Senate from the 35th district
- In office January 14, 1974 – January 10, 1983
- Preceded by: Robert Ridder
- Succeeded by: Brad Owen

Personal details
- Born: June 13, 1929 (age 97) Pullman, Washington, U.S.
- Party: Democratic
- Spouse: Robert Ridder

Ruthe Ridder (born June 13, 1929) is an American former politician in the state of Washington. Ridder served in the Washington State Senate as a Democrat from the 35th District from 1974 to 1983. She attended the University of Washington and earned a Bachelor of Science degree in psychology. She served as the King County, Washington Assessor from 1984 to 1992.
