= Robert Ridder (politician) =

American educator and politician (1927–2021)

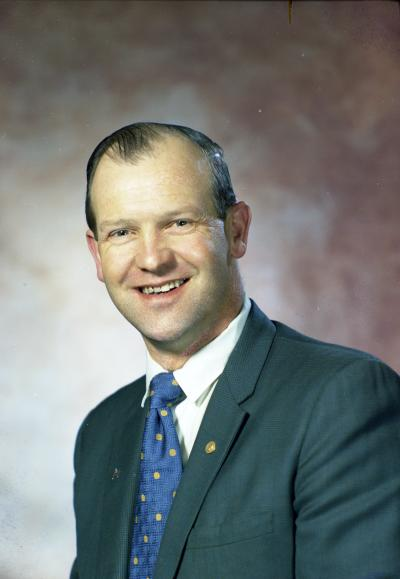
- Ridder in 1971

Member of the Washington Senate from the 35th district
- In office January 9, 1967 – July 19, 1973
- Preceded by: James E. Kennett
- Succeeded by: Ruthe Ridder

Personal details
- Born: February 25, 1927 Bellingham, Washington, U.S.
- Died: May 25, 2021 (aged 94) Rainier Beach, Seattle, Washington, U.S.
- Party: Democratic
- Spouse: Ruthe Ridder

Robert C. Ridder (February 25, 1927 – May 25, 2021) was an American educator and politician in the state of Washington. Ridder served in the Washington State Senate as a Democrat from the 35th District from 1967 to 1973. He attended the University of Washington and earned a Bachelor of Science degree, and completed graduate studies. He was later an educator, serving as a vice principal of a junior high school (Showalter Junior High - Tukwila, WA). He retired from his Senate seat in 1973 and was succeeded by his wife, Ruthe.
