= Strategic bombing during World War II =

Airborne warfare throughout World War II

- Part of World War II
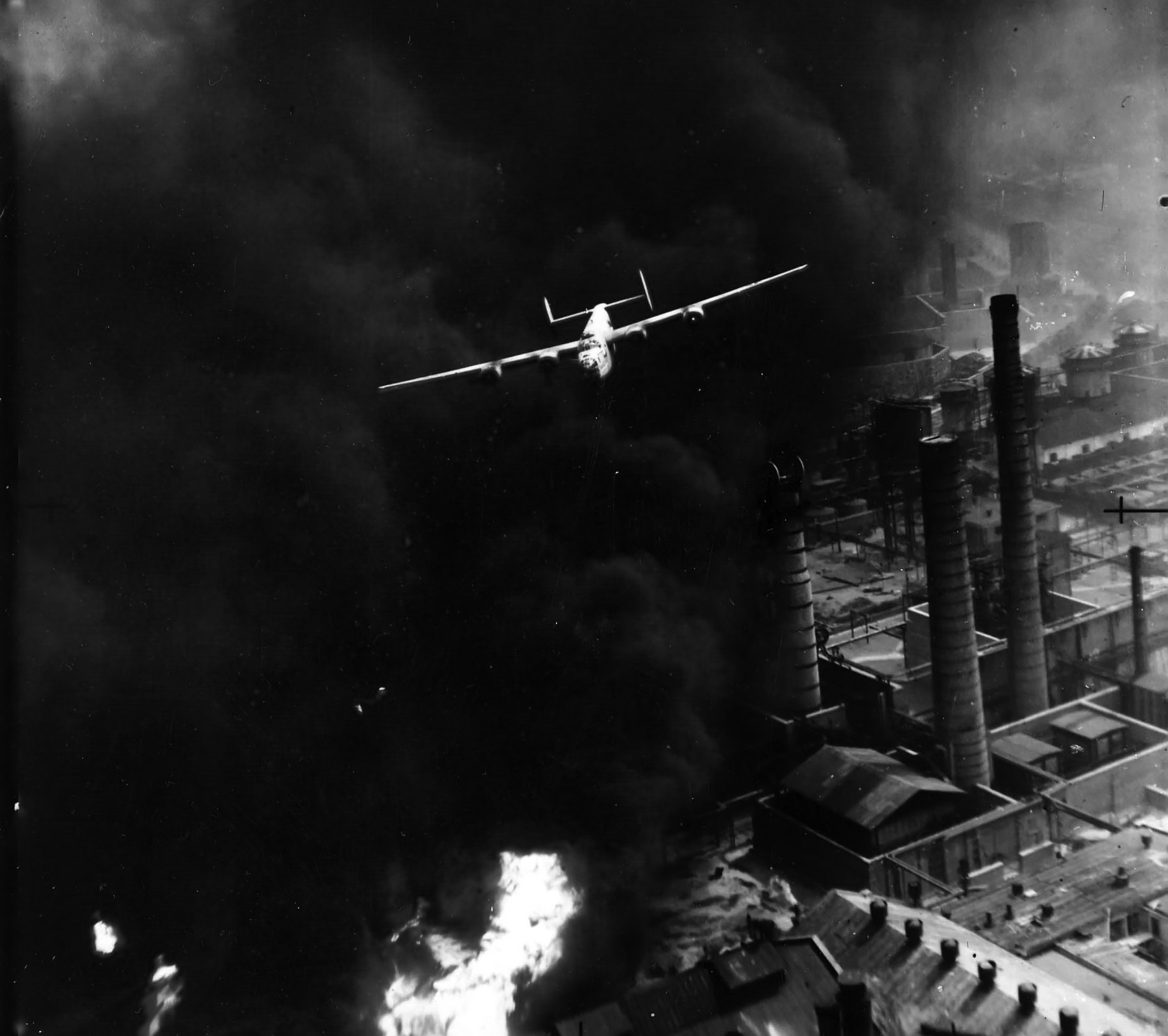
- A B-24 on a bomb run over the Astra Romana refinery in Ploiești, Romania, during Operation Tidal Wave
| Location | European Theatre of World War II; Pacific Theatre of World War II |

Belligerents
| Allied Powers; United Kingdom; United States (from 1941); Canada; Australia; New Zealand; Soviet Union (from 1941); FTR (until 1940); Free France (1940–1944); PGFR (from 1944); Poland (1939) (Polish government-in-exile) PAFITW; Czechoslovakia; China (from 1941) | Axis powers Germany; Japan (from 1940); Italy (1940–1943); Hungary (from 1940); Romania (1940–1944); Thailand (from 1941); Slovakia; Bulgaria (1941–1944) |

Commanders and leaders
| (United Kingdom) Charles Portal (United Kingdom) Richard Peirse (United Kingdom) Arthur Harris (United Kingdom) Arthur Tedder (United States) Henry Arnold (United States) Carl Spaatz (United States) Curtis LeMay (Canada) Clifford McEwen (Australia) George Jones (Soviet Union) Alexander Novikov (Soviet Union) Sergei Khudyakov (Soviet Union) Alexander Golovanov | (Nazi Germany) Hermann Göring (Nazi Germany) Albert Kesselring (Nazi Germany) Wolfram von Richthofen (Nazi Germany) Hugo Sperrle (Empire of Japan) Naruhiko Higashikuni (Empire of Japan) Hajime Sugiyama (Empire of Japan) Masakazu Kawabe (Empire of Japan) Chūichi Nagumo (Fascist Italy) Francesco Pricolo (Fascist Italy) Rino Corso Fougier (Fascist Italy) Ettore Muti (Kingdom of Hungary (1920–1946)) Kálmán Ternegg (Kingdom of Romania) Gheorghe Jienescu |

Casualties and losses
| Total: 749,940–1,305,029 dead: 248,664 military dead; Britain: 60,000 civilians killed; 160,000 airmen (all Allies, Europe); China: 260,000–351,000 Chinese civilians; At least 682 aircrew from both the regular air force (RoCAF) and crew members from warlord air forces KIA; France: 67,000 civilians killed from US-UK bombing; Half of the 2,500 French crewmen of the British RAF bomber command perished; Netherlands: 1,250–1,350 killed (army and civilians) between 10–15 May 1940; 10,000 Dutch civilians killed by air bombings from Allied Forces alone after 15 May 1940; Poland: 50,000 civilians in the 1939 campaign (including artillery bombardment and ground fighting). 2,500 – 7,000 civilians killed by bombing in Warsaw in 1939.; 2,416 airmen of bombing squadrons (Polish Airforce in the West); Soviet Union: 51,526 – 500,000 Soviet civilians (Note: British historian Richard Overy considers the 500,000 order of magnitude, claimed after the war in Soviet publications, to be "a rhetorical statistic, to demonstrate the level of sacrifice of the Soviet people and the wickedness of the German enemy". The figure "bears no relation to the detailed wartime documentary evidence". A much lower figure (51,526) is borne out by such evidence and "is much more consistent with the nature of the German bombing effort and the declining capability of the German bomber force as it struggled to sustain support for the ground war with dwindling resources",); 2,700 airmen (Japan); United States: 79,265 airmen/personnel (Europe); Over 3,033 airmen (Japan); Yugoslavia: 1,500 – 17,000 civilians in Belgrade | Total: 790,509–1,693,374+ dead Germany: 353,000–635,000 civilians killed, including foreign workers (Note: The 353,000 estimate is from Richard Overy, who explains this figure as follows: "If it is assumed that the figure of 271,000 dead by January 1945 is a realistic, if not precise, total (and there are archive figures which suggest a lower sum), it is possible to extrapolate from the last five months of heavy raiding for which records exist (September 1944 to January 1945) in order to find a possible order of magnitude for deaths in the last three months of the war. The average death toll for these five months was 18,777, which would give an aggregate figure for the whole war period of 328,000, though it would not allow for the exceptional casualty level at Dresden, confirmed by the latest research at approximately 25,000. Adding this would produce a total figure of approximately 353,000, representing 82,000 deaths in the last months. Detailed reconstruction of deaths caused by Royal Air Force bombing from February to May 1945, though incomplete, suggests a total of at least 57,000. If casualties inflicted by the American air forces are assumed to be lower, since their bombing was less clearly aimed at cities, an overall death toll of 82,000 is again statistically realistic. In the absence of unambiguous statistical evidence, the figure of 353,000 gives an approximate scale consistent with the evidence. It is a little over half the figure of 625,000 arrived at in the 1950s."); Very heavy damage to infrastructure; Japan: 330,000–500,000 civilians killed; 20,000 soldiers killed (in Hiroshima); Very heavy damage to industry; Italy: 60,000–100,000 civilians killed; 5,000 soldiers killed; Heavy damage to industry; Hungary: 19,135–30,000 killed and 25,000 wounded; Heavy damage to industry; Romania: 7,693 civilians killed and 7,809 wounded; Destruction and heavy damage to infrastructure and oil refineries; Bulgaria: 1,374 dead and 1,743 injured 12,564 buildings damaged, of which 2,670 completely destroyed; Thailand: At least 2,000 dead; Slovakia: 300–770 civilians killed |

World War II (1939–1945) involved sustained strategic bombing of railways, harbours, cities, workers' and civilian housing, and industrial districts in enemy territory. Strategic bombing as a military strategy is distinct both from close air support of ground forces and from tactical air power. During World War II, many military strategists of air power believed that air forces could win major victories by attacking industrial and political infrastructure, rather than purely military targets. Strategic bombing often involved bombing areas inhabited by civilians, and some campaigns were deliberately designed to target civilian populations in order to terrorize them or to weaken their morale. (Note: Primoratz, Igor. 2010. Terror from the Sky : The Bombing of German Cities in World War II. New York: Berghahn Books. "In World War II, the Allies bombed Germany’s cities and towns in an attempt to undermine the morale of its civilian population and force its government to halt the war and accept unconditional surrender.") International law at the outset of World War II did not specifically forbid the aerial bombardment of cities – despite the prior occurrence of such bombing during World War I (1914–1918), the Spanish Civil War (1936–1939), and the Second Sino-Japanese War (1937–1945).

Strategic bombing during World War II in Europe began on 1 September 1939 when Germany invaded Poland and the Luftwaffe (German Air Force) began bombing Polish cities and the civilian population in an aerial bombardment campaign. As the war continued to expand, bombing by both the Axis and the Allies increased significantly. The Royal Air Force, in retaliation for Luftwaffe attacks on the UK which started on 16 October 1939, began bombing military targets in Germany, commencing with the Luftwaffe seaplane air base at Hörnum on the 19–20 March 1940. In September 1940 the Luftwaffe began targeting British civilians in the Blitz. After the beginning of Operation Barbarossa in June 1941, the Luftwaffe attacked Soviet cities and infrastructure. From February 1942 onward, the British bombing campaign against Germany became even less restricted and increasingly targeted industrial sites and civilian areas. When the United States began flying bombing missions against Germany, it reinforced British efforts. The Allies attacked oil installations, and controversial firebombings took place against Hamburg (1943), Dresden (1945), and other German cities.

In the Pacific War, the Japanese frequently bombed civilian populations as early as 1937–1938, such as in Shanghai and Chongqing. US air raids on Japan escalated from October 1944, culminating in widespread firebombing, and later in August 1945 with the atomic bombings of Hiroshima and Nagasaki. The effectiveness of the strategic bombing campaigns is controversial. Although they did not produce decisive military victories in themselves, some argue that strategic bombing of non-military targets significantly reduced enemy industrial capacity and production, and was vindicated by the surrender of Japan. Estimates of the death toll from strategic bombing range from hundreds of thousands to over a million. Millions of civilians were made homeless, and many major cities were destroyed, especially in Europe and Asia.

== Legal considerations ==
The Hague Conventions of 1899 and 1907, which address the codes of wartime conduct on land and at sea, were adopted before the rise of air power. Despite repeated diplomatic attempts to update international humanitarian law to include aerial warfare, it was not updated before the outbreak of World War II. The absence of specific international humanitarian law did not mean aerial warfare was not covered under the laws of war, but rather that there was no general agreement of how to interpret those laws. This means that aerial bombardment of civilian areas in enemy territory by all major belligerents during World War II was not prohibited by positive or specific customary international humanitarian law.

Many reasons exist for the absence of international law regarding aerial bombing in World War II. Most nations had refused to ratify such laws or agreements because of the vague or impractical wording in treaties such as the 1923 Hague Rules of Air Warfare. Also, the major powers' possession of newly developed advanced bombers was a great military advantage; they would be hard pressed to accept any negotiated limitations regarding this new weapon. In the absence of specific laws relating to aerial warfare, the belligerents' aerial forces at the start of World War II used the 1907 Hague Conventions—signed and ratified by most major powers—as the customary standard to govern their conduct in warfare, and these conventions were interpreted by both sides to allow the indiscriminate bombing of enemy cities throughout the war.

General Telford Taylor, Chief Counsel for War Crimes at the Nuremberg Trials, wrote that:

If the first badly bombed cities—Warsaw, Rotterdam, Belgrade, and London—suffered at the hands of the Germans and not the Allies, nonetheless the ruins of German and Japanese cities were the results not of reprisal but of deliberate policy, and bore witness that aerial bombardment of cities and factories has become a recognized part of modern warfare as carried out by all nations.

Article 25 of the 1899 and 1907 Hague Conventions on Land Warfare also did not provide a clear guideline on the extent to which civilians may be spared; the same can be held for naval forces. Consequently, cyclical arguments, such as those advanced by Italian general and air power theorist Giulio Douhet, do not appear to violate any of the convention's provisions. Due to these reasons, the Allies at the Nuremberg and Tokyo Trials never criminalized aerial bombardment of non-combatant targets and Axis leaders who ordered a similar type of practice were not prosecuted. Chris Jochnick and Roger Normand in their article The Legitimation of Violence 1: A Critical History of the Laws of War explains that: "By leaving out morale bombing and other attacks on civilians unchallenged, the Tribunal conferred legal legitimacy on such practices."

== Ethical considerations ==
The concept of strategic bombing and its wide-scale implementation during WWII led to a post-war debate if it was moral. Three separate lines of ethical reasoning emerged.

The first was based on the Just War theory and emphasized that noncombatants possess an inherent right to be spared from the harm of war and should not be intentionally targeted. John C. Ford, SJ, made such an argument in an article in 1944. Noncombatant immunity and proportionality in use of force were insisted upon.

The second approach was grounded in the so-called "industrial web theory" that proposed to concentrate on destroying enemy military, industrial, and economic infrastructure instead of forces in the field as the fastest way to win the war. Proponents of this approach argued that civilian deaths inflicted by strategic bombing of the cities during the WWII were justified in the sense that they allowed a shortening of the war and thus helped to avoid many more casualties.

The third approach was demonstrated by Michael Walzer in his Just and Unjust Wars (1977). Walzer formulated the so-called "supreme emergency" thesis. While agreeing in general with prior Just War theoretical postulates, he came to a conclusion that a grave threat to a moral order would justify the use of an indiscriminate force.

Air Marshal Sir Robert Saundby concluded his analysis of the ethics of bombing by these words,

A study of the ethics of bombing cannot fail to remind one that man is an illogical creature, still far more swayed by emotion than by calm reason. Man has wonderful powers of self-deception, and of the uncritical suppression of unwelcome facts; he is still capable of believing what he wants to believe, in the face of overwhelming evidence to the contrary. Indeed, there are none so blind as will not see, or so deaf as will not hear. It is, therefore, no doubt unrealistic to hope for the general acceptance of rational views about such an emotive subject as the ethics of air bombardment.

== Europe ==
=== Policy at the start of the war ===
Before World War II began, the rapid pace of aviation technology created a belief that groups of bombers would be capable of devastating cities. For example, British Prime Minister Stanley Baldwin warned in 1932, "The bomber will always get through."

When the war began on 1 September 1939 with Germany's invasion of Poland, Franklin D. Roosevelt, President of the armed neutralitarian United States, issued an appeal to the major belligerents (Britain, France, Germany, and Poland) to confine their air raids to military targets, and "under no circumstances undertake bombardment from the air of civilian populations in unfortified cities". The British and French agreed to abide by the request, with the British reply undertaking to "confine bombardment to strictly military objectives upon the understanding that these same rules of warfare will be scrupulously observed by all their opponents". Germany also agreed to abide by Roosevelt's request and explained the bombing of Warsaw as within the agreement because it was supposedly a fortified city—Germany did not have a policy of targeting enemy civilians as part of their doctrine prior to World War II.

The British Government's policy was formulated on 31 August 1939: if Germany initiated unrestricted air action, the RAF "should attack objectives vital to Germany's war effort, and in particular her oil resources". If the Luftwaffe confined attacks to purely military targets, the RAF should "launch an attack on the German fleet at Wilhelmshaven" and "attack warships at sea when found within range". The government communicated to their French allies the intention "not to initiate air action which might involve the risk of civilian casualties".

While it was acknowledged bombing Germany would cause civilian casualties, the British government renounced deliberate bombing of civilian property, outside combat zones, as a military tactic. The British changed their policy on 15 May 1940, one day after the German bombing of Rotterdam, when the RAF was given permission to attack targets in the Ruhr Area, including oil plants and other civilian industrial targets which aided the German war effort, such as blast furnaces that at night were self-illuminating. The first RAF raid on the interior of Germany took place on the night of 15/16 May 1940 while the Battle of France was still continuing.

=== Early war in Europe ===
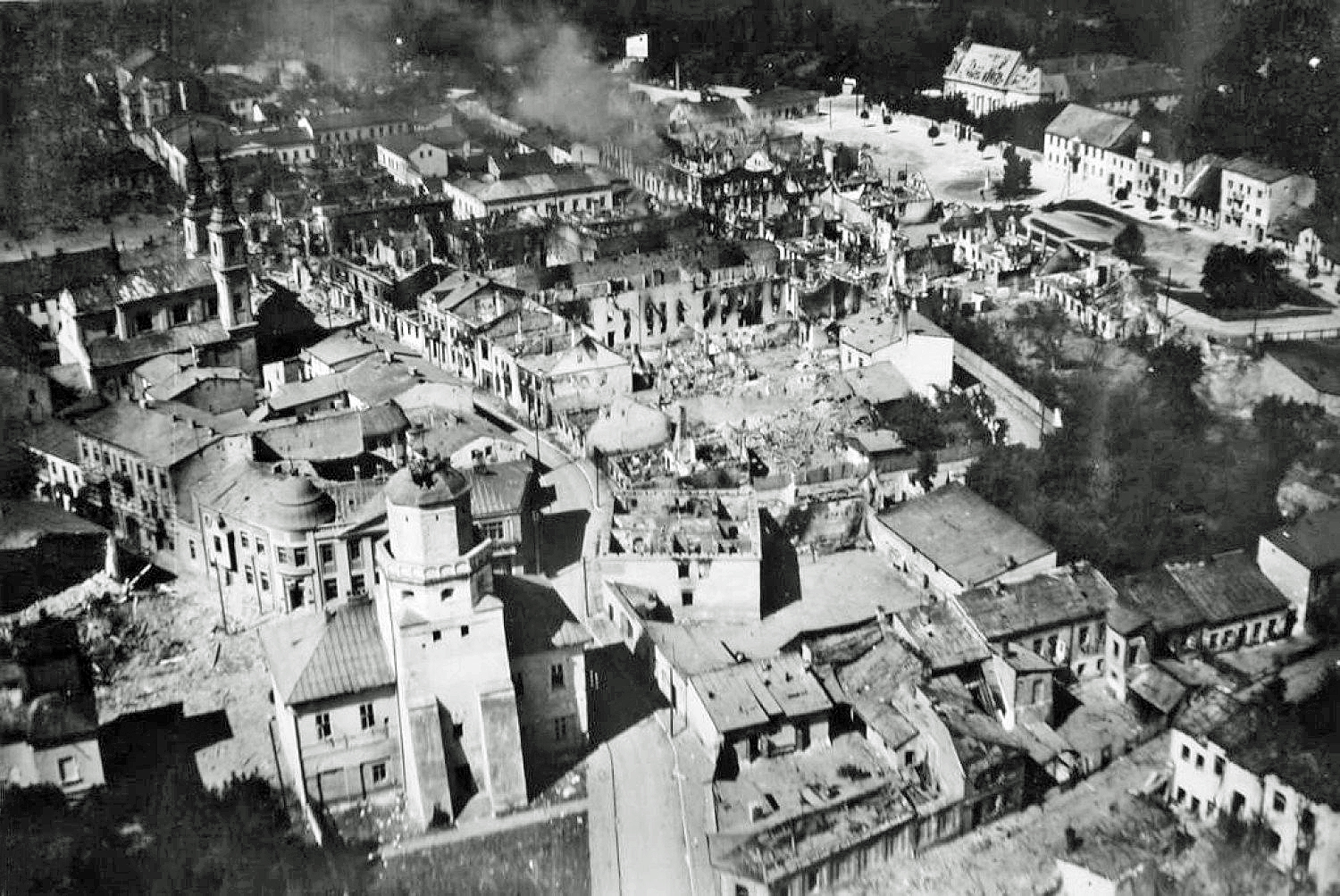
Bombing of Wieluń, the first Polish city destroyed by Luftwaffe bombing, on 1 September 1939. In one of the first acts of World War II, German bombers destroyed 70% of all the buildings, including a clearly marked hospital and church, killing approximately 127 civilians.

==== Poland ====
During the German invasion of Poland, the Luftwaffe engaged in massive air raids against Polish cities, bombing civilian infrastructure such as hospitals and targeting fleeing refugees. Notably, the Luftwaffe bombed the Polish capital of Warsaw, and the small towns Wieluń and Frampol. The bombing of Wieluń, one of the first military acts of World War II and the first major act of bombing, was carried out on a town that had little to no military value. Similarly, the bombing of Frampol has been described as an experiment to test the German tactics and weapons effectiveness. British historian Norman Davies writes in Europe at War 1939–1945: No Simple Victory: "Frampol was chosen partly because it was completely defenceless, and partly because its baroque street plan presented a perfect geometric grid for calculations and measurements."

In his book, Augen am Himmel (Eyes on the Sky), Wolfgang Schreyer wrote:

Frampol was chosen as an experimental object, because test bombers, flying at low speed, weren't endangered by AA fire. Also, the centrally placed town hall was an ideal orientation point for the crews. We watched possibility of orientation after visible signs, and also the size of village, what guaranteed that bombs nevertheless fall down on Frampol. From one side it should make easier the note of probe, from second side it should confirm the efficiency of used bombs.

The directives issued to the Luftwaffe for the Polish Campaign were to prevent the Polish Air Force from influencing the ground battles or attacking German territory. In addition, it was to support the advance of German ground forces through direct tactical and indirect air support with attacks against Polish mobilisation centres and thus delay an orderly Polish strategic concentration of forces and to deny mobility for Polish reinforcements through the destruction of strategic Polish rail routes.

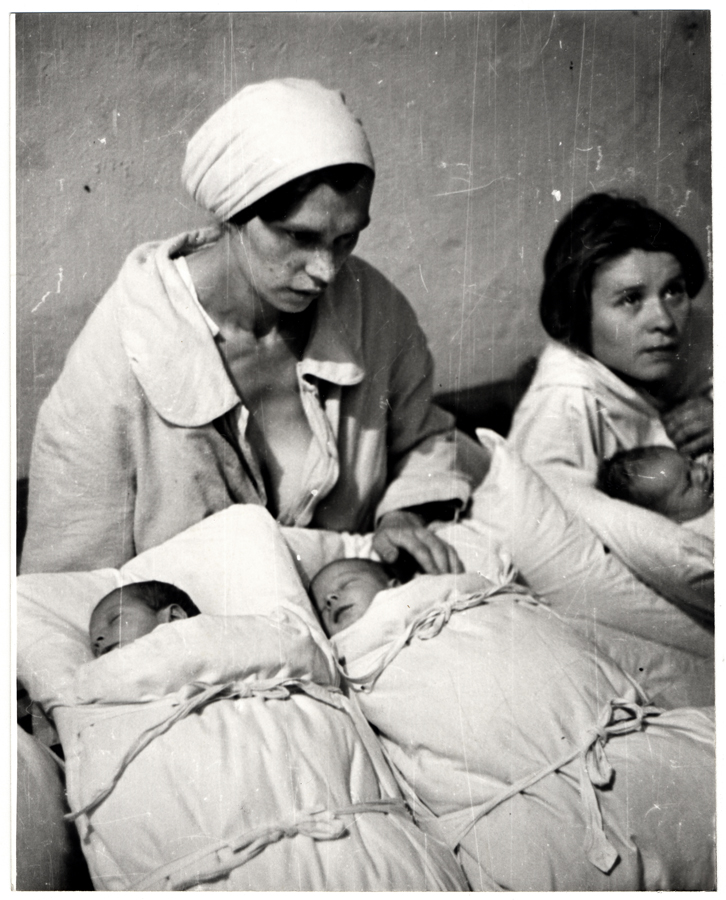
Polish mothers with their newborn infants in a makeshift maternity ward inside a hospital basement during the Bombing of Warsaw by the German Luftwaffe

Preparations were made for a concentrated attack (Operation Wasserkante) by all bomber forces against targets in Warsaw. However, the operation was cancelled, according to Polish professor Tomasz Szarota due to bad weather conditions, while German author Horst Boog claims it was possibly due to Roosevelt's plea to avoid civilian casualties; according to Boog the bombing of military and industrial targets within the Warsaw residential area called Praga was prohibited. Polish reports from the beginning of September note strafing of civilians by German attacks and bombing of cemeteries and marked hospitals (marking of hospitals proved counterproductive as German aircraft began to specifically target them, until hospitals were moved into the open to avoid such targeting), and indiscriminate attacks on fleeing civilians which according to Szarota was a direct violation of the Hague Convention. Warsaw was first attacked by German ground forces on 9 September and was put under siege on 13 September. German author Boog claims that with the arrival of German ground forces, the situation of Warsaw changed; under the Hague Convention, the city could be legitimately attacked as it was a defended city in the front line that refused calls to surrender.

The bombing of the rail network, crossroads, and troop concentrations played havoc on Polish mobilisation, while attacks upon civilian and military targets in towns and cities disrupted command and control by wrecking the antiquated Polish signal network. Over a period of a few days, Luftwaffe numerical and technological superiority took its toll on the Polish Air Force. Polish Air Force bases across Poland were also subjected to Luftwaffe bombing from 1 September 1939.

On 13 September, following orders of the Commander-in-Chief of the Luftwaffe (German Oberbefehlshaber der Luftwaffe (ObdL)) to launch an attack on Warsaw's Jewish Quarter, justified as being for unspecified crimes committed against German soldiers but probably in response to a recent defeat by Polish ground troops, and intended as a terror attack, 183 bomber sorties were flown with 50:50 load of high explosive and incendiary bombs, reportedly set the Jewish Quarter ablaze. On 22 September, Wolfram von Richthofen messaged, "Urgently request exploitation of last opportunity for large-scale experiment as devastation terror raid ... Every effort will be made to eradicate Warsaw completely". His request was rejected. However, Adolf Hitler issued an order to prevent civilians from leaving the city and to continue with the bombing, which he thought would encourage Polish surrender.

On 14 September, the French Air attaché in Warsaw reported to Paris, "the German Air Force acted in accordance to the international laws of war [...] and bombed only targets of military nature. Therefore, there is no reason for French retorsions." That day – the Jewish New Year – the Germans concentrated again on the Warsaw's Jewish population, bombing the Jewish quarter and targeting synagogues. According to professor Szarota the report was inaccurate – as its author Armengaud didn't know about the most barbaric bombings like those in Wieluń or Kamieniec, left Poland on 12 September, and was motivated by his personal political goal to avoid French involvement in the war, in addition the report published in 1948 rather than in 1939.

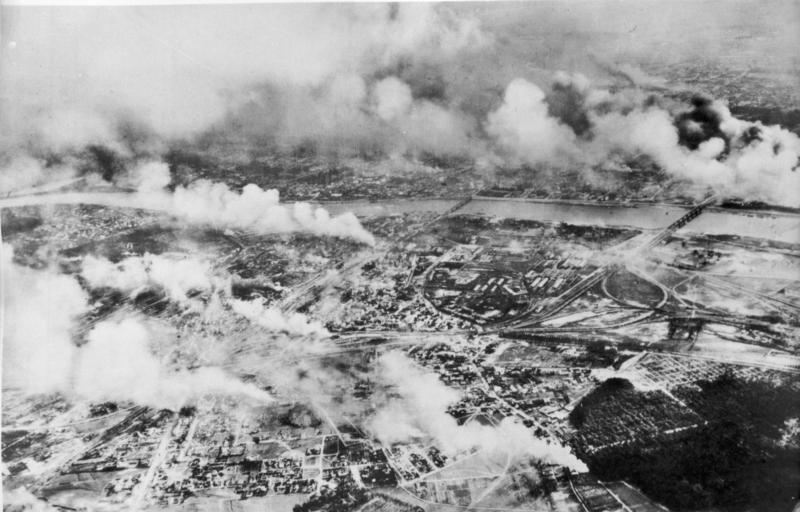
Warsaw burning after a German bombing of the city. The Luftwaffe air campaign resulted in the deaths of an estimated 20,000 – 25,000 civilians.

Three days later, Warsaw was surrounded by the Wehrmacht, and hundreds of thousands of leaflets were dropped on the city, instructing citizens to evacuate the city pending a possible bomber attack. On 25 September the Luftwaffe flew 1,150 sorties and dropped 560 tonnes of high explosive and 72 tonnes of incendiaries. (Overall, incendiaries made up only 3% of the total tonnage dropped.)

To conserve the strength of the bomber units for the upcoming Western campaign, the modern He 111 bombers were replaced by Ju 52 transports using "worse than primitive methods" for the bombing. Due to prevailing strong winds they achieved poor accuracy, even causing some casualties to besieging German troops.

The only Polish raid against a target in Germany was executed by PZL.23 Karaś light bombers against a factory in Ohlau. The Polish air force left Poland on 18 September 1939 due to the Soviet attack on 17 September 1939, and imminent capture of the Polish airstrips and aircraft stationed in eastern parts of Poland. There was no exception; even Pursuit Brigade, an organic part of the defences of the Polish capital, Warsaw, was transferred to Lublin, one week into the war.

There happened also a non-planned single bombing of the Free City of Danzig. On 7 September, at about 11 PM, a Polish Lublin R.XIII G seaplane was flying over the city, on a mission to attack the German Schleswig-Holstein battleship. However, the vessel had already left the city, so the seaplane flew over the center of Danzig, where it bombed and opened fire on the German troops celebrating the capitulation of the Polish garrison of Westerplatte.

==== The Western Front, 1939 to May 1940 ====
On 3 September 1939, following the German invasion of Poland, the United Kingdom and France declared war on Germany and the war in the West began. The RAF bombed German warships and light vessels in several harbours on 3 and 4 September. Eight German Kriegsmarine men were killed at Wilhelmshaven – the war's first casualties from British bombs; attacks on ships at Cuxhaven and Heligoland followed. The 1939 Battle of the Heligoland Bight showed the vulnerability of bombers to fighter attack.

Germany's first strikes were not carried out until 16 and 17 October 1939, against the British fleet at Rosyth and Scapa Flow. Little activity followed. Meanwhile, attacks by the Royal Air Force dwindled to less than one a month. As the winter set in, both sides engaged in propaganda warfare, dropping leaflets on the populations below. The Phoney War continued.

The British government banned attacks on land targets and German warships in port due to the risk of civilian casualties. For the Germans, the earliest directive from the Luftwaffe head Hermann Göring permitted restricted attacks upon warships anywhere, as well as upon troop transports at sea. However, Hitler's OKW Direktive Nr 2 and Luftwaffe Direktive Nr 2, prohibited attacks upon enemy naval forces unless the enemy bombed Germany first, noting, "the guiding principle must be not to provoke the initiation of aerial warfare on the part of Germany."

After the Altmark incident, the Luftwaffe launched a strike against the British navy base at Scapa Flow on 16 March 1940, leading to the first British civilian death. A British attack followed three days later against the German airbase at Hörnum on the island of Sylt, hitting a hospital, although there were no casualties. The Germans retaliated with a naval raid.

German bombing of France began on the night of 9/10 May. By 11 May, the French reported bombs dropped on Henin-Lietard, Bruay, Lens, La Fere, Loan, Nancy, Colmar, Pontoise, Lambersart, Lyons, Bouai, Hasebrouck, Doullens and Abbeville with at least 40 civilians killed.

While Allied light and medium bombers attempted to delay the German invasion by striking at troop columns and bridges, the British War Cabinet gave permission for limited bombing raids against targets such as roads and railways west of the Rhine River.

==== Rotterdam Blitz ====
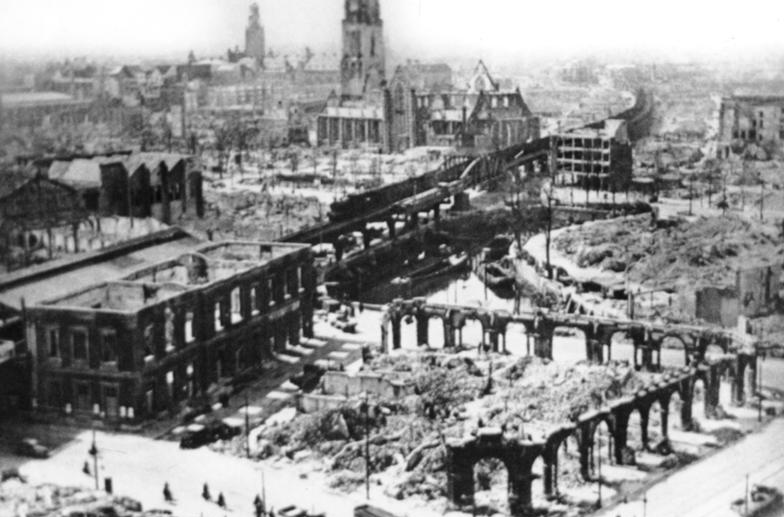
View of Rotterdam after the German bombing of the city

The Germans used the threat of bombing Rotterdam, the Netherlands, to try to get the Dutch to come to terms and surrender. After a second ultimatum had been issued by the Germans, it appeared their effort had failed and on 14 May 1940, Luftwaffe bombers were ordered to bomb Rotterdam in an effort to force the capitulation of the besieged city. The controversial bombing targeted the centre of the besieged city, instead of providing direct tactical support for the hard-pressed German 22nd Infantry Division (under Lt. Gen. von Sponeck, which had airlanded on 10 May) in combat with Dutch forces northwest of the city, and in the eastern part of the city at the Meuse river bridge. At the last minute, the Netherlands decided to submit and sent a plenipotentiary and other negotiators across to German lines. There was an attempt to call off the assault, but the bombing mission had already begun. In legal terms, the attack was performed against a defended part of a city vital for the military objectives and in the front-line, and the bombing respected Article 25 to 27 of the Hague Conventions on Land Warfare.

Out of 100 Heinkel He 111s, 57 dropped their ordnance, a combined 97 tons of bombs. In the resulting fire 2.8 square kilometres (1.1 sq mi) of the city centre were devastated, including 21 churches and 4 hospitals. The strike killed between 800 and 1,000 civilians, wounded over 1,000, and made 78,000 homeless. In 2022, archival research showed a total of 1,150 to 1,250 civilians, and Dutch army and Nazi army personnel were killed during the Rotterdam Blitz. Nearly twenty-five thousand homes, 2,320 stores, 775 warehouses and 62 schools were destroyed.

Whilst German historian Horst Boog says British propaganda inflated the number of civilian casualties by a factor of 30, contemporary newspaper reports show the Dutch legation in Paris initially estimated 100,000 people were killed, the Dutch legation in New York later issued a revised figure of 30,000. International news agencies widely reported these figures, portraying Rotterdam as a city mercilessly destroyed by terror bombing without regard for civilian life, with 30,000 dead lying under the ruins. It has been argued that the bombing was against well-defined targets, albeit in the middle of the city, and would have assisted the advancing German Army. The Germans had threatened to bomb Utrecht in the same fashion, and the Netherlands surrendered.

==== Allied response ====
Following the attack on Rotterdam, RAF Bomber Command was authorized to attack German targets east of the Rhine on 15 May 1940; the Air Ministry authorized Air Marshal Charles Portal to attack targets in the Ruhr, including oil plants and other civilian industrial targets which aided the German war effort, such as blast furnaces. The underlying motive for the attacks was to divert German air forces away from the land front. Churchill explained the rationale of his decision to his French counterparts in a letter dated the 16th: "I have examined today with the War Cabinet and all the experts the request which you made to me last night and this morning for further fighter squadrons. We are all agreed that it is better to draw the enemy on to this Island by striking at his vitals, and thus to aid the common cause." Due to the inadequate British bomb-sights the strikes that followed "had the effect of terror raids on towns and villages." On the night of 15/16 May, 96 bombers crossed the Rhine and attacked targets in Gelsenkirchen. 78 had been assigned oil targets, but only 24 claimed to have accomplished their objective.

On the night of 17/18 May, RAF Bomber Command bombed oil installations in Hamburg and Bremen; the H.E. and 400 incendiaries dropped caused six large, one moderately large and twenty-nine small fires. As a result of the attack, 47 people were killed and 127 were wounded. Railway yards at Cologne were attacked on the same night. During May, Essen, Duisburg, Düsseldorf and Hanover were attacked in a similar fashion by Bomber Command. In June, attacks were made on Dortmund, Mannheim, Frankfurt and Bochum. At the time, Bomber Command lacked the necessary navigational and bombing technical background and the accuracy of the bombings during the night attacks was abysmal. Consequently, the bombs were usually scattered over a large area, causing an uproar in Germany. On the night of 7/8 June 1940 a single French Navy Farman F.223 aircraft bombed Berlin, the first Allied attack on the capital.

Despite the British attacks on German cities, the Luftwaffe did not begin to attack military and economic targets in the UK until six weeks after the campaign in France was concluded.

==== The Battle of Britain and the Blitz ====
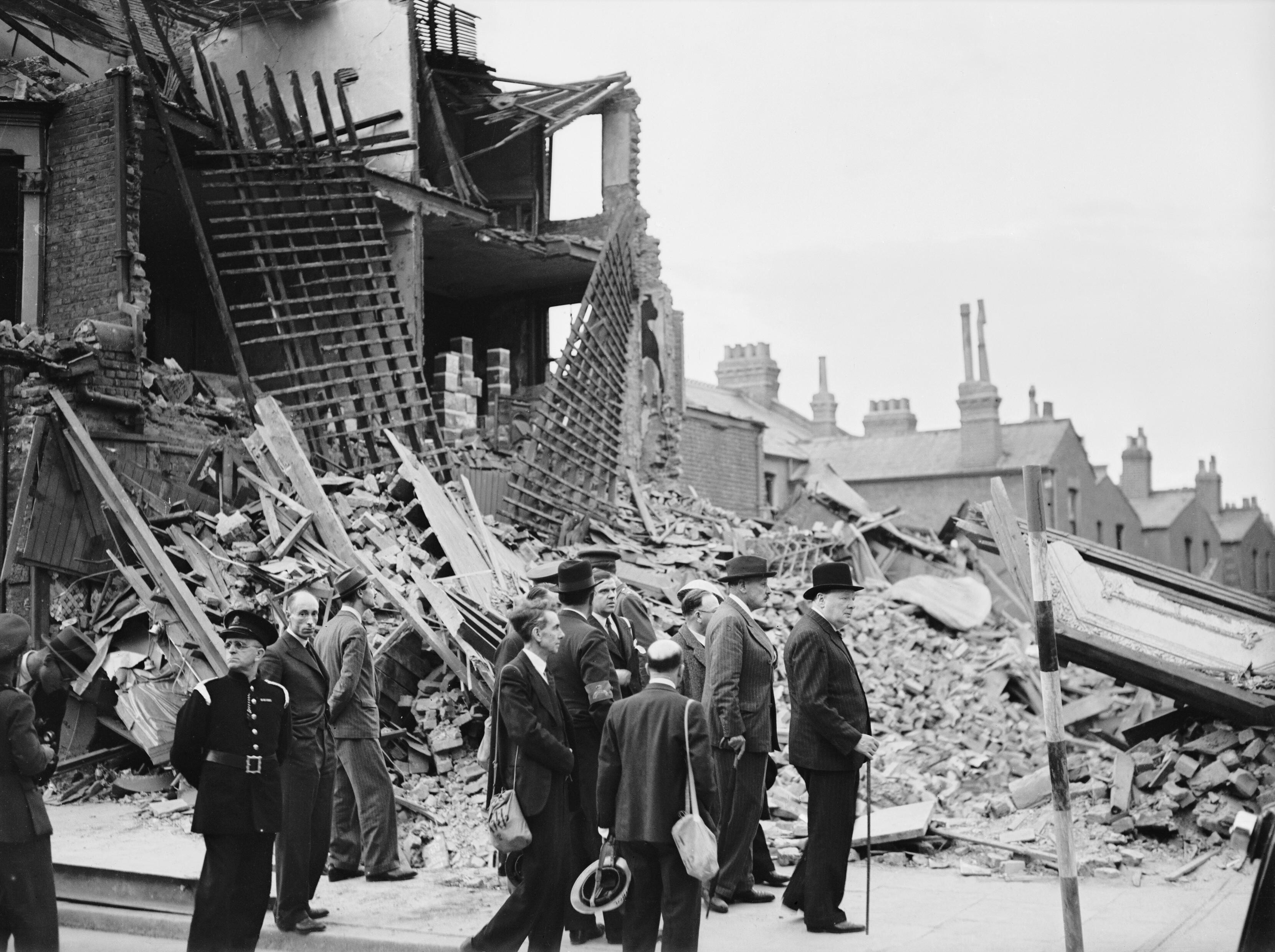
Winston Churchill visiting bomb-damaged areas of the East End of London on 8 September 1940

On 22 June 1940, France signed an armistice with Germany. Britain was determined to keep fighting. On 1 and 2 July, the British attacked the German warships Scharnhorst and Prinz Eugen in the port of Kiel and the next day, 16 RAF bombers attacked German train facilities in Hamm.

The Battle of Britain began in early June 1940 with small scale bombing raids on Britain. These Störangriffe ("nuisance raids") were used to train bomber crews in both day and night attacks, to test defences and try out methods. These training flights continued through July and August, and into the first week of September. Hermann Göring's general order, issued on 30 June 1940, stated:

The war against England is to be restricted to destructive attacks against industry and air force targets which have weak defensive forces. ... The most thorough study of the target concerned, that is vital points of the target, is a pre-requisite for success. It is also stressed that every effort should be made to avoid unnecessary loss of life amongst the civilian population.

— Hermann Göring

The Kanalkampf of attacks on shipping and fighter skirmishes over the English Channel started on 4 July, and escalated on 10 July, a day which Dowding later proposed as the official start date for the Battle. Throughout the battle, Hitler called for the British to accept peace, but they refused to negotiate.

Still hoping that the British would negotiate for peace, Hitler explicitly prohibited attacks on London and against civilians. Any airmen who, intentionally or unintentionally, violated this order were punished. Hitler's No. 17 Directive, issued 1 August 1940, established the conduct of war against Britain and specifically forbade the Luftwaffe from conducting terror raids. The Führer declared that terror attacks could only be a means of reprisal, as ordered by him.

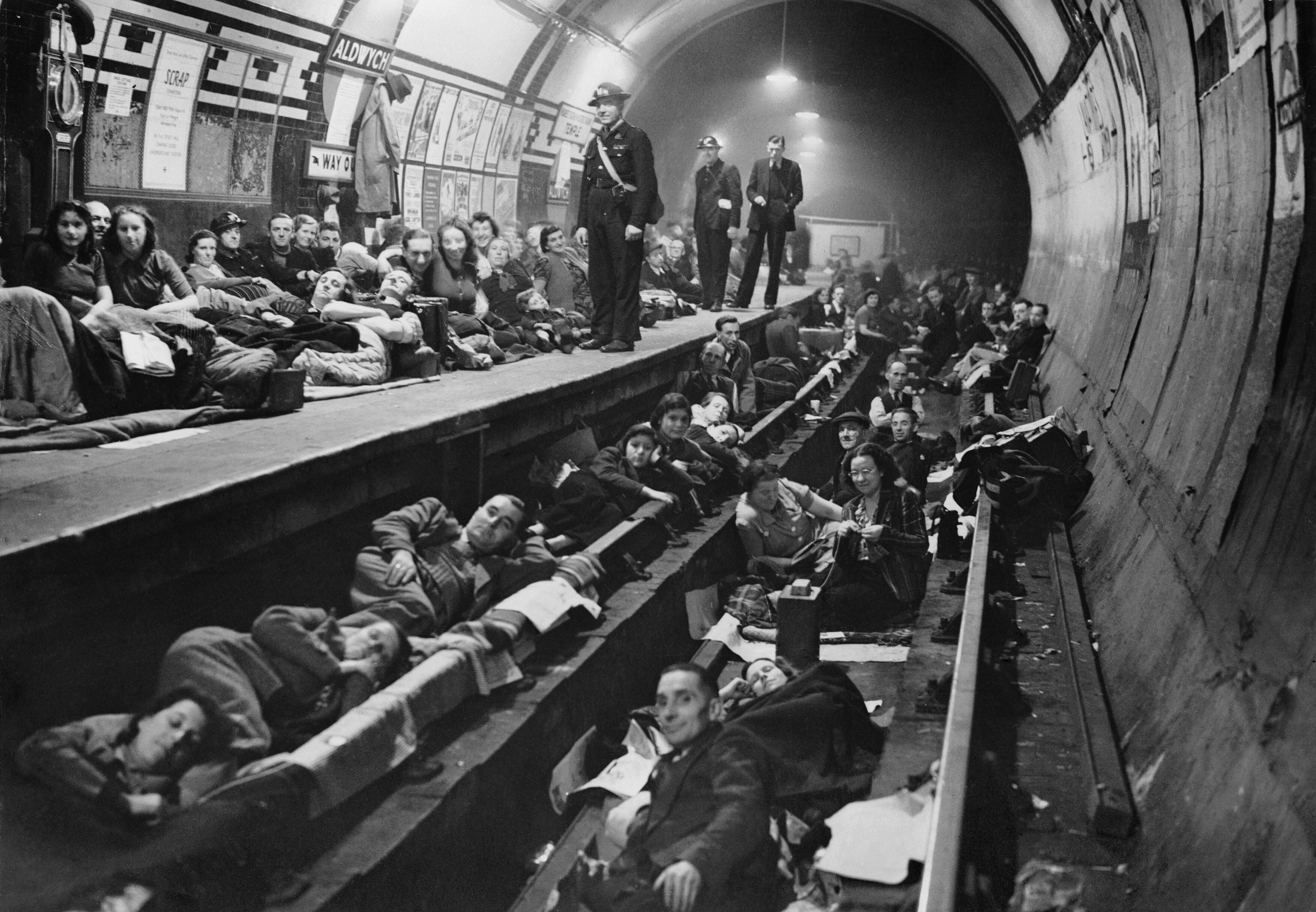
Aldwych tube station being used as a bomb shelter in 1940

On 6 August Göring finalised plans for "Operation Eagle Attack" with his commanders: destruction of RAF Fighter Command across the south of England was to take four days, then bombing of military and economic targets was to systematically extend up to the Midlands until daylight attacks could proceed unhindered over the whole of Britain, then a major attack was to be made on London causing a crisis with refugees when the intended Operation Sea Lion invasion was due to begin. On 8 August 1940, the Germans switched to raids on RAF fighter bases. To reduce losses, the Luftwaffe also began to use increasing numbers of bombers at night. From the night of 19/20 August night bombing targeted the aircraft industry, ports, harbours, and other strategic targets in towns and cities, including suburban areas around London. By the last week of August, over half the missions were flown under the cover of dark. On 24 August, several off-course German bombers accidentally bombed central areas of London. The next day, the RAF bombed Berlin for the first time, targeting Tempelhof airfield and the Siemens factories in Siemenstadt. These attacks were seen by the Germans as indiscriminate due to their inaccuracy, and this infuriated Hitler; he ordered that the 'night piracy of the British' be countered by a concentrated night offensive against the island, and especially London. In a public speech in Berlin on 4 September 1940, Hitler announced that:

The other night the English had bombed Berlin. So be it. But this is a game at which two can play. When the British Air Force drops 2000 or 3000 or 4000 kg of bombs, then we will drop 150 000, 180 000, 230 000, 300 000, 400 000 kg on a single night. When they declare they will attack our cities in great measure, we will eradicate their cities. The hour will come when one of us will break – and it will not be National Socialist Germany!

— Adolf Hitler

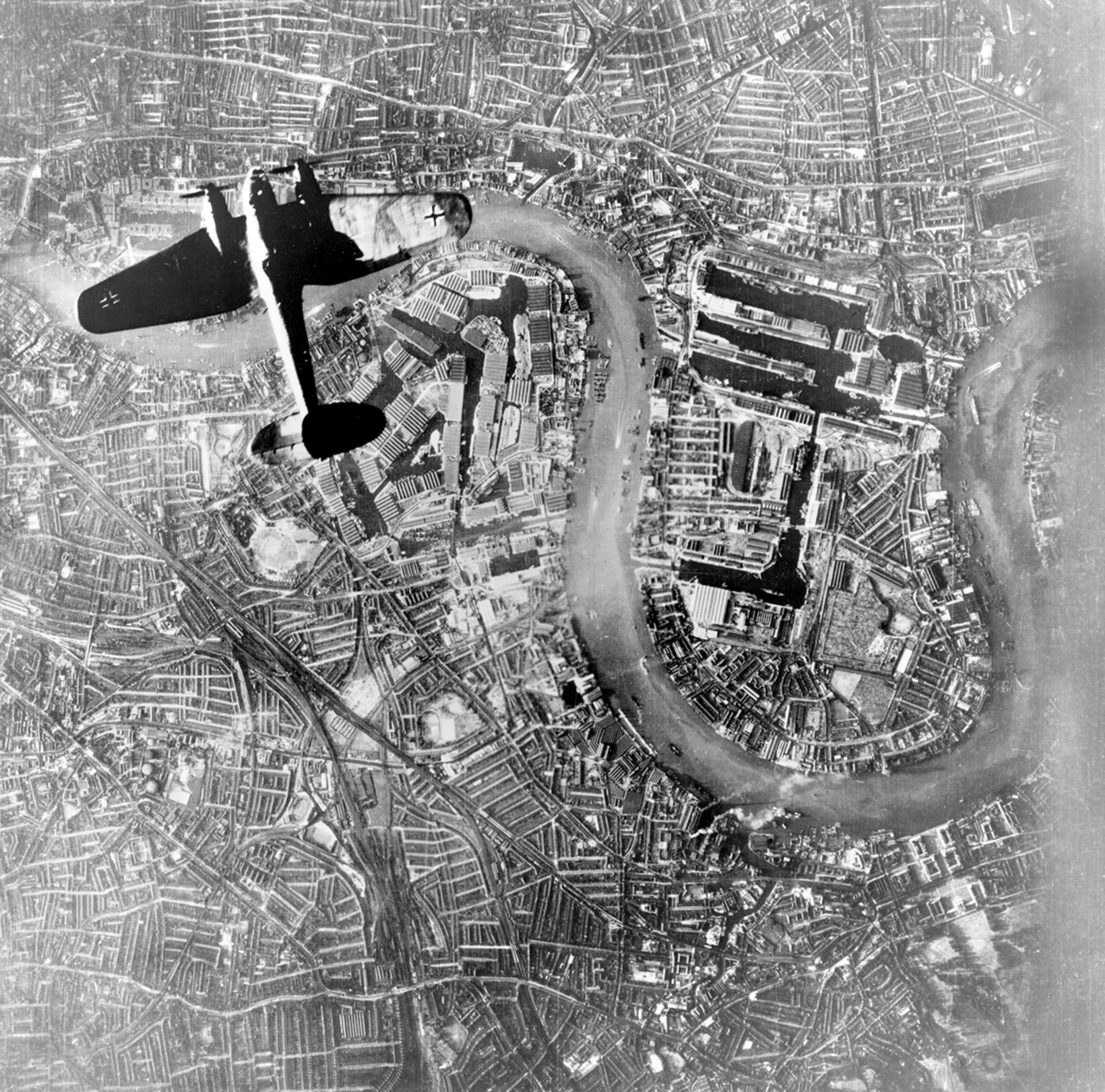
German Luftwaffe Heinkel He 111 bomber flying over Wapping and the Isle of Dogs in the East End of London at the start of the Luftwaffe's evening raids of 7 September 1940

The Blitz was underway. Göring – at Kesselring's urging and with Hitler's support – turned to a massive assault on the British capital. On 7 September 318 bombers from the whole KG 53 supported by eight other Kampfgruppen, flew almost continuous sorties against London, the dock area which was already in flames from earlier daylight attacks. The attack of 7 September 1940 did not entirely step over the line into a clear terror bombing effort since its primary target was the London docks, but there was clearly an assumed hope of terrorizing the London population. Hitler himself hoped that the bombing of London would terrorize the population into submission. He stated that "If eight million [Londoners] go mad, it might very well turn into a catastrophe!". After that he believed "even a small invasion might go a long way". Another 250 bomber sorties were flown in the night. By the morning of 8 September 430 Londoners had been killed. The Luftwaffe issued a press notice announcing they had dropped more than 1,000,000 kilograms (1,100 short tons) of bombs on London in 24 hours. Many other British cities were hit in the nine-month Blitz, including Plymouth, Swansea, Birmingham, Sheffield, Liverpool, Southampton, Manchester, Bristol, Belfast, Cardiff, Clydebank, Kingston upon Hull and Coventry. Basil Collier, author of 'The Defence of the United Kingdom', the HMSO's official history, wrote:

Although the plan adopted by the Luftwaffe early in September had mentioned attacks on the population of large cities, detailed records of the raids made during the autumn and the winter of 1940–41 do not suggest that indiscriminate bombing of civilians was intended. The points of aim selected were largely factories and docks. Other objectives specifically allotted to bomber-crews included the City of London and the governmental quarter round Whitehall.

In addition to the conclusions of Basil Collier to that effect there are also, for example, the 1949 memoirs of General Henry H. Arnold who had been in London in 1941 and supported Collier's estimate. Harris noted in 1947 that the Germans had failed to take the opportunity to destroy English cities by concentrated incendiary bombing.

As the war continued, an escalating war of electronic technology developed. To counter German radio navigation aids, which helped their navigators find targets in the dark and through cloud cover, the British raced to work out the problems with countermeasures (most notably airborne radar, as well as highly effective deceptive beacons and jammers).

Despite causing a great deal of damage and disrupting the daily lives of the civilian population, the bombing of Britain failed to have an impact. British air defenses became more formidable, and attacks tapered off as Germany abandoned its efforts against Britain and focused more on the Soviet Union.

Operation Abigail Rachel, the bombing of Mannheim, was one of the first revenge bombings by the British against a German city on 16 December. The British had been waiting for the opportunity to experiment with such a raid aimed at creating a maximum of destruction in a selected town since the summer of 1940, and the opportunity was given after the German raid on Coventry. Internally it was declared to be a reprisal for Coventry and Southampton. The new bombing policy was officially ordered by Churchill at the start of December, on condition it receive no publicity and be considered an experiment. Target marking and most bombs missed the city centre. This led to the development of the bomber stream. Despite the lack of decisive success of this raid, approval was granted for further Abigails.

This was the start of a British drift away from precision attacks on military targets and towards area bombing attacks on whole cities.

=== Germany later in the war ===
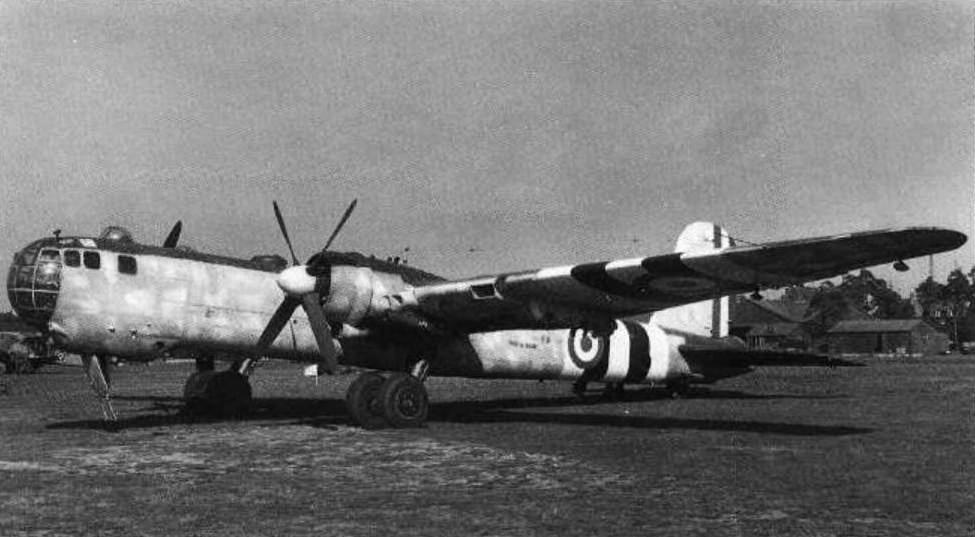
A captured Heinkel He 177A in French Armee de l'Air colours in 1945.

Goering's first chief of staff, Generalleutnant Walther Wever, was a big advocate of the Ural bomber program, but when he died in a flying accident in 1936, support for the strategic bomber program began to dwindle rapidly under Goering's influence. Under pressure from Goering, Albert Kesselring, Wever's replacement, opted for a medium, all-purpose, twin-engine tactical bomber. Erhard Milch, who strongly supported Goering's conceptions, was instrumental in the Luftwaffe's future. Milch believed that the German industry (in terms of raw materials and production capacity) could only produce 1,000 four-engine heavy bombers per year, but many times that number of twin-engine bombers. In spring of 1937, just when the Luftwaffe's own Technical Office had passed the Ju-89 and Do-19 heavy bomber models as ready for testing, Goering ordered a halt to all work on the four-engine strategic bomber program.

However, in 1939 the Bomber B program sought to produce a twin-engined strategic bomber that could carry nearly-equivalent bombloads of Allied four-engined heavy bombers, but as an advanced development of the pre-war Schnellbomber concept. The Bomber B designs meant to achieve top level speeds of at least 600 km/h (370 mph). The Bomber B program went nowhere, as the intended designs required pairs of combat-reliable aviation engines of at least 1,500 kW (2,000 PS) apiece, something that the German aviation engine industry had serious problems in developing. A further design program was initiated in the late spring of 1942, to develop four-engine (and later six-engine) bombers with trans-Atlantic range to attack the continental United States and aptly named the Amerika Bomber. This also went nowhere, with only five prototype airframes from two design competitors getting airborne for testing, before the war's end.

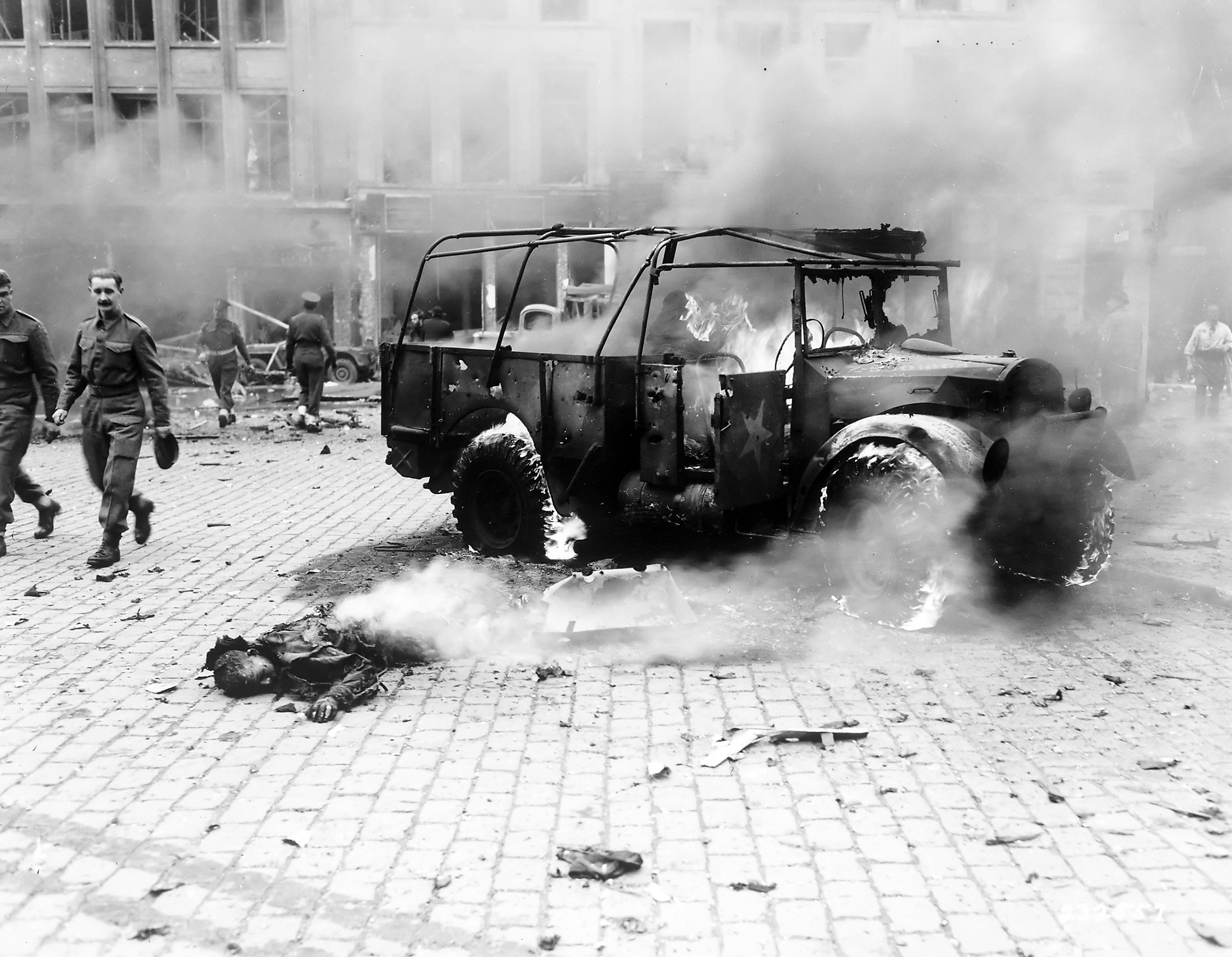
One of the victims of a German V-2 rocket that struck Teniers Square, Antwerp, Belgium on 27 November 1944

The only heavy bomber design to see service with the Luftwaffe in World War II was the trouble-prone Heinkel He 177A. In the initial design of November 1937, the RLM had mistakenly decided that the He 177 should also have a medium angle "dive bombing" capability. Ernst Heinkel and Milch vehemently disagreed with this, but the requirement was not rescinded until September 1942 by Goering himself. The He 177A went into service in April 1942, despite an ongoing series of engine fires in the small batch of A-0 series production prototype aircraft. This deficiency, along with numerous, seriously deficient design features, led Goering to decry the He 177A's Daimler-Benz DB 606 powerplants to be nothing more than fire-prone, cumbersome "welded-together engines" in August of that year. Production of the B-series by Heinkel's only subcontractor for the Greif, Arado Flugzeugwerke, would not have started until November 1944, because of Arado's focus on the production of its own Arado Ar 234 jet-powered reconnaissance-bomber at the time. The July 1944-initiated Emergency Fighter Program (Jägernotprogramm), as well as the devastating effects of Allied bombing on the entire German aviation industry, prevented any production of the He 177B design.

The He 177A entered service in April 1942. At this time, after a destructive RAF attack on Lübeck, Adolf Hitler ordered the Luftwaffe to retaliate with the so-called Baedeker Blitz:

The Führer has ordered that the air war against England be given a more aggressive stamp. Accordingly, when targets are being selected, preference is to be given to those where attacks are likely to have the greatest possible effect on civilian life. Besides raids on ports and industry, terror attacks of retaliatory nature are to be carried out against towns other than London. Minelaying is to be scaled down in favour of these attacks.

— Signal from the Führer's headquarters to the Luftwaffe High Command, 14 April 1942.

In January 1944, a beleaguered Germany tried to strike a blow to British morale with terror bombing with Operation Steinbock, nicknamed the "Baby Blitz" by the British. At this stage of the war, Germany was critically short of heavy and medium bombers, with the added obstacles of a highly effective and sophisticated British air-defence system, and the increasing vulnerability of airfields in occupied Western Europe to Allied air attack making the effectiveness of German retaliation more doubtful.

British historian Frederick Taylor asserts that "all sides bombed each other's cities during the war. Half a million Soviet citizens, for example, died from German bombing during the invasion and occupation of Russia. That's roughly equivalent to the number of German citizens who died from Allied raids." (Note: British historian Richard Overy considers this order of magnitude to be "a rhetorical statistic, to demonstrate the level of sacrifice of the Soviet people and the wickedness of the German enemy". The figure "bears no relation to the detailed wartime documentary evidence". A much lower figure (51,526) is borne out by such evidence and "is much more consistent with the nature of the German bombing effort and the declining capability of the German bomber force as it struggled to sustain support for the ground war with dwindling resources".) The Luftwaffe destroyed numerous Soviet cities through bombing, including Minsk, Sevastopol, and Stalingrad. 20,528 tons of bombs were dropped on Sevastopol in June 1942 alone. German bombing efforts on the Eastern Front dwarfed its commitments in the west. From 22 June 1941 to 30 April 1944, the Luftwaffe dropped 756,773 tonnes of bombs on the Eastern Front, a monthly average of 22,000 tonnes. German scientists had invented vengeance weapons – V-1 flying bombs and V-2 ballistic missiles – and these were used to launch an aerial assault on London and other cities in southern England from continental Europe. The campaign was much less destructive than the Blitz. As the Allies advanced across France and towards Germany from the West, Paris, Liège, Lille, and Antwerp also became targets.

The British and US directed part of their strategic bombing effort to the eradication of "wonder weapon" threats in what was later known as Operation Crossbow. The development of the V2 was hit preemptively in Operation Hydra of August 1943 against Peenemunde research facility.

=== The British later in the war ===
RAF estimates of destruction of "built up areas" of major German cities Bold* = population over 500,000
| City | percent destroyed |
|---|---|
| Berlin* | 33% |
| Cologne* | 61% |
| Dortmund* | 54% |
| Dresden* | 59% |
| Düsseldorf* | 64% |
| Essen* | 50% |
| Frankfurt* | 52% |
| Hamburg* | 75% |
| Leipzig* | 20% |
| Munich* | 42% |
| Bochum | 83% |
| Bremen | 62% |
| Chemnitz | 41% |
| Dessau | 61% |
| Duisburg | 48% |
| Hagen | 67% |
| Hanover | 60% |
| Kassel | 69% |
| Kiel | 50% |
| Mainz | 80% |
| Magdeburg | 41% |
| Mannheim | 64% |
| Nuremberg | 51% |
| Stettin | 53% |
| Stuttgart | 46% |

The purpose of the area bombardment of cities was laid out in a British Air Staff paper, dated 23 September 1941:

The ultimate aim of an attack on a town area is to break the morale of the population which occupies it. To ensure this, we must achieve two things: first, we must make the town physically uninhabitable and, secondly, we must make the people conscious of constant personal danger. The immediate aim, is therefore, twofold, namely, to produce (i) destruction and (ii) fear of death.

During the first few months of the area bombing campaign, an internal debate within the British government about the most effective use of the nation's limited resources in waging war on Germany continued. Should the Royal Air Force (RAF) be scaled back to allow more resources to go to the British Army and Royal Navy or should the strategic bombing option be followed and expanded? An influential paper was presented to support the bombing campaign by Professor Frederick Lindemann, the British government's leading scientific adviser, justifying the use of area bombing to "dehouse" the German workforce as the most effective way of reducing their morale and affecting enemy war production.

Mr. Justice Singleton, a High Court Judge, was asked by the cabinet to look into the competing points of view. In his report, delivered on 20 May 1942, he concluded:

If Russia can hold Germany on land I doubt whether Germany will stand 12 or 18 months' continuous, intensified and increased bombing, affecting, as it must, her war production, her power of resistance, her industries and her will to resist (by which I mean morale).

In the end, thanks in part to the dehousing paper, it was this view which prevailed and Bomber Command would remain an important component of the British war effort up to the end of World War II. A large proportion of the industrial production of the United Kingdom was harnessed to the task of creating a vast fleet of heavy bombers. Until 1944, the effect on German production was remarkably small and raised doubts whether it was wise to divert so much effort—the response being there was nowhere else the effort could have been applied, as readily, to greater effect.

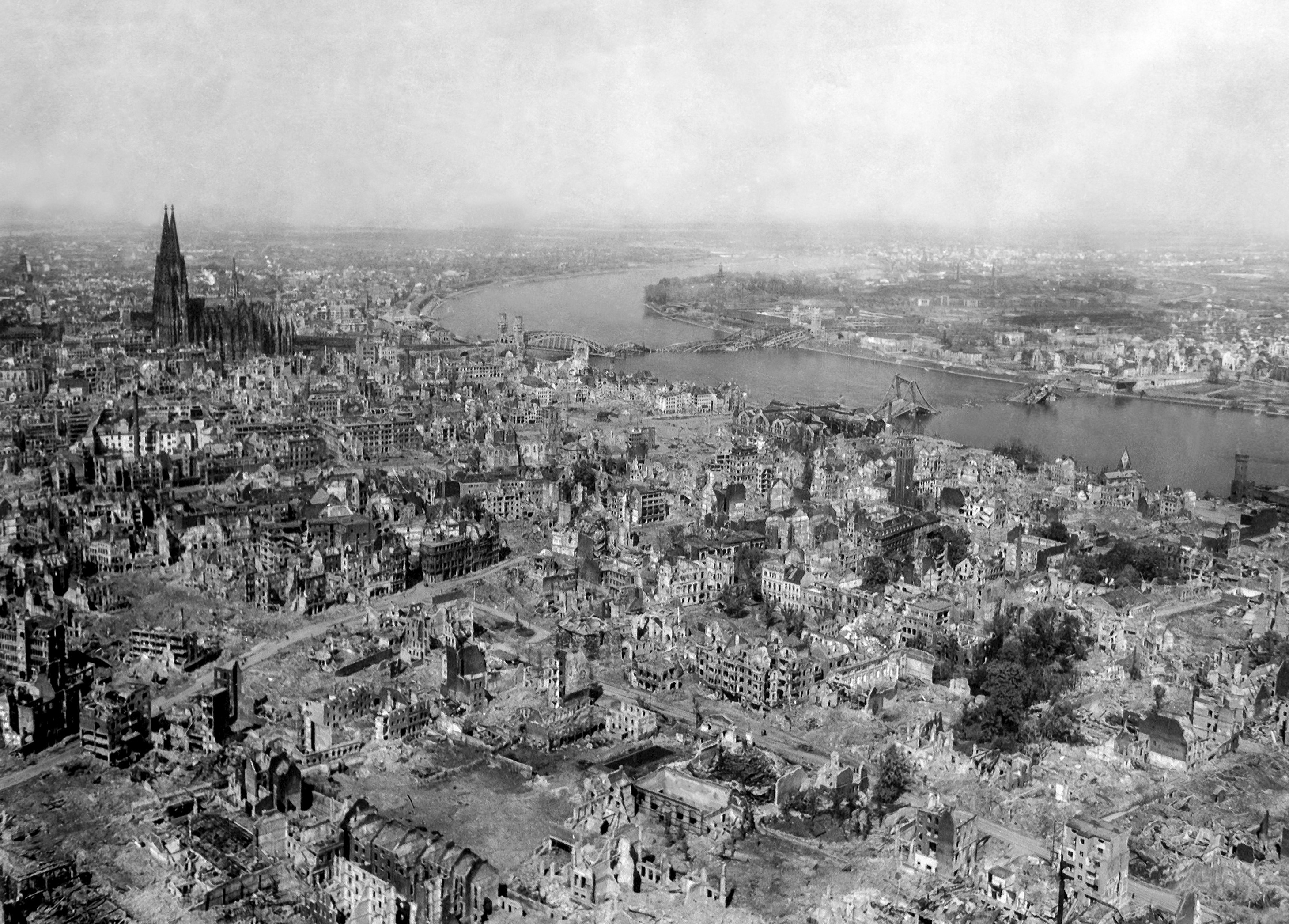
Cologne in 1945; despite being hit dozens of times by Allied bombs, the Cologne Cathedral survived the war.

Lindemann was liked and trusted by Winston Churchill, who appointed him the British government's leading scientific adviser with a seat in the Cabinet. In 1942, Lindemann presented the "dehousing paper" to the Cabinet showing the effect that intensive bombing of German cities could produce. It was accepted by the Cabinet, and Air Marshal Harris was appointed to carry out the task. It became an important part of the total war waged against Germany. Professor Lindemann's paper put forward the theory of attacking major industrial centres in order to deliberately destroy as many homes and houses as possible. Working-class homes were to be targeted because they had a higher density and fire storms were more likely. This would displace the German workforce and reduce their ability to work. His calculations (which were questioned at the time, in particular by Professor P. M. S. Blackett of the Admiralty operations research department, expressly refuting Lindemann's conclusions) showed the RAF's Bomber Command would be able to destroy the majority of German houses located in cities quite quickly. The plan was highly controversial even before it started, but the Cabinet thought that bombing was the only option available to directly attack Germany (as a major invasion of the continent was almost two years away), and the Soviets were demanding that the Western Allies do something to relieve the pressure on the Eastern Front. Few in Britain opposed this policy, but there were three notable opponents in Parliament, Bishop George Bell and the Labour MPs Richard Stokes and Alfred Salter.

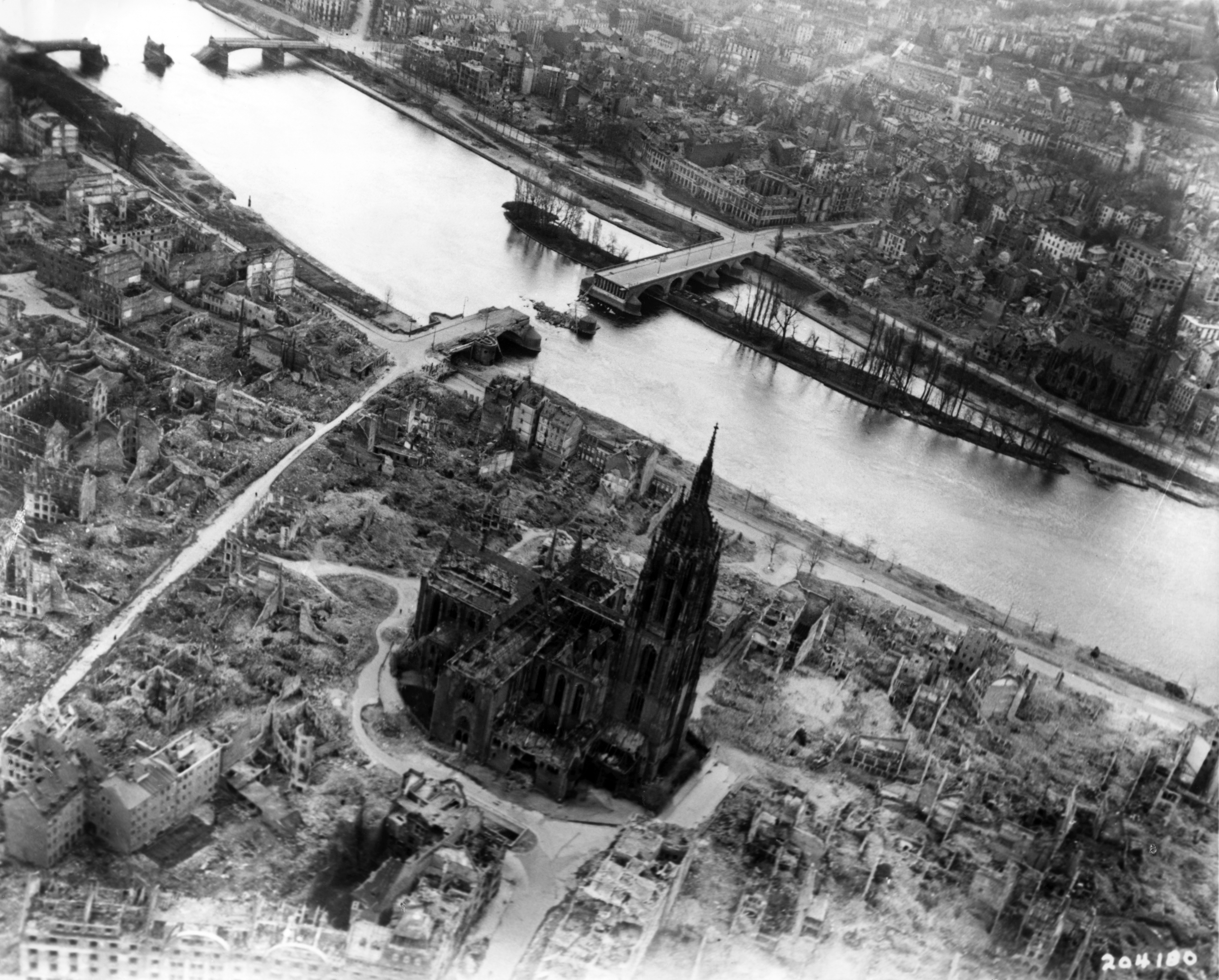
The area near the Frankfurt Cathedral after a bombing, March 1945

On 14 February 1942, the area bombing directive was issued to Bomber Command. Bombing was to be "focused on the morale of the enemy civil population and in particular of the industrial workers." Though it was never explicitly declared, this was the nearest that the British got to a declaration of unrestricted aerial bombing – Directive 22 said "You are accordingly authorised to use your forces without restriction", and then listing a series of primary targets which included Dortmund, Essen, Duisburg, Düsseldorf, and Cologne. Secondary targets included Braunschweig, Lübeck, Rostock, Bremen, Kiel, Hanover, Frankfurt, Mannheim, Stuttgart, and Schweinfurt. The directive stated that "operations should now be focused on the morale of the enemy civilian population, and in particular, the industrial workers". Lest there be any confusion, Sir Charles Portal wrote to Air Chief Marshal Norman Bottomley on 15 February,

I suppose it is clear that the aiming points will be the built-up areas, and not, for instance, the dockyards or aircraft factories [...].

The first true practical demonstrations were on the night of 28 to 29 March 1942, when 234 aircraft bombed the port of Lübeck. This target was chosen not because it was a significant military target, but because it was expected to be particularly susceptible – in Harris's words it was "built more like a fire lighter than a city". The old timber structures burned well, and the raid destroyed most of the city's centre. A few days later, Rostock suffered the same fate.

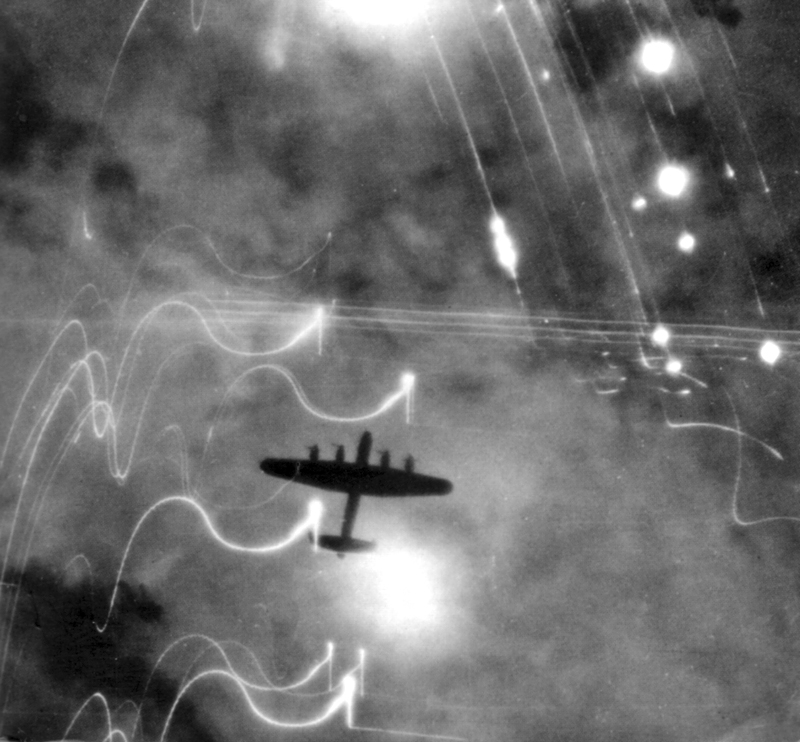
An Avro Lancaster over Hamburg

At this stage of the air war, the most effective and disruptive examples of area bombing were the "thousand-bomber raids". Bomber Command was able by organization and drafting in as many aircraft as possible to assemble very large forces which could then attack a single area, overwhelming the defences. The aircraft would be staggered so that they would arrive over the target in succession: the new technique of the "bomber stream".

On 30 May 1942, between 0047 and 0225 hours, in Operation Millennium 1,046 bombers dropped over 2,000 tons of high explosive and incendiaries on Cologne, and the resulting fires burned it from end to end. The damage inflicted was extensive. The fires could be seen 1,000 kilometres (600 mi) away at an altitude of 20,000 feet. Some 3,300 houses were destroyed, and 10,000 were damaged. 12,000 separate fires raged destroying 36 factories, damaging 270 more, and leaving 45,000 people with nowhere to live or to work. Only 384 civilians and 85 soldiers were killed, but thousands evacuated the city. Bomber Command lost 40 bombers.

Two further thousand-bomber raids were conducted over Essen and Bremen, but neither so utterly shook both sides as the scale of the destruction at Cologne and Hamburg. The effects of the massive raids using a combination of blockbuster bombs (to blow off roofs) and incendiaries (to start fires in the exposed buildings) created firestorms in some cities. The most extreme examples of which were caused by Operation Gomorrah, the combined USAAF/RAF attack on Hamburg, (45,000 dead), attack on Kassel (10,000 dead), the attack on Darmstadt (12,500 dead), the attack on Pforzheim (21,200 dead), the attack on Swinemuende (23,000 dead) and the attack on Dresden (25,000 dead).

According to economic historian Adam Tooze, in his book The Wages of Destruction: The Making and Breaking of the Nazi Economy, a turning point in the bomber offensive was reached in March 1943, during the Battle of the Ruhr. Over five months, 34,000 tons of bombs were dropped. Following the raids, steel production fell by 200,000 tons, making a shortfall of 400,000 tons. Speer acknowledged that the RAF were hitting the right targets, and raids severely disrupted his plans to increase production to meet increasing attritional needs. Between July 1943 and March 1944 there were no further increases in the output of aircraft.

The bombing of Hamburg in 1943 also produced impressive results. Attacks on Tiger I heavy tank production, and of that of 88 mm guns, the most potent dual-purpose artillery piece in the Wehrmacht, meant that output of both was "set back for months". On top of this, some 62% of the population was dehoused causing more difficulties. However, RAF Bomber Command allowed itself to be distracted by Harris' desire for a war winning blow, and attempted the fruitless missions to destroy Berlin and end the war by spring, 1944.

In October 1943, Harris urged the government to be honest with the public regarding the purpose of the bombing campaign. To Harris, his complete success at Hamburg confirmed the validity and necessity of his methods, and he urged that:

the aim of the Combined Bomber Offensive...should be unambiguously stated [as] the destruction of German cities, the killing of German workers, and the disruption of civilized life throughout Germany.

He further said,

the destruction of houses, public utilities, transport and lives, the creation of a refugee problem on an unprecedented scale, and the breakdown of morale both at home and at the battle fronts by fear of extended and intensified bombing, are accepted and intended aims of our bombing policy. They are not by-products of attempts to hit factories.

Colorized footage of British bombing over Germany

By contrast, the United States Strategic Bombing Survey found attacks on waterways, beginning 23 September with strikes against the Dortmund-Ems Canal and Mittelland Canal, produced tremendous traffic problems on the Rhine River. It had immediate effects on shipments of goods, and especially coal deliveries, upon which Germany's economy depended. With no more additional effort, by February 1945, rail transport (which competed for coal) had seen its shipments cut by more than half, and by March, "except in limited areas, the coal supply had been eliminated".

The devastating bombing raids of Dortmund on 12 March 1945 with 1,108 aircraft – 748 Lancasters, 292 Halifaxes, 68 de Havilland Mosquitos – was a record attack on a single target in the whole of World War II. More than 4,800 tons of bombs were dropped through the city centre and the south of the city and destroyed 98% of buildings.

==== Other British efforts ====
Operation Chastise, better known as the Dambusters raid, was an attempt to damage German industrial production by crippling its hydro-electric power and transport in the Ruhr area. The Germans also built large-scale night-time decoys like the Krupp decoy site (Kruppsche Nachtscheinanlage) which was a German decoy-site of the Krupp steel works in Essen. During World War II, it was designed to divert Allied airstrikes from the actual production site of the arms factory.

Operation Hydra of August 1943 sought to destroy German work on long-range rockets but only delayed it by a few months. Subsequent efforts were directed against V-weapons launch sites in France.

=== US bombing in Europe ===
Summary of AAF and RAF bombing

In mid-1942, the United States Army Air Forces (USAAF) arrived in the UK and carried out a few raids across the English Channel. The USAAF Eighth Air Force's B-17 bombers were called the "Flying Fortresses" because of their heavy defensive armament of ten to twelve machine guns — eventually comprising up to thirteen heavy 12.7 mm calibre, "light barrel" Browning M2 guns per bomber — and armor plating in vital locations. In part because of their heavier armament and armor, they carried smaller bomb loads than British bombers. With all of this, the USAAF's commanders in Washington, D.C., and in UK adopted the strategy of taking on the Luftwaffe head on, in larger and larger air raids by mutually defending bombers, flying over Germany, Austria, and France at high altitudes during the daytime. Also, both the US Government and its Army Air Forces commanders were reluctant to bomb enemy cities and towns indiscriminately. They claimed that by using the B-17 and the Norden bombsight, the USAAF should be able to carry out "precision bombing" on locations vital to the German war machine: factories, naval bases, shipyards, railroad yards, railroad junctions, power plants, steel mills, airfields, etc.

In January 1943, at the Casablanca Conference, it was agreed RAF Bomber Command operations against Germany would be reinforced by the USAAF in a Combined Operations Offensive plan called Operation Pointblank. Chief of the British Air Staff Marshal of the Royal Air Force Sir Charles Portal was put in charge of the "strategic direction" of both British and American bomber operations. The text of the Casablanca directive read: "Your primary object will be the progressive destruction and dislocation of the German military, industrial, and economic system and the undermining of the morale of the German people to a point where their capacity for armed resistance is fatally weakened." At the beginning of the combined strategic bombing offensive on 4 March 1943, 669 RAF and 303 USAAF heavy bombers were available.

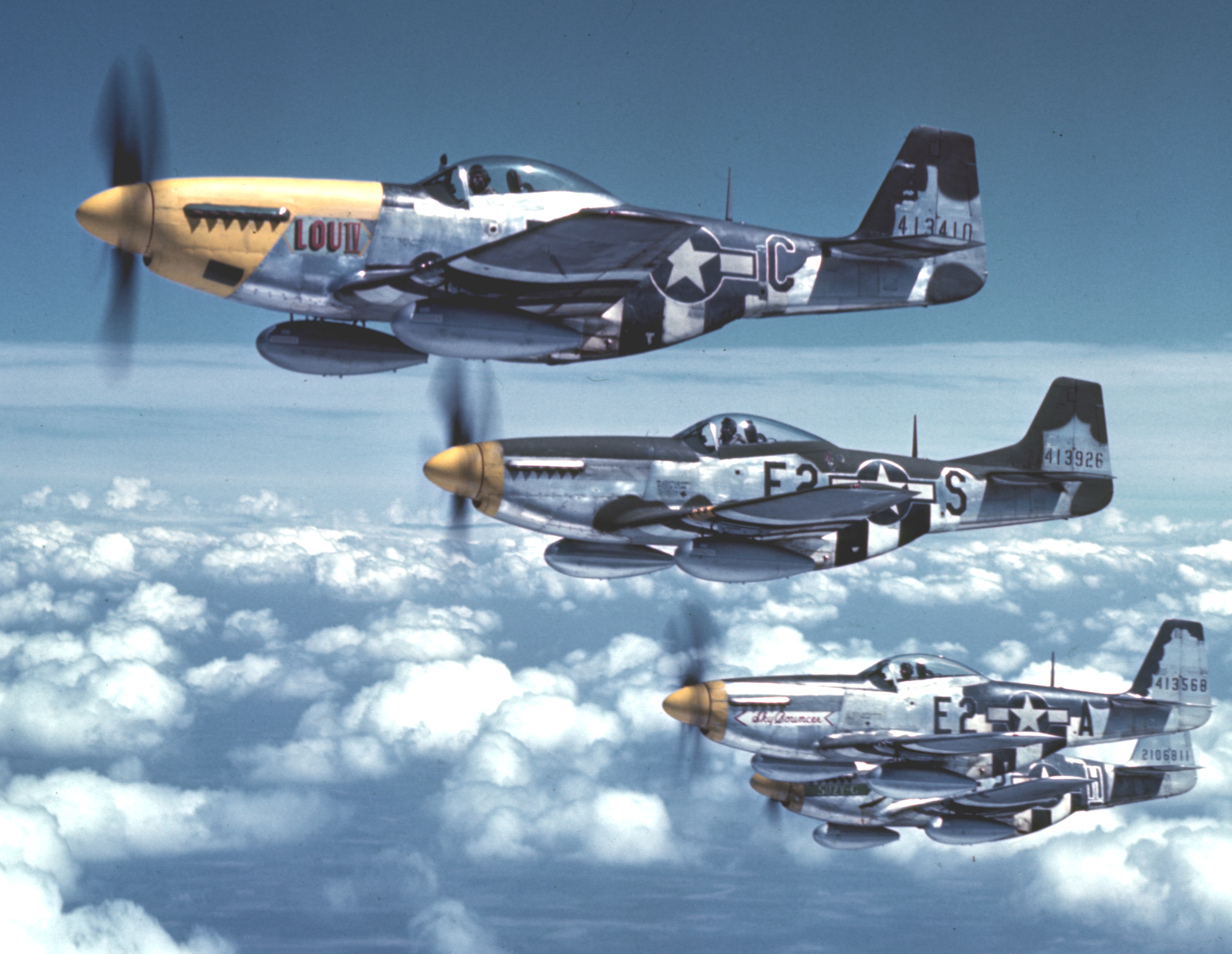
P-51 Mustangs of the 375th Fighter Squadron, Eighth Air Force mid-1944

In late 1943, the Pointblank attacks manifested themselves in the Schweinfurt raids (first and second). Despite the use of combat boxes and the assembly ships to form them, formations of unescorted bombers were no match for German fighters, which inflicted a deadly toll. In despair, the Eighth halted air operations over Germany until a long-range fighter could be found in 1944; it proved to be the North American P-51 Mustang, which had the range to fly to Berlin and back.

USAAF leaders firmly held to the claim of "precision bombing" of military targets for much of the war, and dismissed claims they were simply bombing cities. However, the weather over Europe seldom left the target visible. The American Eighth Air Force received the first H2X radar sets (a derivative of the British H2S navigational radar) in December 1943. Within two weeks of the arrival of these first six sets, the Eighth command gave permission for them to area bomb a city using H2X and would continue to authorize, on average, about one such attack a week until the end of the war in Europe.

In reality, the day bombing of WWII was "precision bombing" only in the sense that most bombs fell somewhere near a specific designated target such as a railway yard. Conventionally, the air forces designated as "the target area" a circle having a radius of 300 metres (1,000 ft) around the aiming point of attack. While accuracy improved during the war, Survey studies show that, overall, only about 20% of the bombs aimed at precision targets fell within this target area. In the fall of 1944, only 7% of all bombs dropped by the Eighth Air Force hit within 300 metres of their aim point.

Nevertheless, the sheer tonnage of explosive delivered by day and by night was eventually sufficient to cause widespread damage, and forced Germany to divert military resources to counter it. The diversion of German fighter planes and anti-aircraft 88 mm artillery from the eastern and western fronts was a significant result of the Allied strategic bombing campaign.

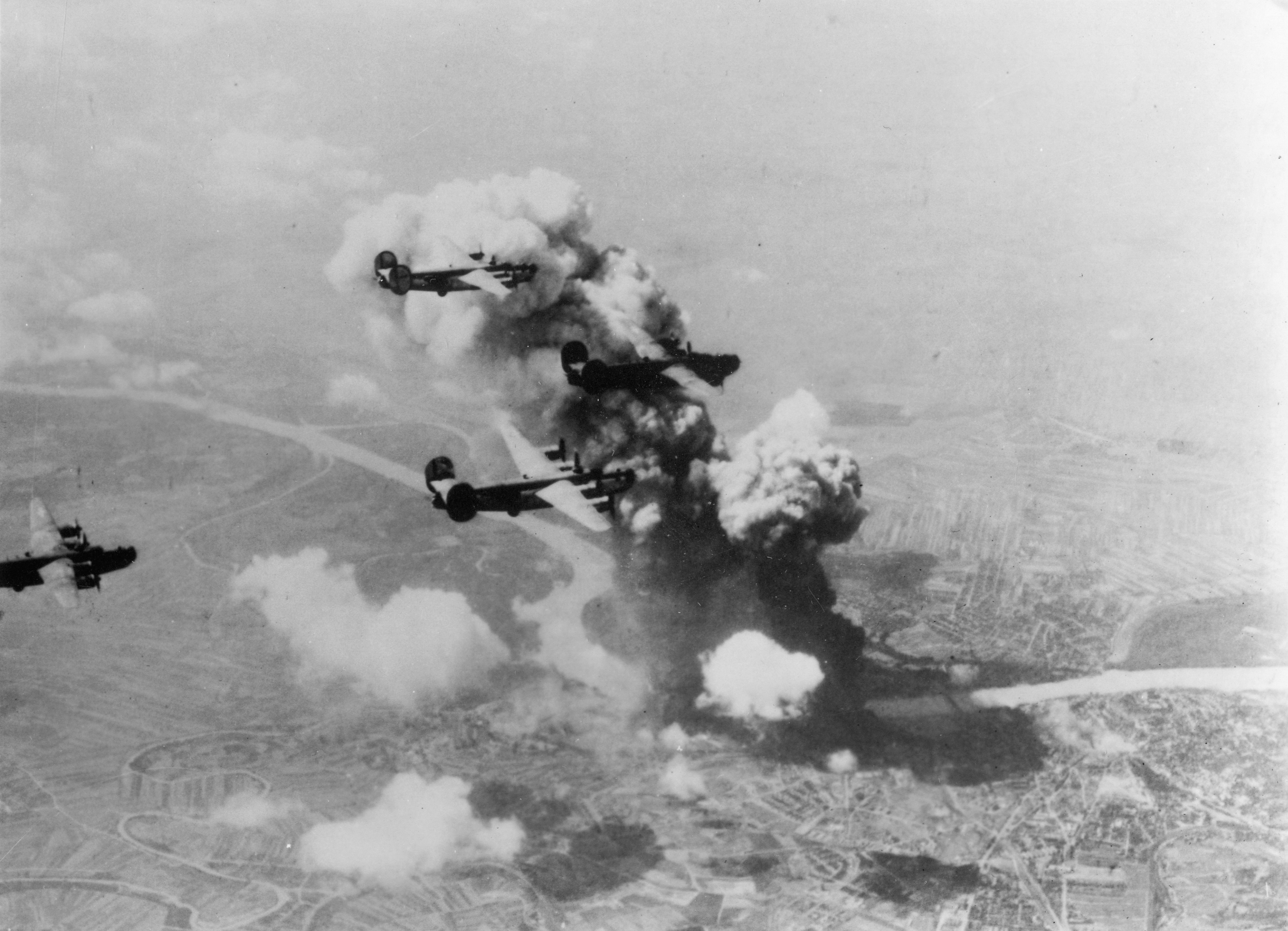
15th Air Force B-24s attacking the Apollo oil refinery in Bratislava, Slovakia, June 16, 1944.

For the sake of improving USAAF firebombing capabilities, a mock-up German Village was built up and repeatedly burned down. It contained full-scale replicas of German residential homes. Firebombing attacks proved quite powerful; in a series of attacks launched by the RAF and US forces in July 1943 on Hamburg, roughly 50,000 civilians were killed and large areas of the city destroyed.

With the arrival of the brand-new Fifteenth Air Force based in Italy, command of the US Air Forces in Europe was consolidated into the United States Strategic Air Forces (USSTAF). With the addition of the Mustang to its strength — and a major change in fighter tactics by the Eighth Air Force, meant to secure daylight air supremacy for the Americans over Germany from the start of 1944 onwards — the Combined Bomber Offensive was resumed. Planners targeted the Luftwaffe in an operation known as "Big Week" (20–25 February 1944) and succeeded brilliantly – its major attacks came during Operation Steinbock (the so-called "Baby Blitz") period for the Luftwaffe over England, while losses for the Luftwaffe's day fighter forces were so heavy that both the twin-engined Zerstörergeschwader heavy fighter wings (the intended main anti-bomber force) and their replacement, single-engined Sturmgruppen of heavily armed Fw 190As became largely ineffective, clearing each force of bomber destroyers in their turn from Germany's skies throughout most of 1944. With such heavy losses of their primary means of defense against the USAAF's tactics, German planners were forced into a hasty dispersal of industry, with the day fighter arm never being able to fully recover in time.

1944 USAAF combined air-arms strategic bombing training film.

On 27 March 1944, the Combined Chiefs of Staff issued orders granting control of all the Allied air forces in Europe, including strategic bombers, to General Dwight D. Eisenhower, the Supreme Allied Commander, who delegated command to his deputy in SHAEF Air Chief Marshal Arthur Tedder. There was resistance to this order from some senior figures, including Churchill, Harris, and Carl Spaatz, but after some debate, control passed to SHAEF on 1 April 1944. When the Combined Bomber Offensive officially ended on 1 April, Allied airmen were well on the way to achieving air superiority over all of Europe. While they continued some strategic bombing, the USAAF along with the RAF turned their attention to the tactical air battle in support of the Normandy Invasion. It was not until the middle of September that the strategic bombing campaign of Germany again became the priority for the USSTAF.

The twin campaigns—the USAAF by day, the RAF by night—built up into massive bombing of German industrial areas, notably the Ruhr, followed by attacks directly on cities such as Hamburg, Kassel, Pforzheim, Mainz and the often-criticized bombing of Dresden.

Approximately 10% of the bombs dropped on Germany are thought to have failed to explode.

=== Bombing in the Netherlands later in the war ===
Eventually, the Netherlands surrendered on the 15th of May 1940, after the bombings of multiple Dutch cities by the Luftwaffe from 10 to 14 May, which had killed 1250-1350 citizens. However, Zeeland continue to resist the German occupation with assistance from Belgian and French forces till the 27th of May, resulting in another bombing by the Luftwaffe in Middelburg on the 17th of May.

During the German occupation of the Netherlands from May 1940, the Allied Forces would perform approximately 600 strategic air bombings on Dutch soil. In most cases, there were no civilians killed, but in total around 10,000 Dutch civilians were killed by airstrikes from the Allied Forces between May 1940 and May 1945. Many survivors were left homeless and wounded.

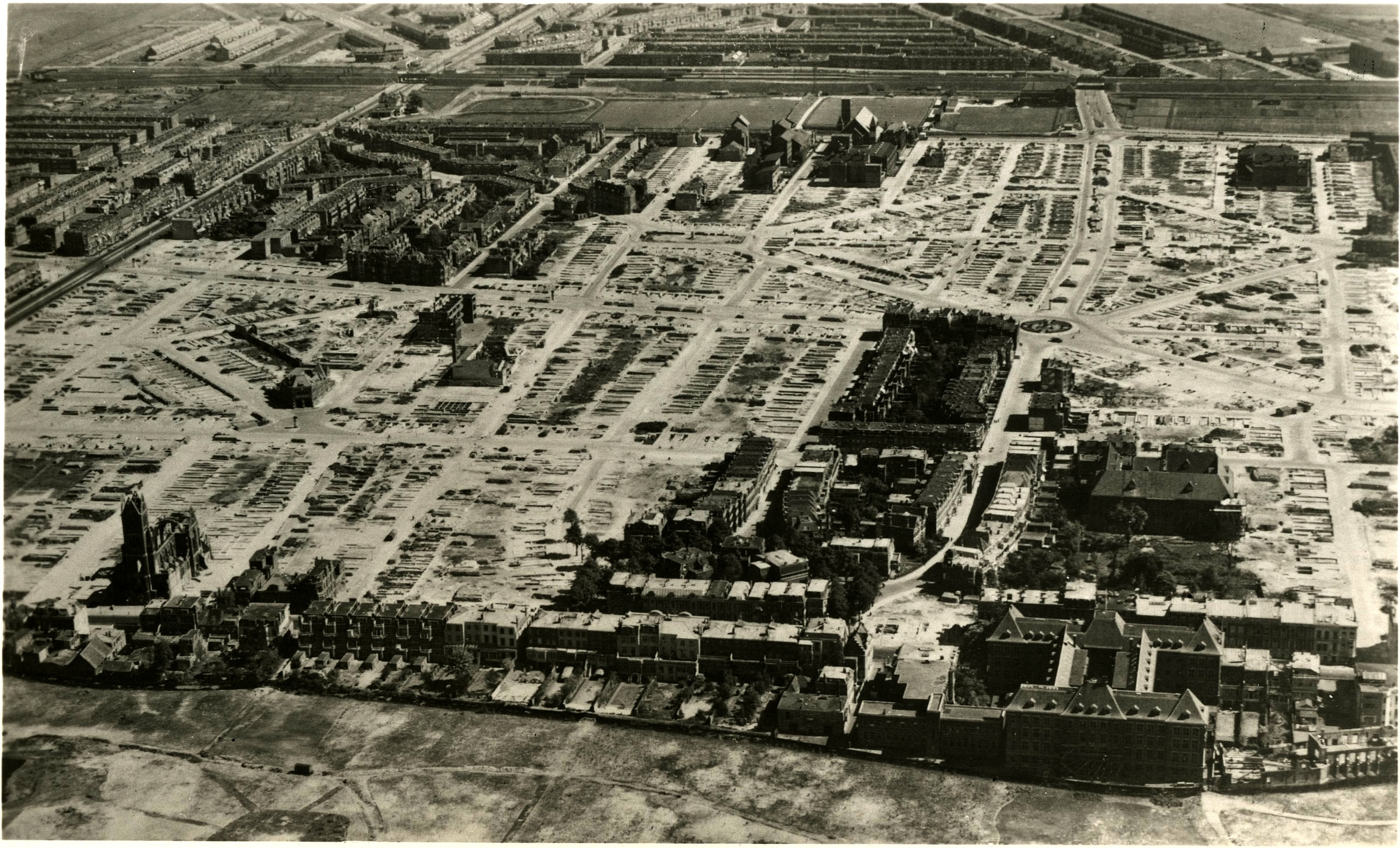
The desolate landscape of the Hague neighbourhood of Bezuidenhout in 1946, after the RAF mistakenly bombed the area on 3 March 1945.

Most of the losses by Allied airstrikes in the Netherlands were caused by mistakenly bombing the wrong target, initially aiming at German-occupied factories, transportation facilities, population registries, Sicherheitsdienst headquarters, or even German cities at the border. The Allies generally exercised restraint when planning bombing raids. It is mainly mistakes in implementation that have often caused the greatest damage. The cities of Amsterdam, Breskens, Den Helder, Rotterdam, and The Hague suffered immense losses in civilians and bombing damage by insufficiently accurate aiming. Sometimes the targets were too small, so the risks of 'collateral damage' were very high, as was shown by the bombing of the Sicherheitsdienst headquarters in Amsterdam and Rotterdam, the station yards of Haarlem, Utrecht, Roosendaal and Leiden, and the bridges in Zutphen and Venlo. However, the attacks on such small targets remained relatively limited. Less restraint was exercised by the Allies during the 1944–1945 bombings on the residential areas at the front line, such as Huissen, Venray, Montfort, Nijverdal, Goor and Haaksbergen, resulting in preventable civilian losses.

The occupying German forces had used the coast of the Netherlands to launch rocket attacks targeting British cities. This was another reasons for the Allies to perform airstrikes on Dutch soil, leading to one of the deadliest civilian airstrikes in the Netherlands. On 3 March 1945, the RAF mistakenly bombed the densely populated Bezuidenhout neighbourhood in the city of The Hague. The British bomber crews had intended to bomb the Haagse Bos ("Forest of the Hague") district where the Germans had installed V-2 launching facilities that had been used to attack British cities. However, the pilots were issued with the wrong coordinates, so the navigational instruments of the bombers had been set incorrectly. Combined with fog and clouds which obscured their vision, the bombs were instead dropped on the Bezuidenhout residential neighbourhood. At the time, the neighbourhood was more densely populated than usual with evacuees from The Hague and Wassenaar; 532 residents were killed and approximately 30,000 were left homeless.

During the end of the war in 1944–1945, the Luftwaffe would again drop bombs on multiple Dutch cities, which were already liberated by the Allies in Operation Market Garden while the rest of the country was still under German occupation. The Netherlands was one of the last European countries to eventually be liberated by the Allies on 5 May 1945.

=== Bombing in Romania ===
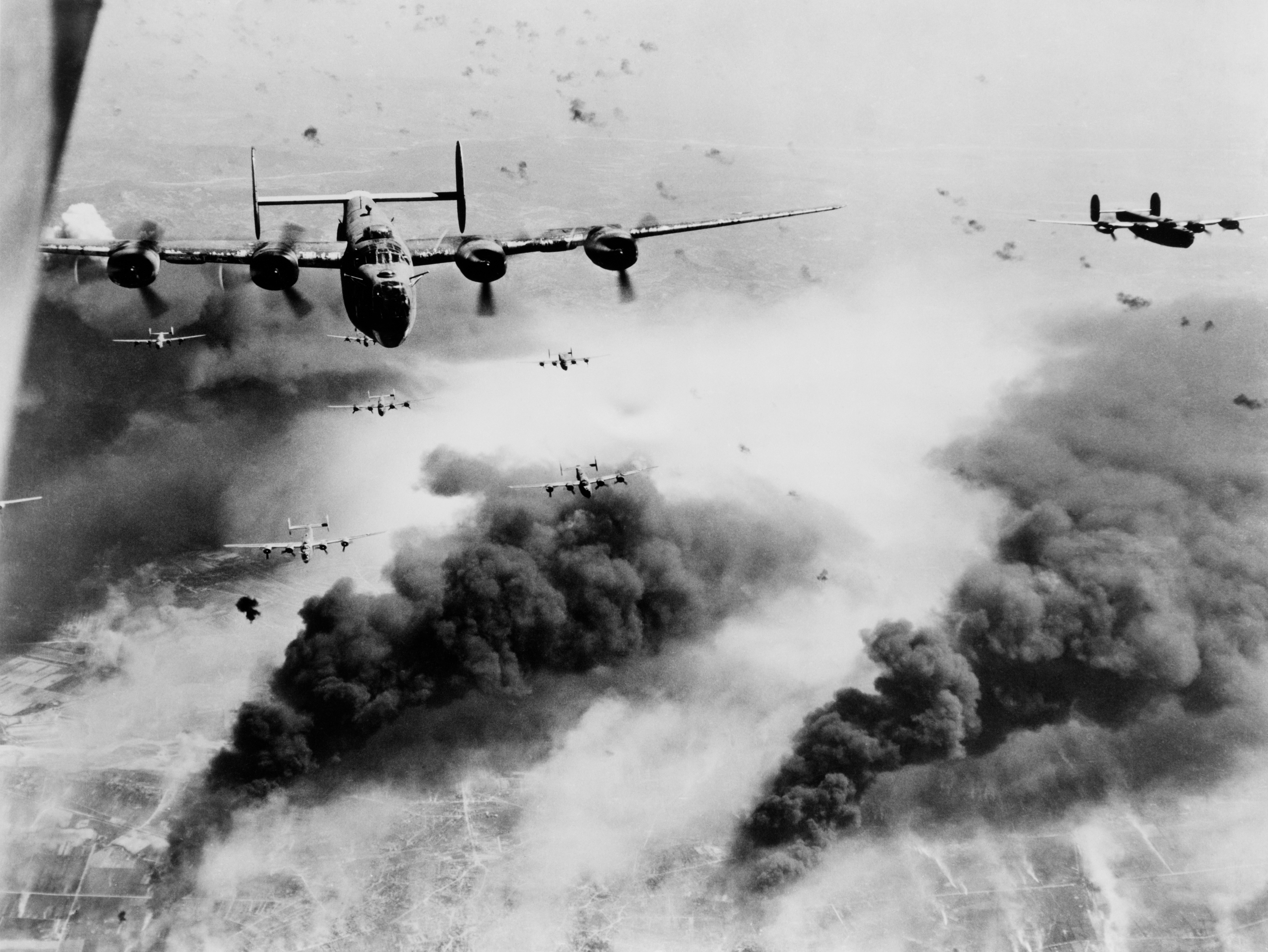
15th Air Force B-24s flying through flak and over the destruction created by preceding waves of bombers (Ploiești, Romania, 1944)

The first airstrikes against Romania occurred after Romania joined the Third Reich in June 1941 during their invasion of the Soviet Union. In the following two months, Soviet Air Forces conducted several attacks against the King Carol I Bridge, destroying one of its spans and damaging an oil pipeline. However, after the successful Axis powers Crimean Campaign and overall deterioration of the Soviet position, Soviet attacks against Romania ceased.

The USAAF first dropped bombs on Romania on 12 June 1942 during the HALPRO (Halverson project) raid against Ploiești (the first US mission against a European target). Thirteen B-24 Liberator heavy bombers under the command of Col. Harry A. Halverson from Fayid, Egypt dropped eight bombs into the Black Sea, two onto Constanța, six onto Ploiești, six onto Teișani, and several onto Ciofliceni. In all, three people were killed and damage was minor. The bombing of Ploiești on 1 August 1943 (Operation Tidal Wave) was a far more serious affair. Tidal Wave heavily damaged four refineries and more lightly affected three; it damaged the Ploiești rail station but did not have much impact on the city itself. Câmpina was more severely damaged. 660 American aircrew were killed or captured, while petroleum exports exceeded pre-Tidal Wave levels by October. Around 100 civilians were killed and 200 wounded as a result of Operation Tidal Wave.

Anglo-American bombers first attacked Bucharest on 4 April 1944, aiming mainly to interrupt military transports from Romania to the Eastern Front and oil transports to Germany. Bucharest stored and distributed much of Ploiești's refined oil products. The bombing campaign of Bucharest continued until August 1944, after which Romania joined the Allies following a coup by King Michael I against Ion Antonescu. The operations against Bucharest resulted in destroying thousands of buildings and killing or injuring over 9,000 people. In all, the bombardments killed some 7,693 civilians and wounded another 7,809.

After the 23 August 1944 coup, the Luftwaffe began bombing Bucharest in the attempt to remove the King and Government from power. The raids lasted from 24 to 26 August and killed or wounded over 300 civilians and damaged many buildings.

=== Bombing in Italy ===
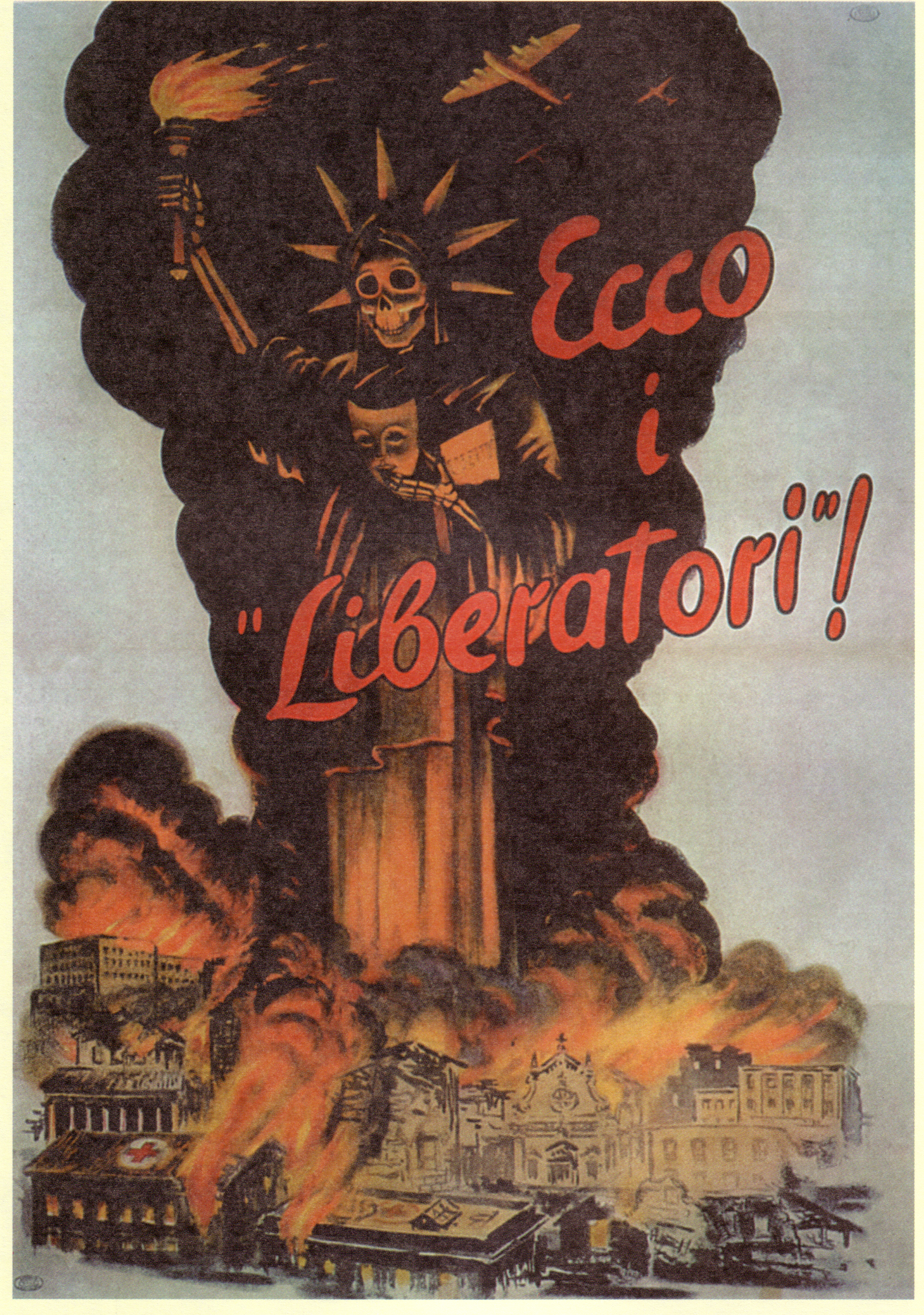
"Behold the Liberators!", propaganda poster issued by the Italian Social Republic, with the Statue of Liberty having a skull.

Italy, first as an Axis member and later as a German-occupied country, was heavily bombed by Allied forces for all the duration of the war. In Northern Italy, after small-scale bombings which mainly targeted factories, only causing little damage and casualties, RAF Bomber Command launched a first large-scale area bombing campaign on Milan, Turin and Genoa (the so-called 'industrial triangle') during the autumn of 1942. All three cities suffered heavy damage and hundreds of civilian casualties, although the effects were less disastrous than those suffered by German cities, mainly because Italian cities had centres made of brick and stone buildings, while German cities had centers made of wooden buildings. Milan and Turin were bombed again in February 1943; the heaviest raids were carried out in July (295 bombers dropped 763 tons of bombs on Turin, killing 792 people) and August (all three cities were bombed and a total of 843 bombers dropped 2,268 tons of bombs over Milan, causing about 900 casualties). These attacks caused widespread damage and prompted most of the cities' inhabitants to flee. The only other city in Italy to be subjected to area bombing was La Spezia, heavily bombed by the Bomber Command during April 1943, with slight casualties but massive damage (45% of the buildings were destroyed or heavily damaged, and just 25–30% remained undamaged). The effect of this on Italian war production was substantial, with a 60% reduction of capacity caused, not so much by the physical destruction of factories, but by the workforce leaving the bombed areas for the safety of less industrialised areas. This is the morale effect looked for in much of the bombing of Europe, based on the observed effects of the Blitz on industrial production in Britain.

During 1944 and 1945 Milan, Turin and Genoa were instead bombed by USAAF bombers, which mainly targeted factories and marshalling yards; nonetheless, imprecision in bombings caused further destruction of vast areas. By the end of the war, about 30–40% of the buildings in each of the three cities were destroyed, and both in Milan and Turin less than half of the city remained undamaged. 2,199 people were killed in Turin and over 2,200 in Milan. Several other cities in northern Italy suffered heavy damage and casualties due to USAAF bombings, usually aimed at factories and marshalling yards but often inaccurate; among them Bologna (2,481 casualties), Padua (about 2,000 casualties), Rimini (98% of the city was destroyed or damaged), Treviso (1,600 killed in the bombing of 7 April 1944, 80% of the city destroyed or damaged), Trieste (463 casualties on 10 June 1944), Vicenza (317 casualties on 18 November 1944).

In Southern Italy, after small-scale bombings by the RAF (more frequent than in the north), USAAF started its bombing campaign in December 1942. The bombings mostly targeted harbour facilities, marshalling yards, factories and airports, but the inaccuracy of the attacks caused extensive destruction and civilian casualties; among the cities hit the hardest were Naples (6,000 casualties), Messina (more than one third of the city was destroyed, and only 30% remained untouched), Reggio Calabria, Foggia (thousands of casualties), Cagliari (416 inhabitants were killed in the bombings of February 1943, 80% of the city was damaged or destroyed), Palermo, Catania and Trapani (70% of the buildings were damaged or destroyed).

Central Italy was left untouched for the first three years of war, but from 1943 onwards it was heavily bombed by USAAF, with heavy damage (usually due to inaccuracy in bombing) to a number of cities, including Livorno (57% of the city was destroyed or damaged, over 500 people were killed in June 1943), Civitavecchia, Grosseto, Terni (1,077 casualties), Pisa (1,738 casualties), Pescara (between 2,200 and 3,900 casualties), Ancona (1,182 casualties), Viterbo (1,017 casualties) and Isernia (about 500 casualties on 11 September 1943). Rome was bombed on several occasions; the historic centre and the Vatican were spared, but the suburbs suffered heavy damage and between 3,000 and 5,000 casualties. Florence also suffered some bombings in the outskirts (215 people were killed on 25 September 1943), while the historical centre was not bombed. Venice proper was never bombed.

In Dalmatia, the Italian enclave of Zara suffered extensive bombing, which destroyed 60% of the city and killed about 1,000 of its 20,000 inhabitants, prompting most of the population to flee to mainland Italy (the town was later annexed to Yugoslavia).

Except for Rome, Venice, Florence, Urbino and Siena, damage to cultural heritage in Italy was widespread.

=== Bombing in France ===
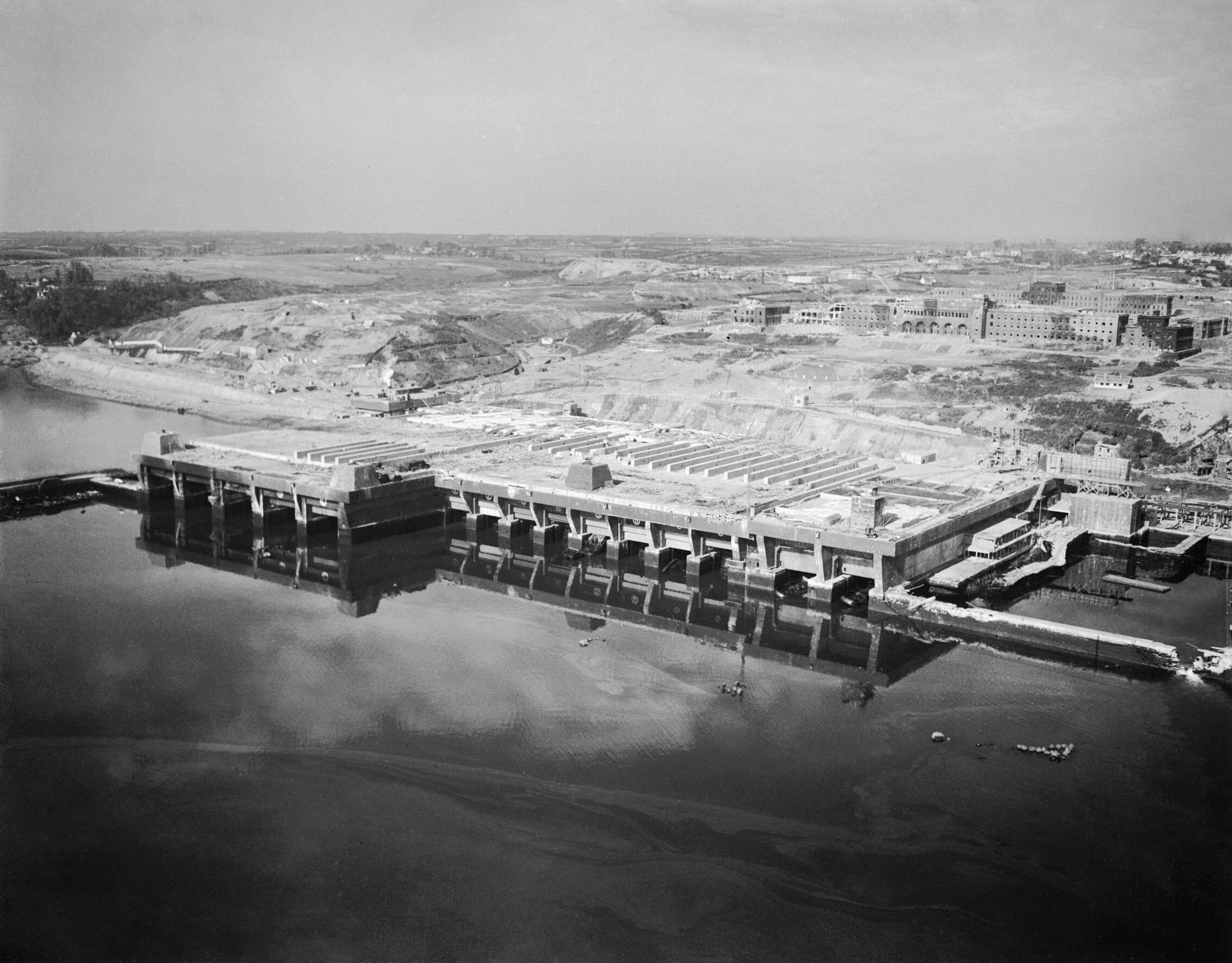
German-occupied submarine pens in Brest, France after an allied bombing raid

German-occupied France contained a number of important targets that attracted the attention of the British, and later American bombing. In 1940, RAF Bomber Command launched attacks against German preparations for Operation Sealion, the proposed invasion of England, attacking Channel Ports in France and Belgium and sinking large numbers of barges that had been collected by the Germans for use in the invasion. France's Atlantic ports were important bases for both German surface ships and submarines, while French industry was an important contributor to the German war effort.

Before 1944, the Allies bombed targets in France that were part of the German war industry. This included raids such as those on the Renault factory in Boulogne-Billancourt in March 1942 or the port facilities of Nantes in September 1943 (which killed 1,500 civilians). In preparation of Allied landings in Normandy and those in the south of France, French infrastructure (mainly rail transport) was intensively targeted by RAF and USAAF in May and June 1944. Despite intelligence provided by the French Resistance, many residential areas were hit in error or lack of accuracy. This included cities like Marseille (2,000 dead), Lyon (1,000 dead), Saint-Étienne, Rouen, Orléans, Grenoble, Nice, Paris and surrounds (1000+ dead), and so on. The Free French Air Force, operational since 1941, used to opt for the more risky skimming tactic when operating in national territory, to avoid civilian casualties. On 5 January 1945, British bombers struck the "Atlantic pocket" of Royan and destroyed 85% of this city. A later raid, using napalm was carried out before it was freed from Nazi occupation in April. Of the 3,000 civilians left in the city, 442 died.

French civilian casualties due to Allied strategic bombing are estimated at half of the 67,000 French civilian dead during Allied operations in 1942–1945; the other part being mostly killed during tactical bombing in the Normandy campaign. 22% of the bombs dropped in Europe by British and American air forces between 1940 and 1945 were in France. The port city of Le Havre had been destroyed by 132 bombings during the war (5,000 dead) until September 1944. It has been rebuilt by architect Auguste Perret and is now a World Heritage Site.

=== Soviet strategic bombing ===
The first Soviet offensive bomber campaign was directed against the Romanian oilfields in the summer of 1941. In response to a German raid on Moscow on the night of 21–22 July 1941, Soviet Naval Aviation launched a series of seven raids against Germany, primarily Berlin, between the night of 7–8 August and 3–4 September. These attacks were undertaken by between four and fifteen aircraft—beginning on 11 August the new Tupolev TB-7—from the island of Saaremaa, base of the 1st Torpedo Air Regiment. (At least one raid of the 81st Air Division took off from Pushkin Airport.) Besides thirty tonnes of bombs, they also dropped leaflets with Joseph Stalin's defiant speech of 3 July. The Soviets sent a total of 549 long-range bombers over German territory in all of 1941.

In March 1942 the strategic bombing arm of the Soviet Union was reorganized as the Long Range Air Force (ADD). It raided Berlin from 26 to 29 August and again on the night of 9–10 September with 212 planes. It raided Helsinki for the first time on 24 August, Budapest on 4–5 and 9–10 September and Bucharest on 13–14 September. The German-occupied Polish cities of Kraków and Warsaw were not exempt, but the bombers concentrated primarily on military targets. There were 1,114 sorties over Germany in 1942. In March 1943 there was a strategic shift: in preparation for the Kursk Offensive, the bombers were directed against the German railroads behind the front. In April the Long Range Air Force expanded to eight air corps and eleven independent divisions containing 700 planes. After the Kursk preparations, the Soviets turned their attention to administrative and industrial targets in East Prussia in April. With 920 aircraft taking part, they dropped 700 tonnes of bombs there. The largest Soviet bomb of the war, an 5,000-kilogram (11,000 lb) weapon, was dropped on Königsberg during one of these raids.

Throughout 1943, the Soviets attempted to give the impression of cooperation between their bombers and those of the West. In February 1944, they again shifted priority with the goal of knocking Finland and Hungary out of the war. Helsinki was struck by 733 bombers on the night of 6–7 February, by 367 on the 15–16th and 850 on the 25–26th. A total of 2,386 tonnes of bombs were dropped. Budapest was hit four straight nights from 13 to 20 September with a total of 8,000 tonnes by 1,129 bombers. The Soviets flew 4,466 sorties into enemy territory in the year 1944. In December the Long Range Air Force was reorganized as the 18th Air Army.

The main task of the 18th Air Army was to support the final offensive against Germany, but it also undertook raids against Berlin, Breslau, Danzig and Königsberg. In total, 7,158 Soviet aircraft dropped 6,700 tonnes of bombs on Germany during the war, 3.1% of Soviet bomber sorties, 0.5% of all Allied "strategic" sorties against German-occupied territory and 0.2% of all bombs dropped on it.

After the war, Marxist historians in the Soviet Union and East Germany claimed that the Soviet strategic bombing campaign was limited by moral qualms over bombing civilian centres. One early bombing theorist, Vasili Chripin, whose theories influenced the Soviet Union's first strategic bombing guidelines (1936) and the service regulations of 26 January 1940, drew back from terror bombing as advocated by Western theorists. The Spanish Civil War also convinced Soviet war planners that the air force was most effective when used in close cooperation with ground forces. Nonetheless, after the war, Marshal Vasili Sokolovsky admitted that the Soviets would have gladly launched a strategic bombing offensive had they the capability. In reality, the Soviets never geared aircraft production towards long-range bombers, beyond the small force of indigenously designed and produced Petlyakov Pe-8 four-engined "heavies", and so never had enough to mount an effective campaign. The land-based nature of warfare on the Eastern Front also required closer cooperation between the air forces and ground troops than did, for example, the defence of Great Britain.

=== Effectiveness of Allied strategic bombing ===
Strategic bombing has been criticized on practical grounds because it does not work predictably. The radical changes it forces on a targeted population can backfire, including the counterproductive result of freeing non-essential labourers to fill worker shortages in war industries.

Much of the doubt about the effectiveness of the bomber war comes from the fact that German industrial production increased throughout the war. A combination of factors helped increase German war material output, these included; continuing development from production lines started before the war, limiting competing models of equipment, government enforced sharing of production techniques, a change in how contracts were priced and an aggressive worker suggestion program. At the same time production plants had to deal with a loss of experienced workers to the military, assimilating untrained workers, culling workers incapable of being trained, and using unwilling forced labor. Strategic bombing failed to reduce German war production. There is insufficient information to ascertain how much additional potential industrial growth the bombing campaign may have curtailed. However, attacks on the infrastructure were taking place. The attacks on Germany's canals and railroads made transportation of materiel difficult.

The Oil Campaign of World War II was, however, extremely successful and made a very large contribution to the general collapse of Germany in 1945. In the event, the bombing of oil facilities became Albert Speer's main concern.

German insiders credit the Allied bombing offensive with crippling the German war industry. Speer repeatedly said both during and after the war that it caused crucial production problems. Admiral Karl Dönitz, head of the U-boat fleet (U-waffe), noted in his memoirs the failure to get the Type XXI U-boats into service was entirely the result of the air campaign. According to the United States Strategic Bombing Survey (Europe), despite bombing becoming a major effort, between December 1942 and June 1943, "The attack on the construction yards and slipways was not heavy enough to be more than troublesome" and the delays in delivery of Type XXIs and XXIIIs up until November 1944 "cannot be attributed to the air attack", however, "The attacks during the late winter and early spring of 1945 did close, or all but close, five of the major yards, including the great Blohm and Voss plant at Hamburg".

Adam Tooze contends that many of the sources on bombing effectiveness are "highly self-critical after-the-battle analyses" by the former Western Allies. In his book The Wages of Destruction, he makes the case that the bombing was effective. Richard Overy argues that the bombing campaign absorbed a significant proportion of German resources that could have been used on the Eastern Front; according to Overy, in 1943 and 1944, two-thirds of German fighters were being used to fend off bomber attacks, which Overy argues was a significant hindrance for the Luftwaffe as it prevented them from conducting bombing operations against the Soviets even though such an air campaign had caused considerable damage to the Soviets early in the war. Overy also reports that by the end of 1943, 75% of Flak 88 mm guns were being used in air defence, preventing them from being used for anti-tank work on the Eastern Front despite their effectiveness in such a role. Overy also estimates that Britain spent about 7% of her war effort on bombing, which he concludes was not a waste of resources.

Buckley argues the German war economy did indeed expand significantly following Albert Speer's appointment as Reichsminister of Armaments, "but it is spurious to argue that because production increased then bombing had no real impact". The bombing offensive did do serious damage to German production levels. German tank and aircraft production, though reached new records in production levels in 1944, was in particular one-third lower than planned. In fact, German aircraft production for 1945 was planned at 80,000, showing Erhard Milch and other leading German planners were pushing for even higher outputs; "unhindered by Allied bombing German production would have risen far higher".

=== Effect on morale ===
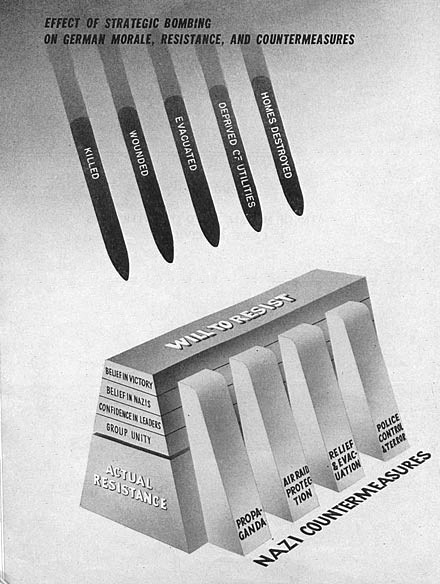
Diagram showing the effects of strategic bombing on German morale in 1945. From the United States Strategic Bombing Survey, Morale Division.

According to Professor John Buckley, the impact of bombing on German morale was significant. Around a third of the urban population under threat of bombing had no protection at all. Some of the major cities saw 55–60% of dwellings destroyed. Mass evacuations were a partial answer for six million civilians, but this had a severe effect on morale as German families were split up to live in difficult conditions. By 1944, absenteeism rates of 20–25% were not unusual and in post-war analysis 91% of civilians stated bombing was the most difficult hardship to endure and was the key factor in the collapse of their own morale. The United States Strategic Bombing Survey concluded that the bombing was not stiffening morale but seriously depressing it; fatalism, apathy, defeatism were apparent in bombed areas. The Luftwaffe was blamed for not warding off the attacks and confidence in the Nazi regime fell by 14%. By the spring of 1944, some 75% of Germans believed the war was lost, owing to the intensity of the bombing.

Historian Max Hastings and the authors of the official history of the bomber offensive, Noble Frankland among them, has argued bombing had a limited effect on morale. In the words of the British Bombing Survey Unit (BBSU), "The essential premise behind the policy of treating towns as unit targets for area attack, namely that the German economic system was fully extended, was false." This, the BBSU noted, was because official estimates of German war production were "more than 100 percent in excess of the true figures". The BBSU concluded, "Far from there being any evidence of a cumulative effect on (German) war production, it is evident that, as the (bombing) offensive progressed ... the effect on war production became progressively smaller (and) did not reach significant dimensions."

=== Allied bombing statistics 1939–1945 ===
According to the United States Strategic Bombing Survey, Allied bombers between 1939 and 1945 dropped 1,415,745 tons of bombs over Germany (51.1% of the total bomb tonnage dropped by Allied bombers in the European campaign), 570,730 tons over France (20.6%), 379,565 tons over Italy (13.7%), 185,625 tons over Austria, Hungary and the Balkans (6.7%), and 218,873 tons over other countries (7.9%).

RAF bombing sorties and losses 1939–1945
| | Sorties (Note: A sortie was one aircraft on a single combat operation) | Losses |
|---|---|---|
| Night | 297,663 | 7,449 |
| Day | 66,851 | 876 |
| Total | 364,484 | 8,325 |

RAF and USAAF bomb tonnages on Germany 1939–1945
| Year | RAF Bomber Command (tons) | US 8th Air Force (tons) |
|---|---|---|
| 1939 | 31 | — |
| 1940 | 13,033 | — |
| 1941 | 31,504 | — |
| 1942 | 45,561 | 1,561 |
| 1943 | 157,457 | 44,165 |
| 1944 | 525,518 | 389,119 |
| 1945 | 191,540 | 188,573 |
| Total | 964,644 | 623,418 |

=== Casualties ===
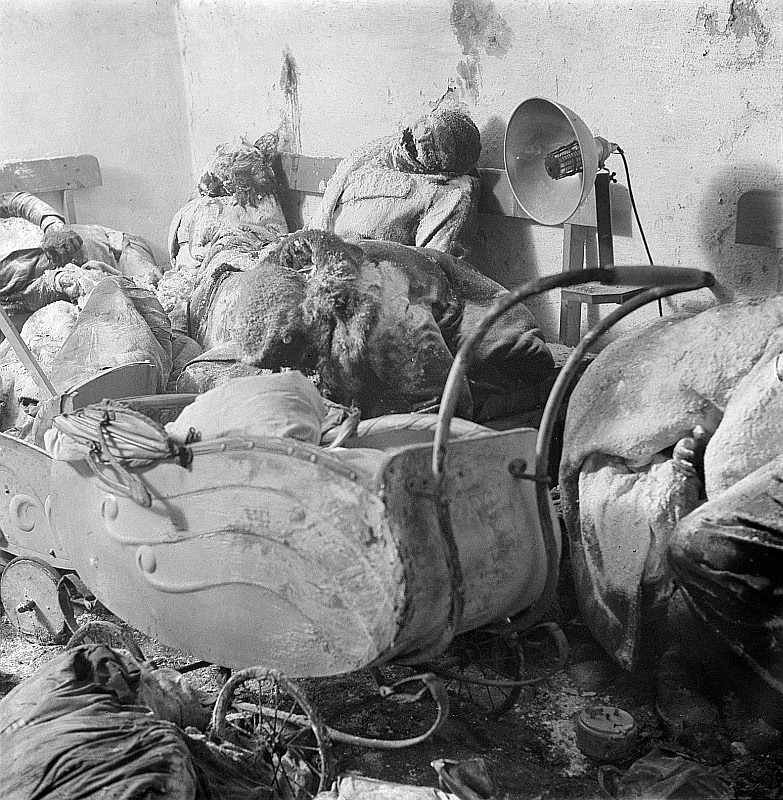
Civilian casualties in Dresden after Allied bombing on the night of 13 February 1945

After the war, the US Strategic Bombing Survey reviewed the available casualty records in Germany and concluded that official German statistics of casualties from air attack had been too low. The survey estimated that at a minimum 305,000 were killed in German cities due to bombing and estimated a minimum of 780,000 wounded. Roughly 7,500,000 German civilians were also rendered homeless. Overy estimated in 2014 that in all about 353,000 civilians were killed by Allies bombing raids against German cities. In addition to the minimum figure given in the Strategic bombing survey, the number of people killed by Allied bombing in Germany has been estimated at between 400,000 and 600,000. In the United Kingdom, 60,595 Britons were killed by German bombing, and in France, 67,078 French people were killed by Allied bombing raids.

Belgrade was heavily bombed by the Luftwaffe on 6 April 1941, when more than 17,000 people were killed. According to The Oxford companion to World War II, "After Italy's surrender the Allies kept up the bombing of the northern part occupied by the Germans and more than 50,000 Italians were killed in these raids." An Istat study of 1957 stated that 64,354 Italians were killed by aerial bombing, 59,796 of whom were civilians. Historians Marco Gioannini and Giulio Massobrio argued in 2007 that this figure is inaccurate due to loss of documents, confusion and gaps, and estimated the total number of civilian casualties in Italy due to aerial bombing as comprised between 80,000 and 100,000. Over 160,000 Allied airmen and 33,700 planes were lost in the European theatre.

== Asia ==
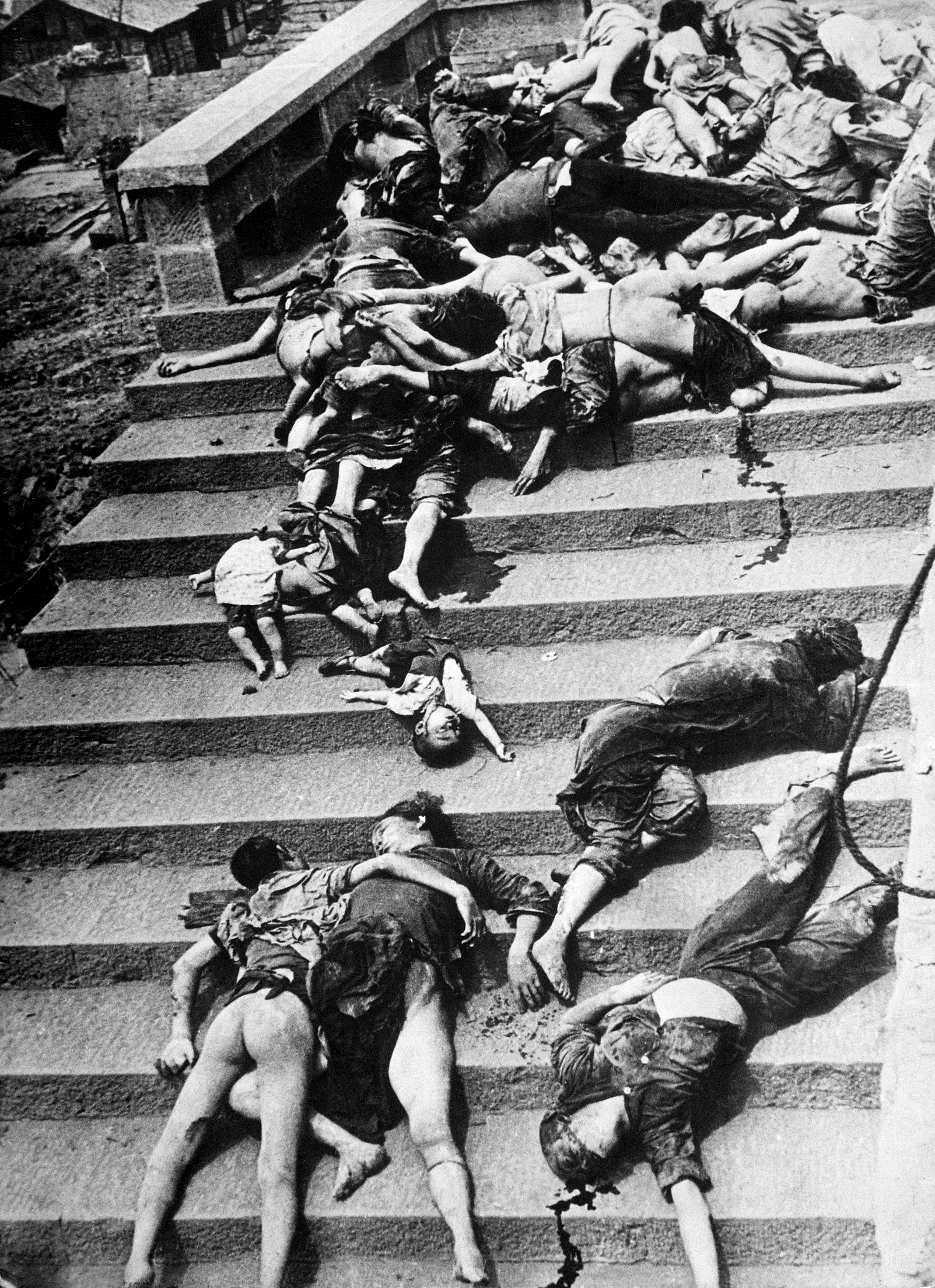
Chinese casualties of a mass panic during a June 1941 Japanese aerial Bombing of Chongqing

Within Asia, the majority of strategic bombing was carried out by the Japanese and the US. The British Commonwealth planned that once the war in Europe was complete, a strategic bombing force of up to 1,000 heavy bombers ("Tiger Force") would be sent to the Far East. This was never realised before the end of the Pacific War.

=== Japanese bombing ===
Japanese strategic bombing was independently conducted by the Imperial Japanese Navy Air Service and the Imperial Japanese Army Air Service. The first large-scale bombing raid, carried out over Shanghai on 28 January 1932, has been called "the first terror bombing of a civilian population of an era that was to become familiar with it". Bombing efforts mostly targeted large Chinese cities such as Shanghai, Wuhan, and Chongqing, with around 5,000 raids from February 1938 to August 1943 in the latter case.

The bombing of Nanjing and Canton, which began on 22 and 23 September 1937, called forth widespread protests culminating in a resolution by the Far Eastern Advisory Committee of the League of Nations. Lord Cranborne, the British Under-Secretary of State For Foreign Affairs, expressed his indignation in his own declaration.

Words cannot express the feelings of profound horror with which the news of these raids had been received by the whole civilized world. They are often directed against places far from the actual area of hostilities. The military objective, where it exists, seems to take a completely second place. The main object seems to be to inspire terror by the indiscriminate slaughter of civilians...

— Lord Cranborne

The Imperial Japanese Navy also carried out a carrier-based airstrike on the armed neutralitarian United States at Pearl Harbor and Oahu on 7 December 1941, resulting in almost 2,500 fatalities and plunging America into World War II the next day. There were also air raids on the Philippines, Burma, Singapore, Ceylon, and northern Australia (Bombing of Darwin, 19 February 1942).

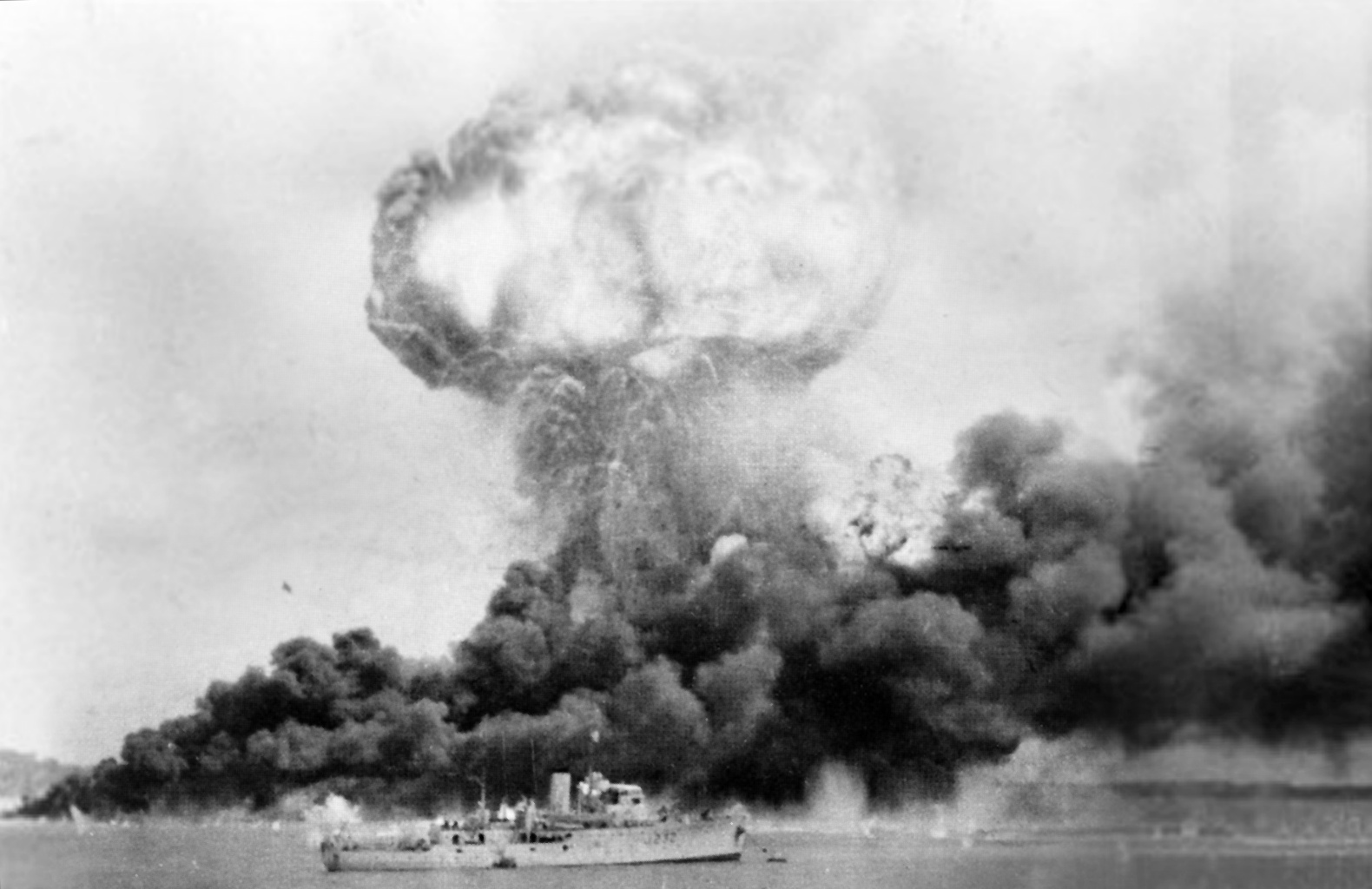
The Bombing of Darwin was the largest single attack ever mounted on Australian soil.

=== Italian bombing ===
In 1940 and 1941, the Regia Aeronautica, seeking to disrupt Allied oil supplies, struck British targets in the Middle East, mainly using the CANT Z.1007 and Savoia-Marchetti SM.82 bombers. For a year starting in June 1940, Italian bombers attacked Mandatory Palestine, mainly targeting Haifa and Tel Aviv for their large refineries and port facilities. The deadliest single attack came on 9 September 1940, when an Italian raid over Tel Aviv killed 137 people. While Italian efforts mainly focused on the Mandate of Palestine, one notable mission on 19 October 1940 struck instead at refinery facilities in Bahrain.

=== Allied bombing of South-East Asia ===
After the Japanese invasion of Thailand (8 December 1941), the southeast Asian kingdom signed a treaty of alliance with Japan and declared war on the United States and the United Kingdom. The Allies dropped 18,583 bombs on Thailand during the war, resulting in the death of 8,711 people and the destruction of 9,616 buildings. The primary target of the campaign was Bangkok, the Thai capital. Rural areas were almost entirely unaffected.

In August 1942, the United States Fourteenth Air Force based in southern China undertook the first air raids in French Indochina. The American bombing campaign gained intensity after the surrender of Germany in May 1945, and by July Japanese defences were incapable of impeding their movement. The Americans had attained complete air supremacy. After the victory over Japan, on 19 August the denizens of Hanoi broke into the streets and removed the black coverings off the street lamps.

In 1944–45, the Eastern Fleet of the Royal Navy undertook several raids on the occupied Netherlands East Indies. They also bombed the Japanese-occupied Indian territory of the Andaman and Nicobar Islands.

=== US bombing of Japan ===
Conventional bombing damage to Japanese cities in World War II
| City | % area destroyed |
|---|---|
| Yokohama | 58% |
| Tokyo | 51% |
| Toyama | 99% |
| Nagoya | 40% |
| Osaka | 35.1% |
| Nishinomiya | 11.9% |
| Shimonoseki | 37.6% |
| Kure | 41.9% |
| Kobe | 55.7% |
| Ōmuta | 35.8% |
| Wakayama | 50% |
| Kawasaki | 36.2% |
| Okayama | 68.9% |
| Yahata | 21.2% |
| Kagoshima | 63.4% |
| Amagasaki | 18.9% |
| Sasebo | 41.4% |
| Moji | 23.3% |
| Miyakonojō | 26.5% |
| Nobeoka | 25.2% |
| Miyazaki | 26.1% |
| Ube | 20.7% |
| Saga | 44.2% |
| Imabari | 63.9% |
| Matsuyama | 64% |
| Fukui | 86% |
| Tokushima | 85.2% |
| Sakai | 48.2% |
| Hachioji | 65% |
| Kumamoto | 31.2% |
| Isesaki | 56.7% |
| Takamatsu | 67.5% |
| Akashi | 50.2% |
| Fukuyama | 80.9% |
| Aomori | 30% |
| Okazaki | 32.2% |
| Ōita | 28.2% |
| Hiratsuka | 48.4% |
| Tokuyama | 48.3% |
| Yokkaichi | 33.6% |
| Ujiyamada | 41.3% |
| Ōgaki | 39.5% |
| Gifu | 63.6% |
| Shizuoka | 66.1% |
| Himeji | 49.4% |
| Fukuoka | 24.1% |
| Kōchi | 55.2% |
| Shimizu | 42% |
| Ōmura | 33.1% |
| Chiba | 41% |
| Ichinomiya | 56.3% |
| Nara | 69.3% |
| Tsu | 69.3% |
| Kuwana | 75% |
| Toyohashi | 61.9% |
| Numazu | 42.3% |
| Choshi | 44.2% |
| Kofu | 78.6% |
| Utsunomiya | 43.7% |
| Mito | 68.9% |
| Sendai | 21.9% |
| Tsuruga | 65.1% |
| Nagaoka | 64.9% |
| Hitachi | 72% |
| Kumagaya | 55.1% |
| Hamamatsu | 60.3% |
| Maebashi | 64.2% |

The United States began effective strategic bombing of Japan in late 1944, when B-29s began operating from Guam and Tinian in the Marianas Islands. Before that, US forces had mounted a single raid from an aircraft carrier in 1942, and ineffective long-range raids from China from June to December 1944. In the last seven months of the campaign, a change to firebombing resulted in great destruction of 67 Japanese cities, as many as 500,000 Japanese deaths and some 5 million more made homeless. Emperor Hirohito's viewing of the destroyed areas of Tokyo in March 1945 is said to have been the beginning of his personal involvement in the peace process, culminating in Japan's surrender five months later.

==== Conventional bombing ====
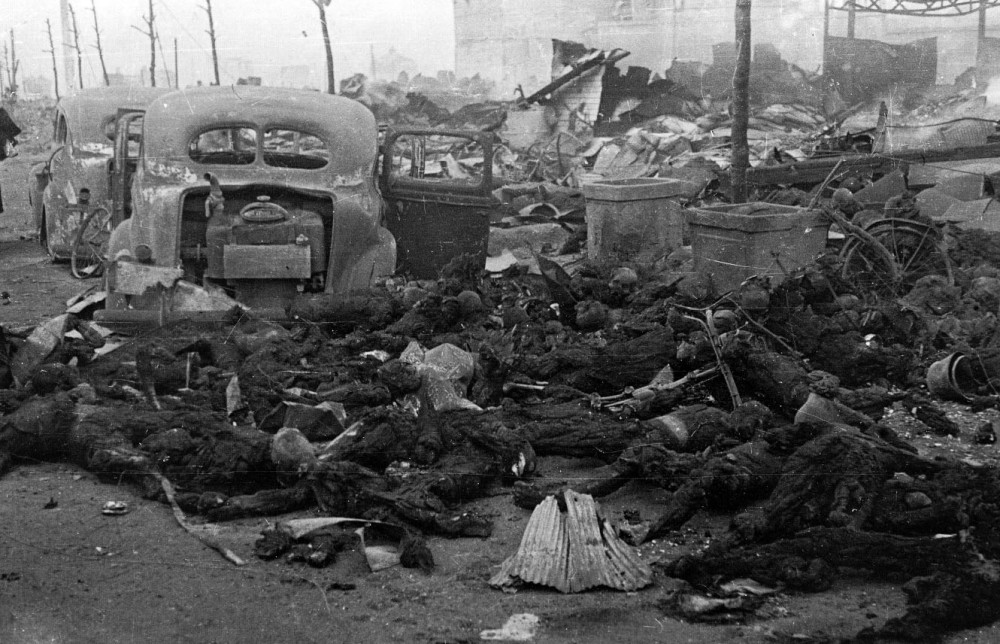
The partially incinerated remains of Japanese civilians in Tokyo, 10 March 1945

The first US raid on the Japanese main island was the Doolittle Raid of 18 April 1942, when sixteen B-25 Mitchells were launched from the USS Hornet (CV-8) to attack targets including Yokohama and Tokyo and then fly on to airfields in China. The raid was a military pinprick but a significant propaganda victory. Because they were launched prematurely, none of the aircraft had enough fuel to reach their designated landing sites, and so either crashed or ditched (except for one aircraft, which landed in the Soviet Union, where the crew was interned). Two crews were captured by the Japanese.

The key development for the bombing of Japan was the B-29 Superfortress, which had an operational range of 2,400 kilometres (1,500 mi); almost 90% of the bombs (147,000 tons) dropped on the home islands of Japan were delivered by this bomber. The first raid by B-29s on Japan was on 15 June 1944, from China. The B-29s took off from Chengdu, over 2,400 kilometres (1,500 mi) away. This raid was also not particularly effective: only forty-seven of the sixty-eight bombers hit the target area.

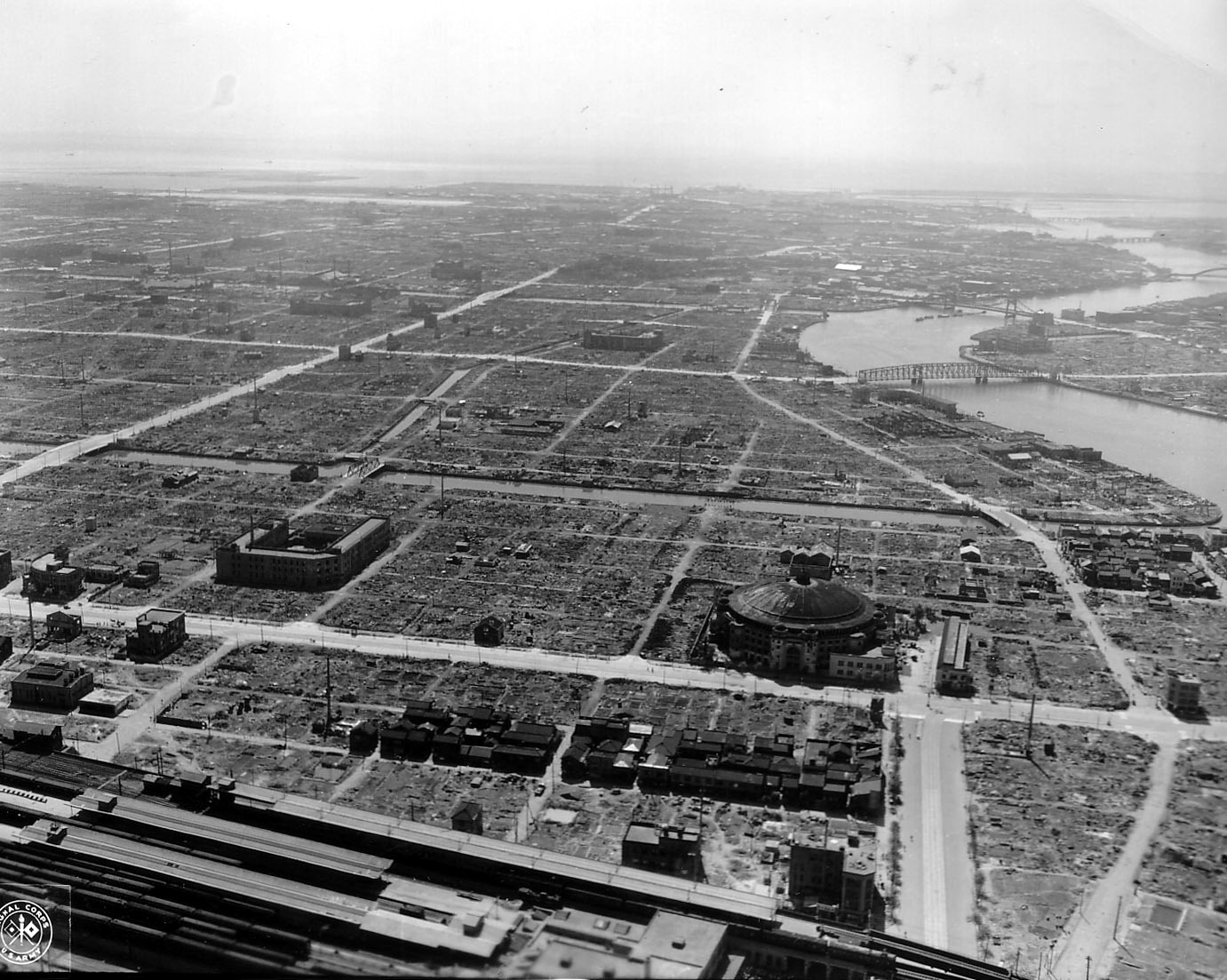
This postwar photograph shows the district of Sumida, Tokyo being virtually flattened.

Raids of Japan from mainland China, called Operation Matterhorn, were carried out by the Twentieth Air Force under XX Bomber Command. Initially the commanding officer of the Twentieth Air Force was Hap Arnold, and later Curtis LeMay. Bombing Japan from China was never a satisfactory arrangement because not only were the Chinese airbases difficult to supply—materiel being sent by air from India over "the Hump"—but the B-29s operating from them could only reach Japan if they traded some of their bomb load for extra fuel in tanks in the bomb-bays. When Admiral Chester Nimitz's island-hopping campaign captured Pacific islands close enough to Japan to be within the B-29's range, the Twentieth Air Force was assigned to XXI Bomber Command, which organized a much more effective bombing campaign of the Japanese home islands. Based in the Marianas (Guam and Tinian in particular), the B-29s were able to carry their full bomb loads and were supplied by cargo ships and tankers. The first raid from the Mariana was on 24 November 1944, when 88 aircraft bombed Tokyo. The bombs were dropped from around 30,000 feet (10,000 m) and it is estimated that only around 10% hit their targets.

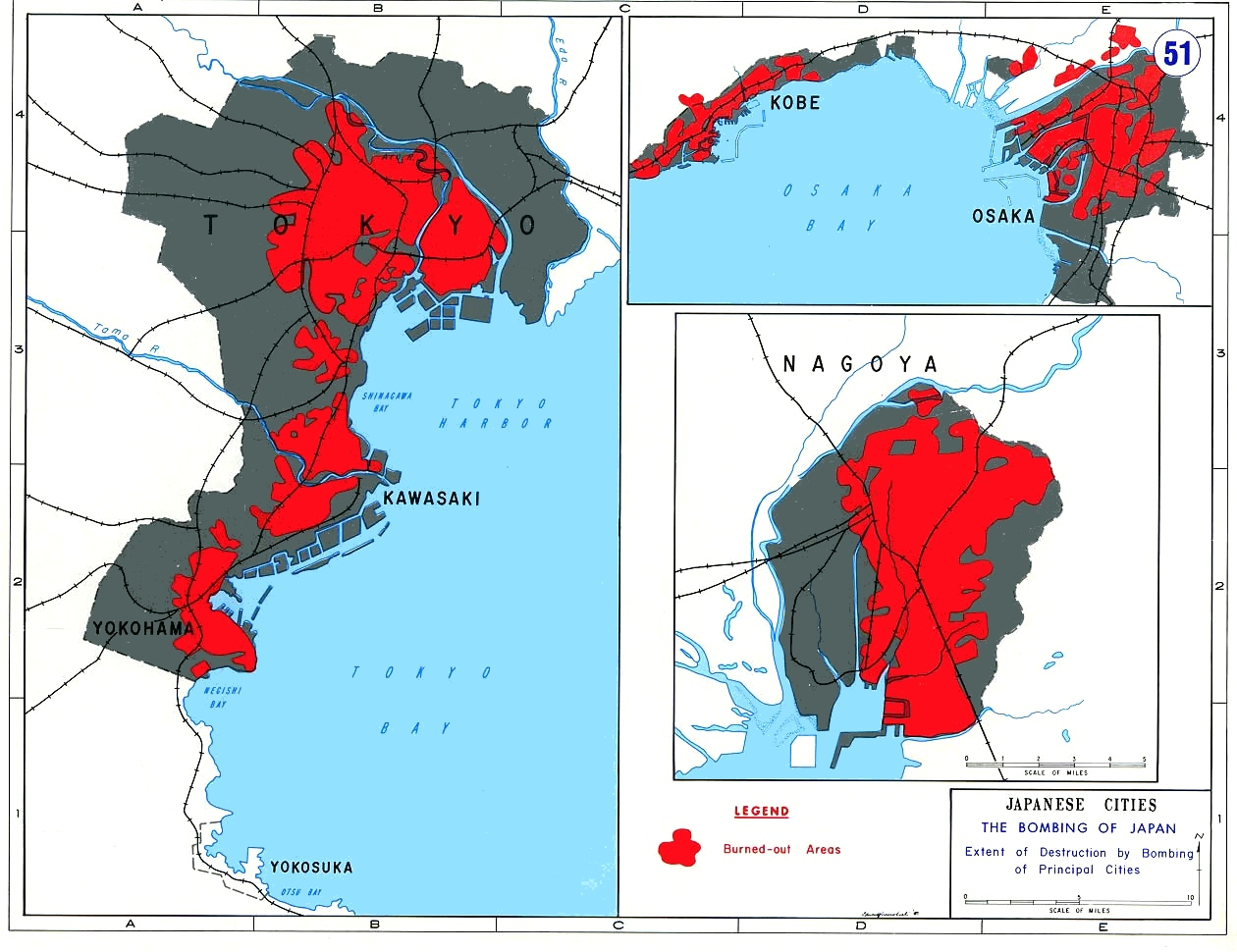
Conventional bombs from B-29s destroyed over 40% of the urban area in Japan's six greatest industrial cities.

Unlike all other forces in theater, the USAAF Bomber Commands did not report to the commanders of the theaters but directly to the Joint Chiefs of Staff. In July 1945, they were placed under the US Strategic Air Forces in the Pacific, which was commanded by Carl Spaatz.

As in Europe, the United States Army Air Forces (USAAF) tried daylight precision bombing. However, it proved to be impossible due to the weather around Japan, "during the best month for bombing in Japan, visual bombing was possible for [just] seven days. The worst had only one good day." Further, bombs dropped from a great height were tossed about by high winds.

General LeMay, commander of XXI Bomber Command, instead switched to mass firebombing night attacks from altitudes of around 7,000 feet (2,100 m) on the major conurbations. "He looked up the size of the large Japanese cities in the World Almanac and picked his targets accordingly." Priority targets were Tokyo, Nagoya, Osaka, and Kobe. Despite limited early success, particularly against Nagoya, LeMay was determined to use such bombing tactics against the vulnerable Japanese cities. Attacks on strategic targets also continued in lower-level daylight raids.

The first successful firebombing raid was on Kobe on 3 February 1945, and following its relative success the USAAF continued the tactic. Nearly half of the principal factories of the city were damaged, and production was reduced by more than half at one of the port's two shipyards.

The first raid of this type on Tokyo was on the night of 23–24 February when 174 B-29s destroyed around 2.6 square kilometres (1 mi^{2}). Following on that success, as Operation Meetinghouse, 334 B-29s raided on the night of 9–10 March, of which 282 Superforts reached their targets, dropping around 1,700 tons of bombs. Around 41 square kilometres (16 mi^{2}) of the city was destroyed and over 100,000 people are estimated to have died in the fire storm. It was the most destructive conventional raid, and the deadliest single bombing raid of any kind in terms of lives lost, in all of military aviation history, even when the missions on Hiroshima and Nagasaki are taken as single events. The city was made primarily of wood and paper, and the fires burned out of control. The effects of the Tokyo firebombing proved the fears expressed by Admiral Yamamoto in 1939: "Japanese cities, being made of wood and paper, would burn very easily. The Army talks big, but if war came and there were large-scale air raids, there's no telling what would happen."

In the following two weeks, there were almost 1,600 further sorties against the four cities, destroying 80 square kilometres (31 mi^{2}) in total at a cost of 22 aircraft. By June, over 40% of the urban area of Japan's largest six cities (Tokyo, Nagoya, Kobe, Osaka, Yokohama, and Kawasaki) was devastated. LeMay's fleet of nearly 600 bombers destroyed tens of smaller cities and manufacturing centres in the following weeks and months.

Leaflets were dropped over cities before they were bombed, warning the inhabitants and urging them to escape the city. Though many, even within the Air Force, viewed this as a form of psychological warfare, a significant element in the decision to produce and drop them was the desire to assuage American anxieties about the extent of the destruction created by this new war tactic. Warning leaflets were also dropped on cities not in fact targeted, to create uncertainty and absenteeism.

A year after the war, the US Strategic Bombing Survey reported that American military officials had underestimated the power of strategic bombing combined with naval blockade and previous military defeats to bring Japan to unconditional surrender without invasion. By July 1945, only a fraction of the planned strategic bombing force had been deployed yet there were few targets left worth the effort. In hindsight, it would have been more effective to use land-based and carrier-based air power to strike merchant shipping and begin aerial mining at a much earlier date so as to link up with effective submarine anti-shipping campaign and completely isolate the island nation. This would have accelerated the strangulation of Japan and perhaps ended the war sooner. A postwar Naval Ordnance Laboratory survey agreed, finding naval mines dropped by B-29s had accounted for 60% of all Japanese shipping losses in the last six months of the war. In October 1945, Prince Fumimaro Konoe said the sinking of Japanese vessels by US aircraft combined with the B-29 aerial mining campaign were just as effective as B-29 attacks on industry alone, though he admitted, "the thing that brought about the determination to make peace was the prolonged bombing by the B-29s." Prime Minister Baron Kantarō Suzuki reported to US military authorities it "seemed to me unavoidable that in the long run Japan would be almost destroyed by air attack so that merely on the basis of the B-29s alone I was convinced that Japan should sue for peace."

==== Nuclear bombings ====
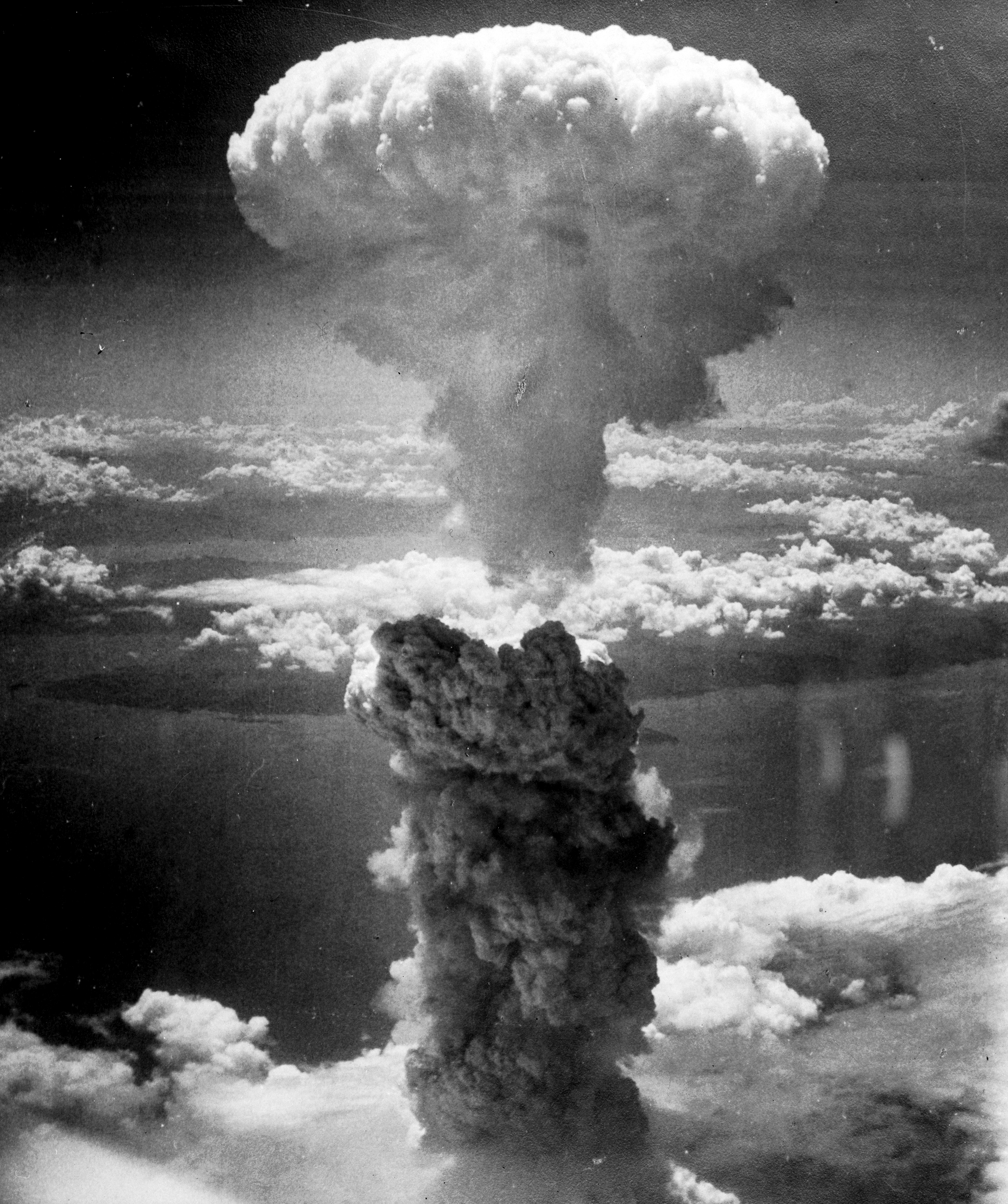
The mushroom cloud of the atomic bombing of Nagasaki, Japan, 1945, rose some 18 km (11 mi) above the hypocentre.

While the bombing campaign against Japan continued, the US and its allies were preparing to invade the Japanese home islands, which they anticipated to be heavily costly in terms of life and property. On 1 April 1945, US troops invaded the island of Okinawa and fought there fiercely against not only enemy soldiers, but also enemy civilians. After two and a half months, 12,000 US servicemen, 107,000 Japanese soldiers, and over 150,000 Okinawan civilians (included those forced to fight) were killed. Given the casualty rate in Okinawa, American commanders realized a grisly picture of the intended invasion of mainland Japan. When President Harry S. Truman was briefed on what would happen during an invasion of Japan, he could not afford such a horrendous casualty rate, added to over 400,000 US servicemen who had already died fighting in both the European and Pacific theaters of the war.

Hoping to forestall the invasion, the United States, the United Kingdom, and China issued a Potsdam Declaration on 26 July 1945, demanding that the Japanese government accept an unconditional surrender. The declaration also stated that if Japan did not surrender, it would be faced with "prompt and utter destruction", a process which was already underway with the incendiary bombing raids destroying 40% of targeted cities, and by naval warfare isolating and starving Japan of imported food. The Japanese government ignored (mokusatsu) this ultimatum, thus signalling that they were not going to surrender.

In the wake of this rejection, Stimson and George Marshall (the Army chief of staff) and Hap Arnold (head of the Army Air Forces) set the atomic bombing in motion.

On 6 August 1945, the B-29 bomber Enola Gay flew over the Japanese city of Hiroshima in southwest Honshū and dropped a gun-type uranium-235 atomic bomb (code-named Little Boy by the US) on it. Two other B-29 aircraft were airborne nearby for the purposes of instrumentation and photography. When the planes first approached Hiroshima, Japanese anti-aircraft units in the city initially thought they were reconnaissance aircraft, since they were ordered not to shoot at one or few aircraft that did not pose a threat, in order to conserve their ammunition for large-scale air raids. The bomb killed roughly 90,000–166,000 people; half of these died quickly while the other half suffered lingering deaths. The death toll included an estimated 20,000 Korean slave laborers and 20,000 Japanese soldiers and destroyed 48,000 buildings (including the headquarters of the Second General Army and Fifth Division). On 9 August, three days later, the B-29 Bockscar flew over the Japanese city of Nagasaki in northwest Kyushu and dropped an implosion-type, plutonium-239 atomic bomb (code-named Fat Man by the US) on it, again accompanied by two other B-29 aircraft for instrumentation and photography. This bomb's effects killed roughly 39,000–80,000 people, including roughly 23,000–28,000 Japanese war industry employees, an estimated 2,000 Korean forced workers, and at least 150 Japanese soldiers. The bomb destroyed 60% of the city. The industrial damage in Nagasaki was high, partly owing to the inadvertent targeting of the industrial zone, leaving 68–80% of the non-dock industrial production destroyed.

Six days after the detonation over Nagasaki, Hirohito announced Japan's surrender to the Allies on 15 August 1945, signing the Instrument of Surrender on 2 September 1945, officially ending the Pacific War and World War II. The two atomic bombings generated strong sentiments in Japan against all nuclear weapons. Japan adopted the Three Non-Nuclear Principles, which forbade the nation from developing nuclear armaments. Across the world anti-nuclear activists have made Hiroshima the central symbol of what they are opposing.

== See also ==
- Amerika bomber
- Civilian casualties of strategic bombing
- Defense of the Reich, the strategic defensive aerial campaign fought by the German Luftwaffe over Germany and German-occupied Europe
- Emergency Fighter Program
- List of Polish cities damaged in World War II
- List of strategic bombing over Germany in World War II
- Bombing of Wiener Neustadt in World War II
- The Blitz
- Air raids on Japan
- Operation Starvation, the American naval mining of Japanese water routes and ports conducted by the Army Air Forces
- Bombing of Guernica, the bombing of the Spanish city of Guernica carried out by the German Condor Legion during the Spanish Civil War
