= Plan for Completion of Combined Bomber Offensive =

The Plan for Completion of [the] Combined Bomber Offensive was a strategic bombing recommendation made by HQ USSTAF for the Allies of World War II to target Axis petroleum/oil/lubrication (POL) targets prior to the Normandy Landings.

== The Plan ==
The plan was commissioned by a February 12, 1944 memorandum from F. L. Anderson (Deputy Commander, Operations) to include the following "By command of Lieutenant General SPAATZ":

a. Summary of the Status of the CBO
b. Study of Possible Target systems and Operational Policies.
c. Study of the Possibilities of Heavy Bomber Participation in Direct Support of OVERLORD.
d. Plans Supplementing the Combined Bomber Offensive Plan:

(1) For continuing the Strategic Air Offensive after destruction of GAF production.
(2) And for simultaneous support of OVERLORD in so far as conditions warrant at the moment. …

Spaatz (commander of the USAAF Eight Air Force) presented the plan to General Henry H. Arnold (Chief of the USAAF) on March 5, 1944. The plan stated that the operations to bring the German fighter force into a battle of attrition (operation Pointblank) instead of targeting industry "can best be achieved by attacks on objectives which are so vital to the German War Machine that they must defend them with everything they have, or face the rapid reduction of their military forces to impotence."

After the British Ministry of Economic Warfare and the U.S. Petroleum Attache endorsed the plan on March 6; Dwight D. Eisenhower decided on March 25, 1944, that the six months for priority bombing of oil facilities to have an effect on Operation Overlord was too long and instead, railway targets became the highest priority. This was carried out under the Transportation Plan.

== Results of the plan adoption ==
Large-scale bombing of oil targets was permitted after May 12, 1944; oil targets became the highest bombing priority on September 4, 1944; and the bombing of oil targets was the decisive bombardment strategy in the European Theatre of World War II.

== See also ==
- Oil Campaign chronology of World War II
