= Redl-Zipf =

Sub-camp of Mauthausen concentration camp (1943–1945)

Coordinates: 48°02′22″N 13°30′17″E

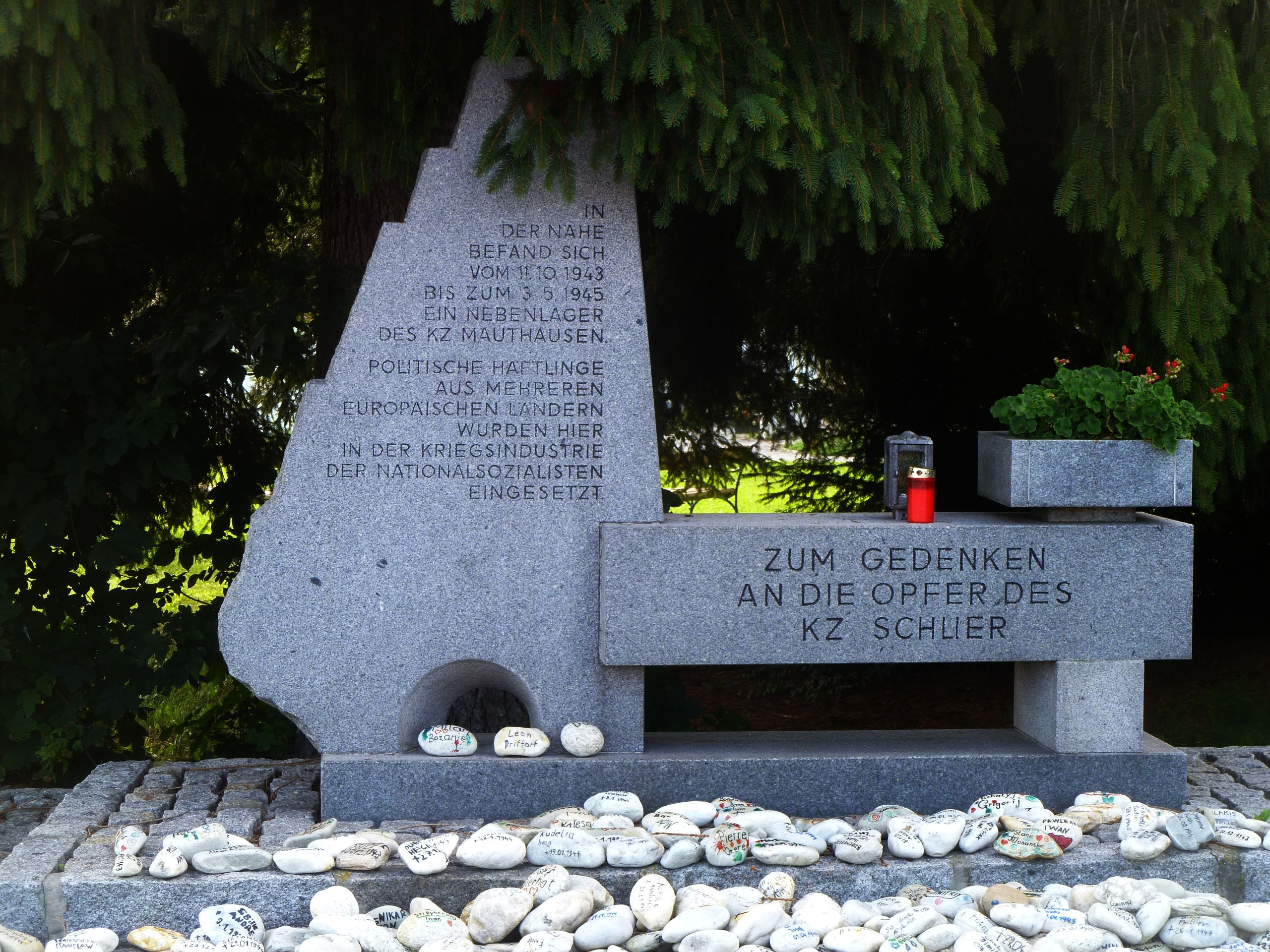
Redl-Zipf

The Redl-Zipf V-2 rocket facility (code name Schlier) located in central Austria between Vöcklabruck and Vöcklamarkt and established in September 1943 began operation for V-2 liquid oxygen production and rocket motor testing after oxygen machines originally earmarked for Raxwerke and combustion chamber test equipment from Friedrichshafen were moved there.

The facility tested V-2 combustion chambers' compatibility with turbopumps since the rocket did not have a controller for reducing the turbopumping of propellant into the chamber if pressure became too high. The World War II facility used as a starting base the cellars and storage tunnels of an old brewery. Construction of the facility was under the command of SS-Obergruppenführer Hans Kammler who was responsible for Nazi civil engineering projects and its top secret weapons programs and used forced labor from the Schlier-Redl-Zipf subcamp of the Mauthausen-Gusen concentration camp. The construction added a large number of tunnels and supporting structures and included a liquid oxygen generation plant in one of the tunnels.

A large explosion on 29 February 1944, killed 14 people, destroyed several installations, and halted production of liquid oxygen at the facility for almost two months. A report to Albert Speer indicated the cause of the explosion was a liquid oxygen leak and an open carbide lamp carried by the plant foreman. Another serious explosion at 12:29 PM on 28 August 1944, killed 27 people and caused significant damage to the facility. Among the 27 casualties was Ilse Oberth (1924–1944), the youngest daughter of rocket pioneer Hermann Julius Oberth. Ilse Oberth worked at the facility as a rocket technician and had arrived four months earlier on 28 April 1944. All of those killed in the explosion were given a state funeral and are interred at the Vöcklabruck-Schöndorf cemetery. After the August 1944 explosion, liquid oxygen production at the Schlier plant stopped once again which led to the establishment of a third V-2 liquid oxygen plant (5000 tons/month) at a slate quarry at Lehesten near the Mittelwerk (turbopump/chamber compatibility testing for Mittelwerk production was also performed at the Lehesten facility).

Karl Heimberg, who had worked at Peenemünde Test Stand 7, was transferred to "Vorwerk Süd" at Redl-Zipf and then, for the period from late 1944 to early April 1945, to Lehesten (he later returned to Peenemünde with Walter Riedel III to burn design office files and participated in the post-war Operation Backfire).

The Operation Bernhard forced labor team at Sachsenhausen concentration camp for producing counterfeit British money was transferred to the Schlier-Redl-Zipf subcamp until the beginning of May 1945, when the team of prisoners was ordered to transfer to the Ebensee concentration camp.
