= Combined Bomber Offensive =

Allied aerial bombing campaign of German infrastructure during later half of WWII

Combined Bomber Offensive (CBO) alias: Allied Bomber offensive
- Part of the Strategic bombing campaign in Europe
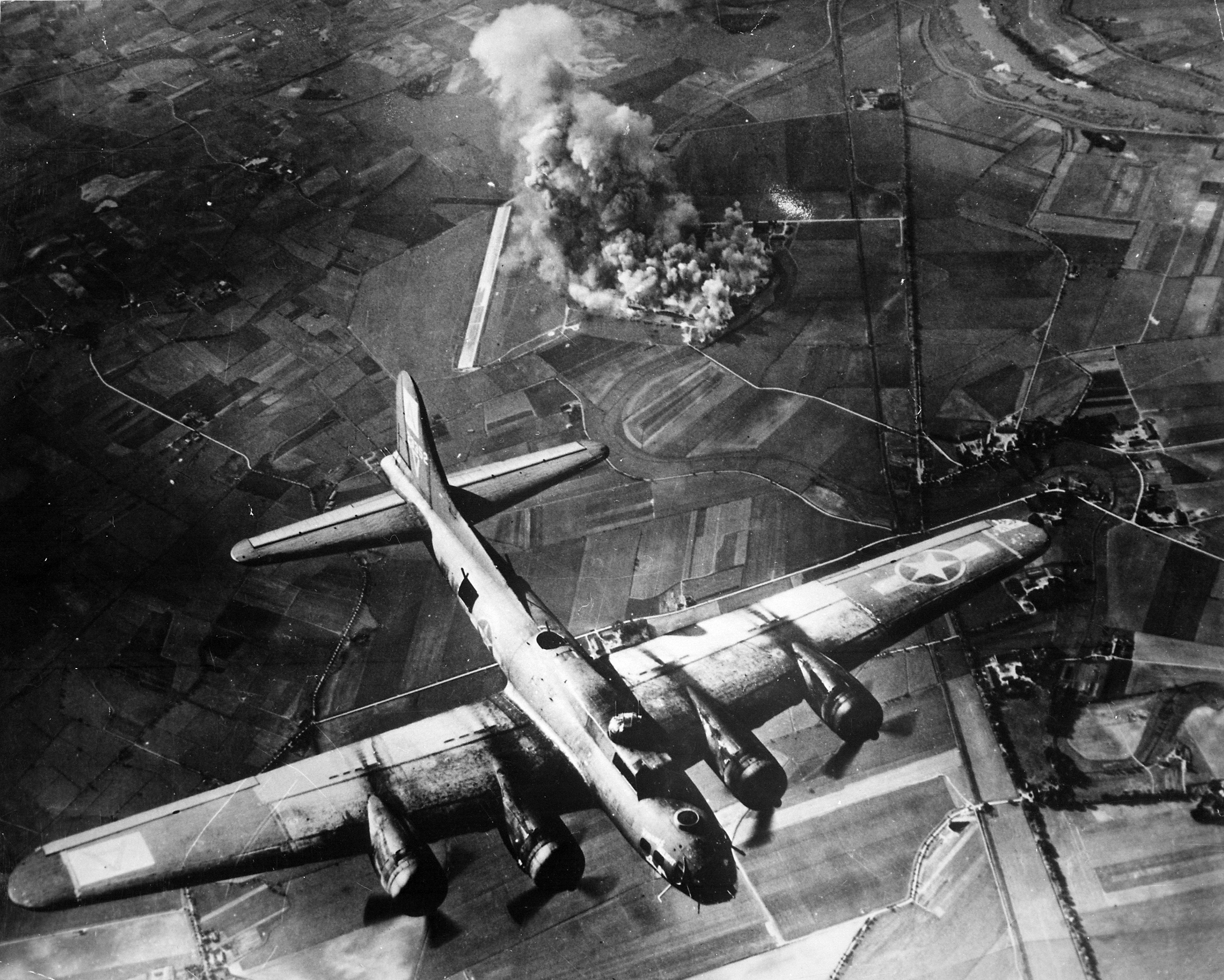
- 8th Air Force B-17 during raid of October 9, 1943 on the Focke-Wulf aircraft factory at Marienburg.
Date	June 10, 1943 – April 12, 1945
Location	European Theatre of World War II
Result	Allied victory

Belligerents
United Kingdom: Canada; Poland; (France) Free French Air Forces; United States	Germany

Commanders and leaders
(United Kingdom) Arthur Harris (United States) Carl Spaatz	(Nazi Germany) Hermann Göring

The Combined Bomber Offensive (CBO) was an Allied offensive of strategic bombing during World War II in Europe. The primary portion of the CBO was directed against Luftwaffe targets which were the highest priority from June 1943 to 1 April 1944. The subsequent highest priority campaigns were against V-weapon installations (June 1944) and petroleum, oil, and lubrication (POL) plants (September 1944). Additional CBO targets included railyards and other transportation targets, particularly prior to the invasion of Normandy and, along with army equipment, in the final stages of the war in Europe.

The British bombing campaign was chiefly waged by night by large numbers of heavy bombers until the latter stages of the war when German fighter defences were so reduced that daylight bombing was possible without risking large losses. The US effort was by day – massed formations of bombers with escorting fighters. Together they made up a round-the-clock bombing effort except where weather conditions prevented operations.

The Pointblank directive initiated the primary portion of the Allied Combined Bomber Offensive intended to cripple or destroy the German aircraft fighter strength, thus drawing it away from frontline operations and ensuring it would not be an obstacle to the invasion of Northwest Europe. The directive issued on 14 June 1943 ordered RAF Bomber Command and the U.S. Eighth Air Force to bomb specific targets such as aircraft factories; the order was confirmed at the Quebec Conference, 1943.

Up to that point the Royal Air Force and United States Army Air Forces had mostly been attacking German industry in their own way – the British by broad night attacks on industrial areas and the US in "precision attacks" on specific targets. The operational execution of the directive was left to the commanders of the forces and as such even after the directive the British continued in night attacks on the majority of the attacks on German fighter production.

== Casablanca directive ==
COA report "vital industries" and the CBO target types

1. single-engine fighter aircraft (22 targets)
2. ball bearings (10)
3. petroleum products (39)
4. grinding wheels and crude abrasives (10)
5. nonferrous metals (13)
6. synthetic rubber and rubber tires (12)
7. submarine construction plants and bases (27)
8. military transport vehicles (7)
9. transportation
10. coking plants (89)
11. iron and steel works (14)
12. machine tools (12)
13. electric power (55)
14. electrical equipment (16)
15. optical precision instruments (3)
16. chemicals
17. food (21)
18. nitrogen (21)
19. anti-aircraft and anti-tank artillery

Both the British and the US (through the Air War Plans Division) had drawn up their plans for attacking the Axis powers.

The British Ministry of Economic Warfare (MEW) published the Bombers' Baedeker in 1942 that identified the "bottleneck" German industries of oil, communications, and ball bearings; a second edition followed in 1944. At the January 1943 Casablanca Conference the Combined Chiefs of Staff agreed to conduct the "Bomber Offensive from the United Kingdom" and the British Air Ministry issued the Casablanca directive on 4 February with the object of:

The progressive destruction and dislocation of the German military, industrial and economic systems and the undermining of the morale of the German people to a point where their capacity for armed resistance is fatally weakened. Every opportunity to be taken to attack Germany by day to destroy objectives that are unsuitable for night attack, to sustain continuous pressure on German morale, to impose heavy losses on German day fighter force and to conserve German fighter force away from the Russian and Mediterranean theatres of war.

After initiating the preparation of a U.S. targeting plan on December 9, 1942; on March 24, 1943, General "Hap" Arnold, the USAAF Commander requested target information from the British, (Note: Letter to Portal in London, March 24, 1943 (the letter "included a report by Arnold's operations analysts about strategic targets in Europe" and was delivered by Col. C. P. Cabell, "It was ... a week before he took the letter to Portal, along with one signed by General Eaker") and the "Report of Committee of Operations Analysts" (Note: Col. Richard D. Hughes was Eaker's "target-selection specialist.") was submitted to Arnold on March 8, 1943 and then to the Eighth Air Force commander as well as the British Air Ministry, the MEW and the Royal Air Force (RAF) commander. The COA report recommended 18 operations during each three-month phase (12 in each phase were expected to be successful) against a total of 6 vulnerable target systems consisting of 76 specific targets. The six systems were 1) German submarine construction yards and bases, 2) German aircraft industry, 3) ball bearing manufacture, 4) oil production, 5) synthetic rubber and tires, and 6) military transport vehicle production. Using the COA report and information from the MEW, in April 1943 an Anglo-American committee (composed of British Chiefs of Staff and the American Joint Chiefs of Staff) under Lieutenant General Ira C. Eaker; led by Brigadier General Haywood S. Hansell, Jr.; and including Brig. Gen. Orvil A. Anderson completed a plan for the "Combined Bomber Offensive from the United Kingdom", which projected the US bomber strength for the four phases (944, 1,192, 1,746, & 2,702 bombers) through to 31 March 1944. Eaker added a summary and final changes (into the "Intermediate Objectives" section), such as:

If the growth of the German fighter strength is not arrested quickly, it may become literally impossible to carry out the destruction planned

== CBO Plan ==
1944 USAAF combined air-arms strategic bombing training film.

A committee under Eaker, led by Hansell and including Brig. Gen. Orvil A. Anderson, drew up a plan for Combined Bomber Operations. Finished in April 1943, the plan recommended 18 operations during each three-month phase (12 in each phase were expected to be successful) against 76 specific targets. The plan also projected the US bomber strength for the four phases (944, 1,192, 1,746, and 2,702 bombers) through 31 March 1944.

Eaker's "Combined Bomber Offensive Plan" was "a document devised to help Arnold get more planes and men (Note: The "Bradley Plan" was for Eighth Air Force troop build-up.) for the 8th Air Force" and not "designed to affect British operations in any substantive way." While the CBO Plan was being developed, the British independently drew up a plan in April 1943 entitled "The Attack on the GAF" which identified German fighter strength as "the most formidable weapon...against our bomber offensive" and advocated attacks on airfields and aircraft factories, The document recommended attacks on 34 airfields that were within range of the Rhubarb and Circus operations. The plan identified ten towns (Note: Bremen, Brunswick (Braunschweig), Kassel, Hamburg, Schweinfurt, Hanover, Stuttgart, Gotha, Eisenach and Oschersleben) as suitable for attack by high level daytime bombing followed by RAF night attacks and may have influenced target selection by the Eighth AF (and, later, the Ninth AF). The Combined Chiefs of Staff approved the "Eaker Plan" on May 19, 1943, and identified six specific "target systems" such as the German aircraft industry (including fighter strength):

1. Intermediate objectives

German fighter strength

2. Primary objectives:

German submarine yards and bases
The remainder of the German aircraft industry
Ball bearings
Oil (contingent upon attacks against Ploiești)

3. Secondary objectives:

Synthetic rubber and tires
Military motor transport vehicles

CBO committees
1942 December 9 onwards	US Committee of Operations Analysts
1943	Combined Operational Planning Committee
1943 July 21	Joint Crossbow Target Priorities Committee
1944 July 7	Joint Oil Targets Committee
1944 October	Combined Strategic Targets Committee

== Pointblank directive (PBD) ==
On 14 June 1943, the Combined Chiefs of Staff issued the Pointblank directive which modified the February 1943 Casablanca directive. Along with the single-engine fighters of the CBO plan, the highest priority Pointblank targets were the fighter aircraft factories since the Western Allied invasion of France could not take place without fighter superiority. In August 1943, the Quebec Conference upheld this change of priorities.

Among the factories listed were the Regensburg Messerschmitt factory (which would be attacked at high cost in August), the Schweinfurter Kugellagerwerke ball-bearing (attacked in October and also causing heavy USAAF losses) and the Wiener Neustädter Flugzeugwerke (WNF) which produced Bf 109 fighters.

== Beginning of operations ==
The Combined Bomber Offensive began on 10 June 1943 during the British bombing campaign against German industry in the Ruhr area known as the "Battle of the Ruhr". Pointblank operations against the "intermediate objective" began on 14 June, and the "Effects of Bombing Offensive on German War Effort" (J.I.C. (43) 294) by the Joint Intelligence Subcommittee was issued 22 July 1943.

The Germans built large-scale night-time decoys like the Krupp decoy site (German: Kruppsche Nachtscheinanlage) which was a German decoy-site of the Krupp steel works in Essen. During World War II, it was designed to divert Allied airstrikes from the actual production site of the arms factory.

Losses during the first months of Pointblank operations and lower-than-planned U.S. bomber production resulted in Chief of the Air Staff Sir Charles Portal complaining about the 3-month CBO delay at the Cairo Conference, where the British refused a U.S. request to place the CBO under a "single Allied strategic air commander," as they did not want to interfere with, nor be part of, a decision they deemed unwise and purely of American military origin. After Arnold submitted the October 9, 1943 "Plan to Assure the Most Effective Exploitation of the Combined Bomber Offensive" on October 22 the "Allied Joint Chiefs of Staff" signed orders to raid "the aircraft industries in the southern Germany and Austria regions".

July 1943 was the first time that the USAAF would coordinate a raid on the same location as the RAF. They were to fly two daylight missions against industrial targets (U-boat pens and yards) in Hamburg following the opening raid of the RAF campaign against Hamburg. However fires started by the night's bombing obscured the targets and the USAAF "were not keen to follow immediately on the heels of RAF raids in the future because of the smoke problem".

In October 1943 Air Chief Marshal Arthur Harris, C-in-C of RAF Bomber Command writing to his superior urged the British government to be honest to the public regarding the purpose of the bombing campaign and openly announce that:

the aim of the Combined Bomber Offensive...should be unambiguously and publicly stated. That aim is the destruction of German cities, the killing of German workers, and the disruption of civilized life throughout Germany.

It should be emphasized that the destruction of houses, public utilities, transport and lives, the creation of a refugee problem on an unprecedented scale, and the breakdown of morale both at home and at the battle fronts by fear of extended and intensified bombing, are accepted and intended aims of our bombing policy. They are not by-products of attempts to hit factories.

— Arthur Harris (1943)

On February 13, 1944, the CCS issued a new plan for the "Bomber Offensive", which no longer included German morale in the objective:

progressive destruction and dislocation of the German military, industrial and economic systems, the disruption of vital elements of lines of communication and the material reduction of German air combat strength, by the successful prosecution of the combined bomber offensive from all convenient bases.

Section 2, "Concept"
Overall reduction of German air combat strength in its factories, on the ground and in the air through mutually supporting attacks by both strategic air forces pursued with relentless determination against same target areas or systems so far as tactical conditions allow, in order to create the air situation most propitious for OVERLORD is immediate purpose of Bomber Offensive.

— Combined Chiefs of Staff, February 13, 1944

"The subject of morale had been dropped and [the number of cities with targets] gave me a wide range of choice. ... the new instructions therefore made no difference" to RAF Bomber Command operations (Arthur Harris). The February 13 plan was given the code name Argument, and after the weather became favorable on February 19, Argument operations were conducted during "Big Week" (February 20–25). Harris claimed the Argument plan was not "a reasonable operation of war", and the Air Staff had to order Harris to bomb the Pointblank targets at Schweinfurt.

In practice the USAAF bombers made large scale daylight attacks on factories involved in the production of fighter aircraft. The Luftwaffe was forced into defending against these raids, and its fighters were drawn into battle with the bombers and their escorts.

== Pointblank operations ==
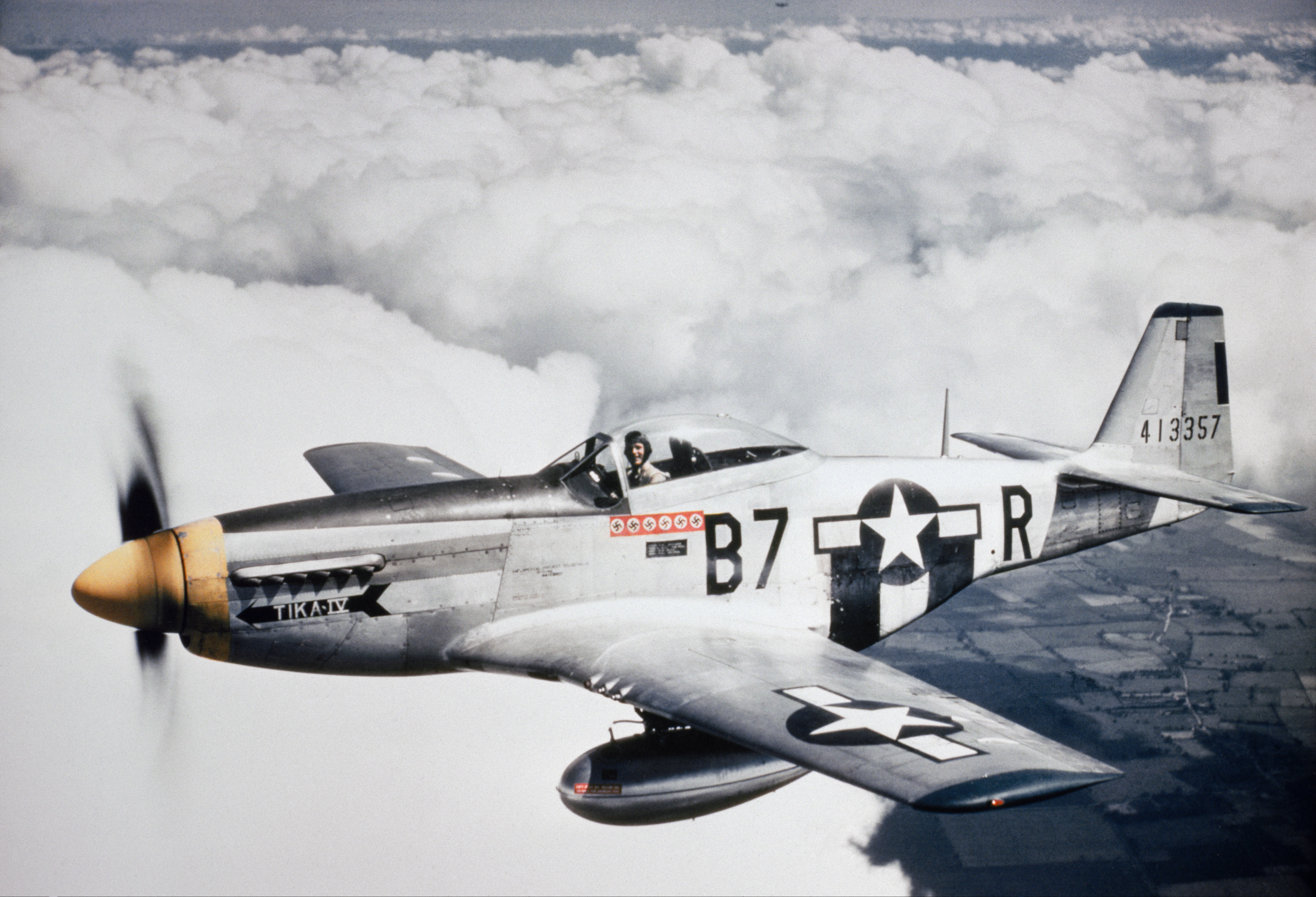
The North American P-51 Mustang fighter had both the range to escort bomber formations deep into Germany and the performance to take on German fighters.

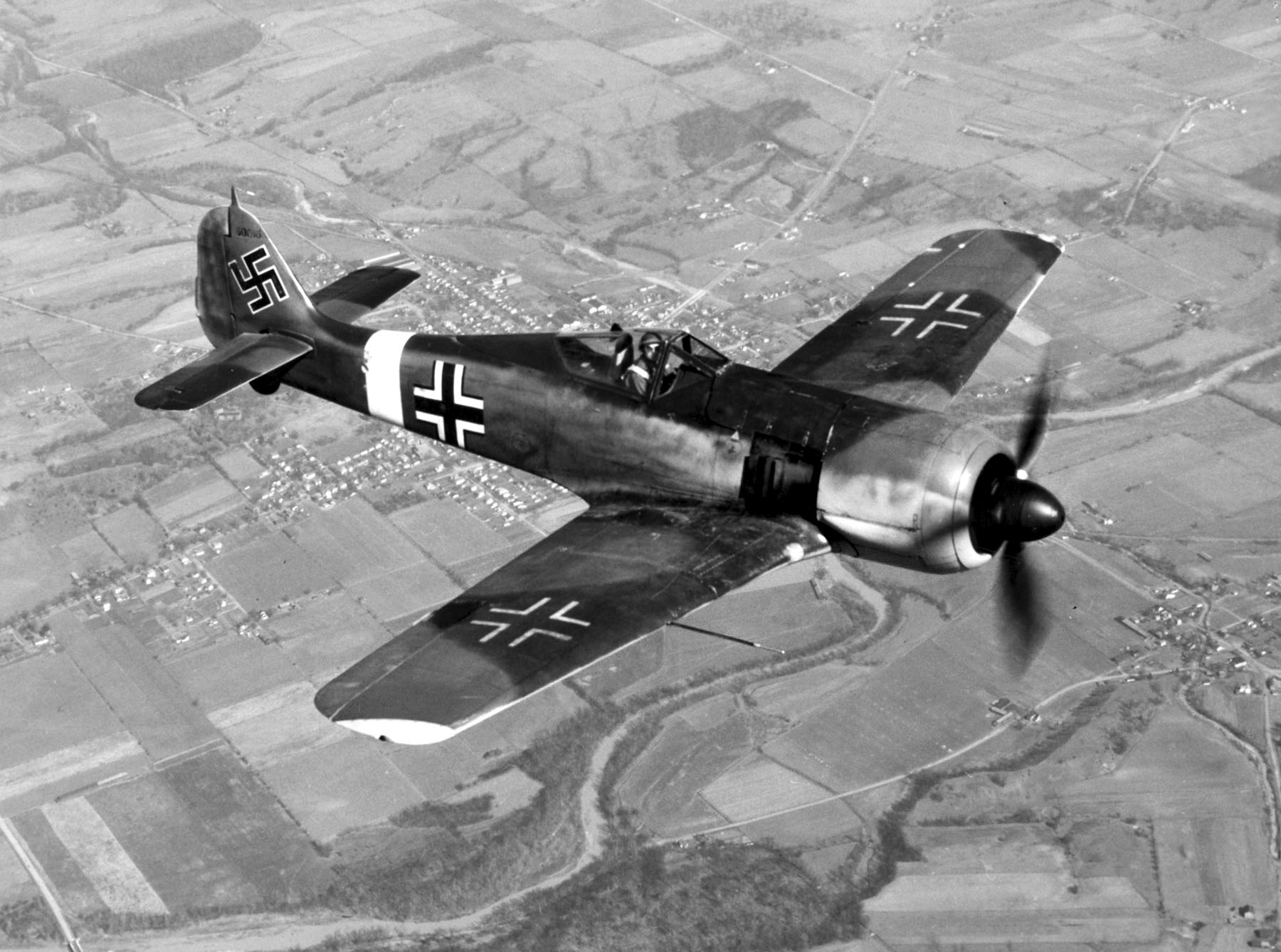
Focke Wulf Fw 190 single-engine fighter targeted by Pointblank.

Following the heavy losses (about a quarter of the aircraft) of "Black Thursday" (14 October 1943), the USAAF discontinued strikes deep into Germany until an escort was introduced that could follow the bombers to and from their targets. In 1944, the USAAF bombers—now escorted by Republic P-47 Thunderbolts and North American P-51 Mustangs—renewed their operation. Eaker gave the order to "Destroy the enemy air force wherever you find them, in the air, on the ground and in the factories."

Eaker was replaced at the start of 1944 as 8th Air Force commander by then-Major General Jimmy Doolittle (Note: Doolittle had first struck Japan in April 1942 with a force of 16 B-25 Mitchell bombers, partly to damage Japanese morale.) Doolittle's major influence on the European air war occurred in early 1944 when he changed USAAF policy which required escorting fighters to remain with the bombers at all times. With his permission, some of the American fighters on bomber escort missions would fly further ahead of the bombers' combat box formations with the intention of "clearing the skies" of any Luftwaffe fighter opposition heading towards the formations. This greater freedom for the fighters inflicted heavy losses on the less maneuverable Zerstörergeschwader ("destroyer wings") of twin-engined heavy fighters and their replacement, single-engined Sturmgruppen of heavily armed and armored Fw 190s, clearing each force of bomber destroyers from Germany's skies throughout early 1944. After the bombers had hit their targets, the USAAF fighters were then free to strafe German airfields and transport infrastructure when returning to base, contributing significantly to the achievement of air superiority by Allied air forces over Europe.

=== Big Week ===
Soon after Doolittle took command of the 8th Air Force, between February 20 and 25, 1944, as part of the Combined Bomber Offensive, the USAAF launched "Operation Argument", a series of missions against the Third Reich that became known as "Big Week". The Luftwaffe was lured into a decisive battle for air superiority through launching massive attacks by the bombers of the USAAF, protected by squadrons of Republic P-47 Thunderbolts and North American P-51 Mustangs, on the German aircraft industry. In defeating the Luftwaffe, the Allies achieved air superiority and the invasion of Western Europe could proceed.

=== Battle of Berlin ===
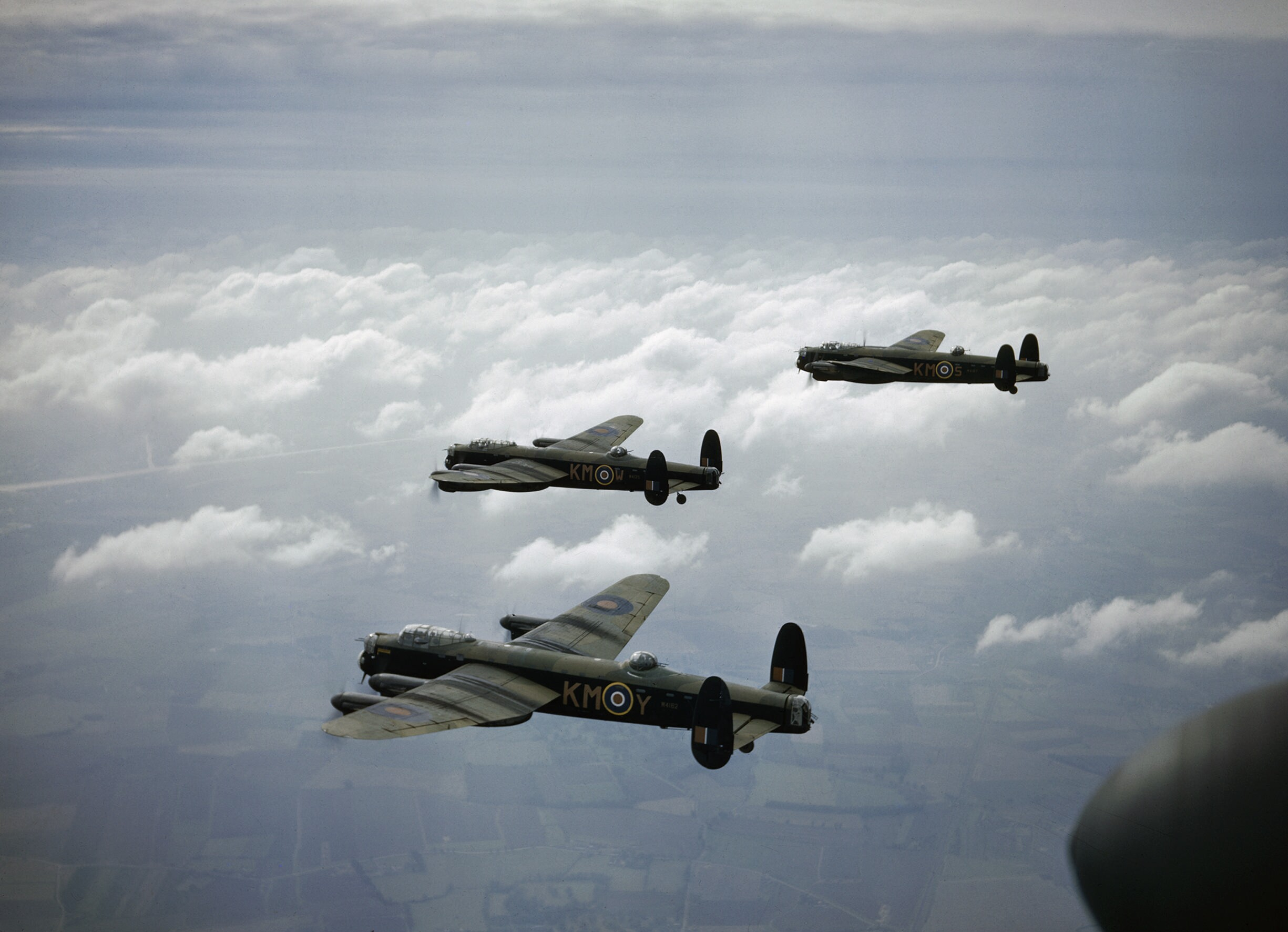
The Avro Lancaster was the main aircraft in service with RAF Bomber Command during the Battle of Berlin (Winter 1943/44).

The wording of both the Casablanca directive and the Pointblank directive allowed Harris sufficient leeway to continue the British campaign of night-time Area Bombardment against German industrial cities which targeted both the factories and - indirectly through destruction of housing - the factory workers.

Between 18 November 1943 and 31 March 1944, RAF Bomber Command fought the Battle of Berlin, a campaign of 16 major raids on the German capital, interspersed with many other major and minor raids across Germany to reduce the predictability of the British operations. In these 16 raids the RAF destroyed around 4,500 acres (18 km^{2}) of Berlin for the loss of 300 aircraft. (Note: Harris says that after the war the total damage to Berlin during the war was 6,380 acres, 500 before the Battle of Berlin, 1,000 by the Americans, and additional damage by Mosquito light bomber nuisance raids which is not quantified.) Harris had planned to reduce most of the city to rubble, break German morale and so win the war. During the period of the battle of Berlin, the British lost 1,047 bombers across all its bombing operations in Europe with a further 1,682 aircraft damaged, culminating in the disastrous raid on Nuremberg on 30 March 1944. The campaign did not achieve its strategic objective, and coupled with the RAF's unsustainable losses (7–12% of aircraft committed to the large raids), the official British historians identified it as an operational defeat for the RAF. At the end of Battle of Berlin, Harris was obliged to commit his heavy bombers to the Transport Plan attacks on lines of communications in France as part of the preparations for the Normandy Landings and the RAF would not return to begin the systematic destruction of Germany until the last quarter of 1944.

=== Pointblank outcome ===
Operation Pointblank showed that Germany's aircraft and ball bearings plants were not very vulnerable to air attack. Its production of synthetic rubber, ammunition, nitrogen, and ethyl fluid was concentrated in fewer factories and would likely have been much more vulnerable. Despite bombing, "German single-engine fighter production ... for the first quarter of 1944 was 30% higher than for the third quarter of 1943, which we may take as a base figure. In the second quarter of 1944, it doubled; by the third quarter of 1944, it had tripled, in a year's time. In September 1944, monthly German single-engine fighter production reached its wartime peak – 3031 fighter aircraft. Total German single-engine fighter production for 1944 reached the amazing figure of 25,860 ME-109s and FW-190s" (William R. Emerson). Following Operation Pointblank, Germany dispersed works of its aircraft industry across 729 medium and very small plants (some in tunnels, caves, and mines).

However, Operation Pointblank did help to diminish the Luftwaffe's threat against the Allies, and by the Normandy Landings, the Luftwaffe had only 80 operational aircraft on the North French Coast, which managed about 250 combat sorties against the 13,743 Allied sorties that day.

According to Charles Webster and Noble Frankland, Big Week and the subsequent attack on the aircraft industry reduced "the fighting capacity of the Luftwaffe" through threatening the bombing of strategic targets and "leaving the German fighters with no alternative other than to defend them" but "the combat was primarily fought and certainly won" by the US long range fighters.

== Overlord air plan ==
During the "winter campaign against the German aircraft industry ... January 11 [-] February 22, 1944", review began on the initial air plan for the Overlord which omitted the requirement "to seek air superiority before the landings were attempted." Instead, the plan was to bomb communications targets (primary) and rail yards and repair facilities (secondary). Air Marshal Trafford Leigh-Mallory, who would command the tactical element of the invasion air forces had been assigned the responsibility on June 26, 1943, for drafting the plan, and at the February 14, 1944, meeting regarding the Overlord air plan, he claimed German fighters would defend and be defeated during the attacks on rail yards, and if not, air superiority would instead be won over the D-Day beaches. Harris rebutted that even after the planned rail attacks, German rail traffic would be sufficient to supply invasion defenses; and Spaatz proposed attacks on industry in Germany to require fighters to be moved away from the Overlord beaches to defend the plants. Tedder concluded that a committee needed to study the pre-Overlord targeting, but when the committee met in March, no consensus was reached.

On March 25, 1944 Portal chaired a meeting of the generals and restated the Pointblank objective of air superiority was still the highest CBO priority. Although the "Joint Chiefs of Staff" had previously argued that it was impossible to impede German military rail traffic due to the large reserve capacity, for the secondary priority Portal identified that pre-invasion railyard attacks only needed to reduce traffic so tactical airpower could inhibit enemy defenses during the first 5 weeks of OVERLORD. Sir John Kennedy and Andrew Noble countered that the military fraction of rail traffic was so small that no amount of railyard bombing would significantly impact operations. As endorsed on March 6 by the MEW and the U.S. Mission for Economic Affairs, Spaatz again proposed that "execution of the oil plan would force the enemy to reduce oil consumption ... and ... fighting power" during Overlord. Although "concerned that military transportation experts of the British Army had not been consulted" about the Transportation Plan, Eisenhower decided that "apart from the attack on the GAF [German Air Force] the transportation plan was the only one which offered a reasonable chance of the air forces making an important contribution to the land battle during the first vital weeks of Overlord". Control of all air operations was transferred to Eisenhower on April 14 at noon.

General Carl Spaatz had been insistent—and correct. The enemy would fight for oil, and the enemy would lose his fighters, his crews, and his fuel.

— USAF historian Herman S. Wolk, June 1974

However, after "very few German fighters rose to contest the early attacks on French rail yards" and the Ninth (tactical) AAF in England had dropped 33,000 tons of bombs through April on French railway targets, Churchill wrote to Roosevelt in May 1944 that he was not "convinced of the wisdom of this plan" Although Tedder's original Overlord air directive in mid-April listed no oil targets, Eisenhower permitted Spaatz to test that the Luftwaffe would defend oil targets more heavily. During the trial raids of May 12 and May 28, German fighters heavily defended the oil targets, and after the invasion had not begun during the good weather of May, Luftwaffe fighters in France were recalled to defend Reich industry. The German plan was to await the invasion and then, "on the cue words 'Threatening Danger West'," redeploy fighter strength back to unused French air bases when needed against the invasion. The last two Jagdgeschwader 26 Fw 190As, piloted by Josef Priller and his wingman Heinz Wodarczyk, that were to be recalled conducted two of the very sparse Luftwaffe day sorties over the Normandy beaches on D-day, and on June 7/8 the Luftwaffe began redeploying c. 600 aircraft to France for attacking the Normandy bridgehead.

Pointblank operations ended on the fifth day of the Invasion. and the highest priority of the Combined Bomber Offensive became operations against the German rocket weapons in June 1944 and the Oil Campaign in September. Tedder's proposal to keep oil targets as the highest priority and place "Germany's rail system in second priority" was approved by the CSTC on November 1. On April 12, 1945, Strategic Bombing Directive No. 4 ended the strategic bombing campaign in Europe.

== See also ==
- Operation Crossbow
- Oil campaign of World War II
- Transport Plan

== Notes ==
Notes

Citations
