= V-2 rocket facilities =

V-2 rocket facilities may refer to:

- V-2 rocket facilities of World War II used by Nazi Germany
- Krupp artillery range used for the post-war British Operation Backfire tests
- White Sands Proving Ground, the western United States post-war test facility
- Kapustin Yar, the post-war USSR test facility
- Cape Canaveral, the post-war facility for a few of the last US test launches (e.g., the Bumper rocket)
- USS Midway (CV-41), the aircraft carrier used for Operation Sandy near Bermuda
