= Bombing of Wiener Neustadt in World War II =

Wiener Neustadt World War II bombings
- Part of Strategic bombing campaigns in Europe
Date	1941-1945
Location	Austria

Belligerents
(United States) USAAF (United Kingdom) RAF Bomber Command	(Nazi Germany) Luftwaffe

Wiener Neustadt, a city in Austria, was the target of bombing raids during World War II by the Allies.

== Background ==
The targets in and around Wiener Neustadt included the marshalling yards, the Wiener Neustädter Flugzeugwerke (WNF) aircraft factory (effectively an extension of Messerschmitt) and the Raxwerke plants of Wiener Neustädter Lokomotivfabrik (two of which used forced labor from the Mauthausen-Gusen concentration camp).

The three WNF plants (W.N.F. Fischamend, W.N.F. Klagenfurt, W.N.F. Bad Vöslau) were targets of the Combined Bomber Offensive against the German aircraft industry. WNF manufactured Messerschmitt Bf 109 fighters and repaired Junkers bombers and heavy fighters (German: Zerstörer). The Hirtenberger Patronen Zündhütchen und Metallwarenfabrik was an ammunition factory nearby.

attacks on Wiener Neustadt
Date	Target	Notes
August 13, 1943		61 B-24 Liberators in the first Ninth Air Force raid on Austria (using bombers on loan from the 8AF surviving from Operation Tidal Wave) targeted the Wiener-Neustadt aircraft factory as part of the B-24 part of Operation Juggler postponed from August 7.
October 1, 1943		73 B-24's based at Oudna Air Base outside of Tunis, Tunisia, temporarily on loan from the Eighth Air Force bombed the Wiener Neustadt Bf 109 factory.
November 2, 1943		The first mission by the US Fifteenth Air Force targeting the nearby Messerschmitt plant, including the 99th Bombardment Group on a 1,600 mile round trip, dropped 312 tons and hit the Raxwerke.
February 20–25, 1944		Operations during Big Week destroyed 200 aircraft at the Bf 109 plants in Wiener-Neustadt.
March 7, 1944		The 317th Bombardment Squadron bombed the Wiener Neustadt aircraft factory.
April 23, 1944		The 317th BS bombed the Wiener Neustadt aircraft factory.
May 9, 1944		The 464th Bombardment Group bombed an aircraft factory.
May 10, 1944		The 97th BG bombed an aircraft factory at Wiener Neustadt after the other groups turned back because of bad weather. Of 31 aircraft, 5 were shot down (including the B-17 Flying Fortress of Jacob E. Smart), and the unit earned the Distinguished Unit Citation.
May 24, 1944		The 317th BS bombed the Wiener Neustadt aircraft factory, and the 456th BG bombed "Wöllersdorf Air Drome Stores and Machine Shops".
May 29, 1944		The 32nd BS bombed the Wiener Neustadt Wollersdorf AID.. "Successful attacks on [the] Wiener-Neustadter complex have raised oil to high priority" (allied intelligence annex to a May 31 bombing order). WNF Bad Vöslau manufactured Bf 109 components and was undamaged as of March 5, 1944.
December 27, 1944	marshalling yard	
February 15, 1945	main station	The 485 BG bombed the main station.
March 12, 1945	marshalling yards	B-24s and B-17s bombed the Floridsdorf oil refinery and Wiener-Neustadt marshalling yards.
March 14, 1945		George McGovern was one of the pilots who bombed the alternate target, the Wiener Neustadt marshaling yards, instead of the Vienna oil refinery.
March 15, 1945		109 B-17s bombed the oil refinery at Ruhland (the Fifteenth's deepest penetration into Germany); 103 others bomb the alternate target, the refinery at Kolin, Czechoslovakia. More than 470 bombers attacked targets in Austria, including Moosbierbaum, Schwechat, and Vienna/Floridsdorf oil refineries, and the marshalling yards at Wiener-Neustadt.
March 16, 1945	marshalling yards	The 47th Bomb Wing (H) 450th Group bombed the marshalling yards using a B-24. 238 x 500 lb G.P. bombs dropped. 197 bursts plotted. Altitude 21,140'.
March 20, 1945		760+ B-17s and B-24s, with fighter escort, bombed the Korneuburg and Kagran oil refineries in Austria, the tank works at Steyr, and marshalling yards at Wels, Sankt Pölten, Amstetten, Wiener-Neustadt, & Klagenfurt
March 26, 1945		The 32nd BS bombed the marshalling yards.
