= Wiener Neustadt =

City in Lower Austria, Austria

- Statutory city
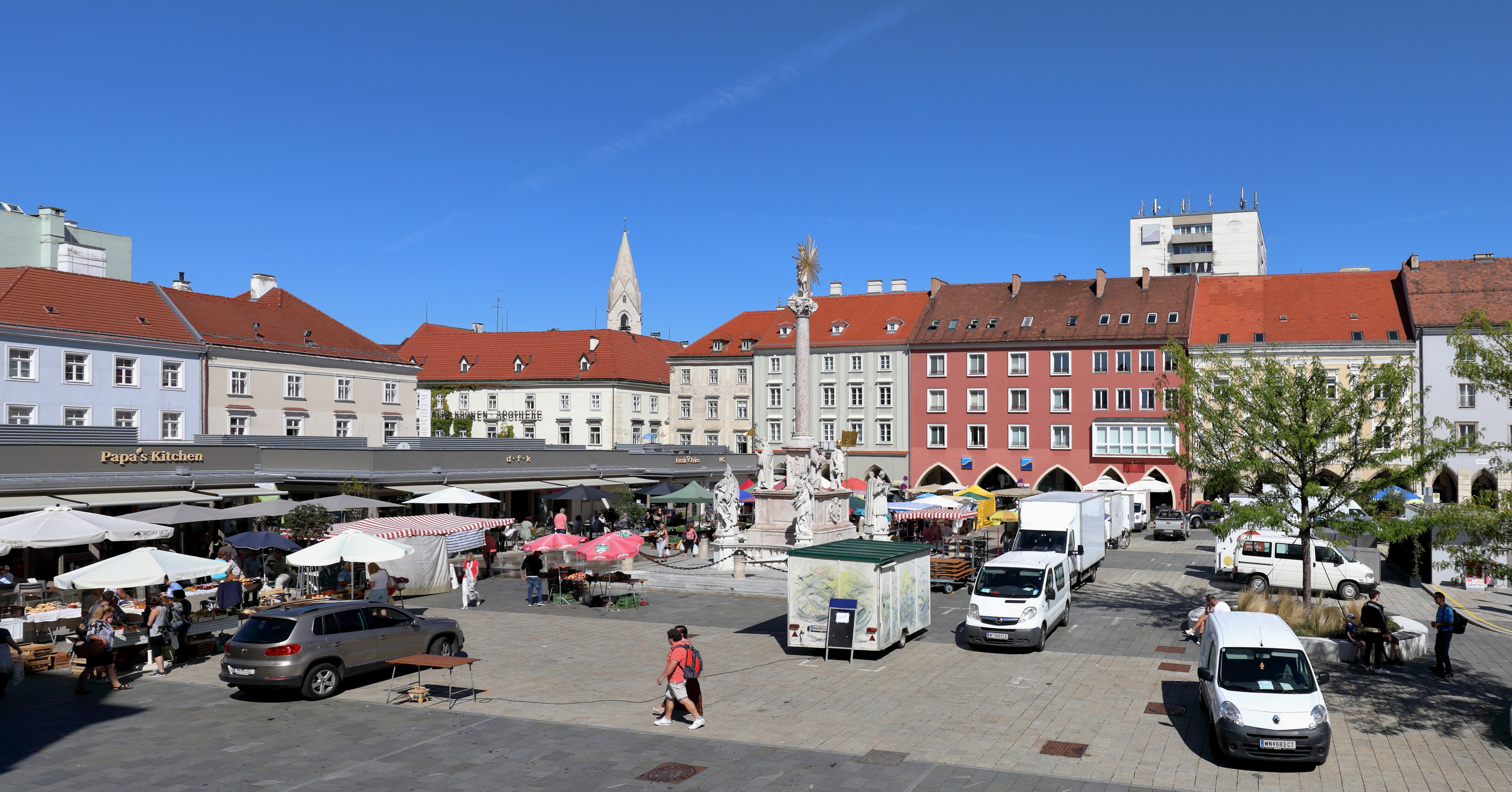
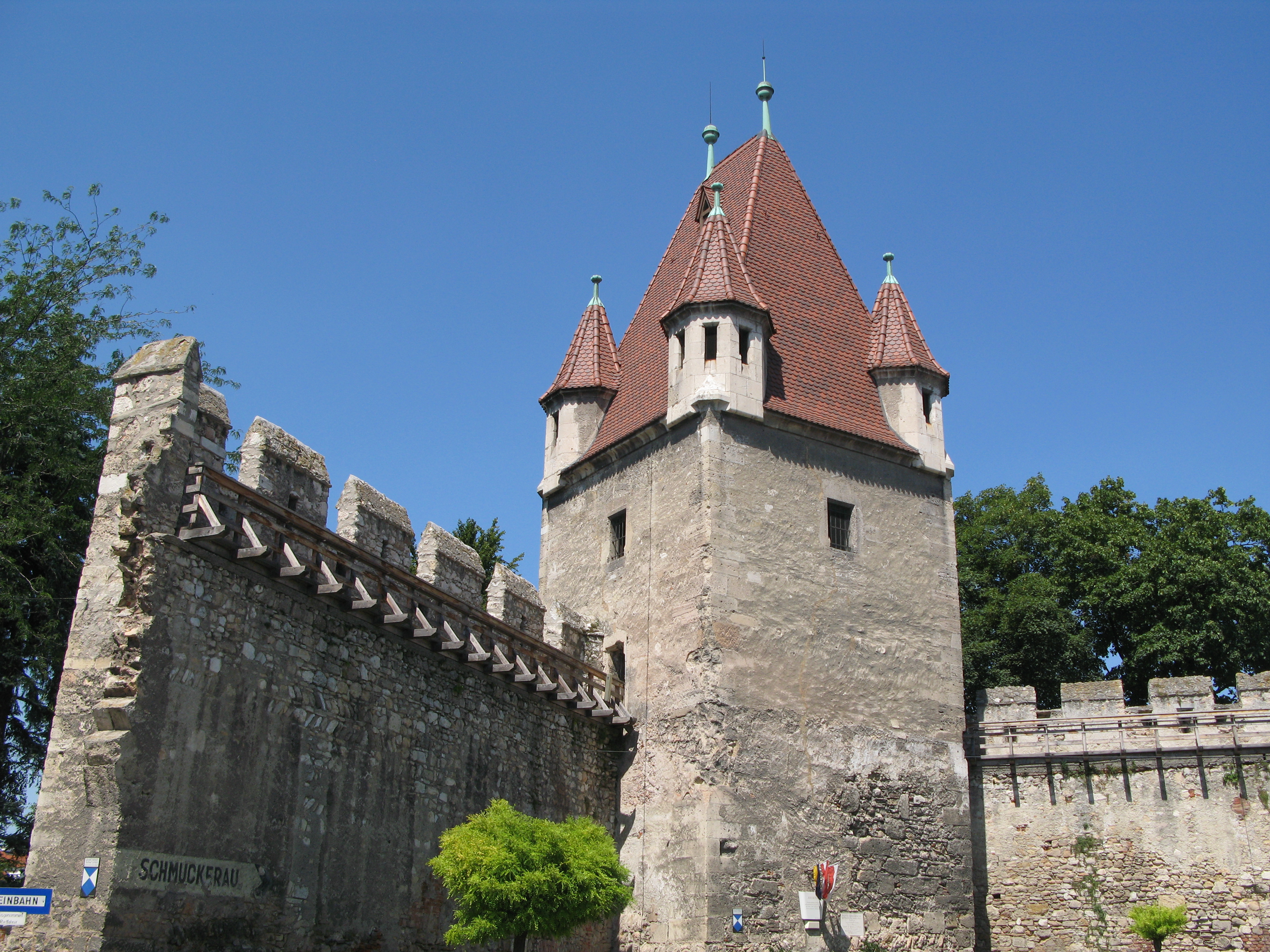
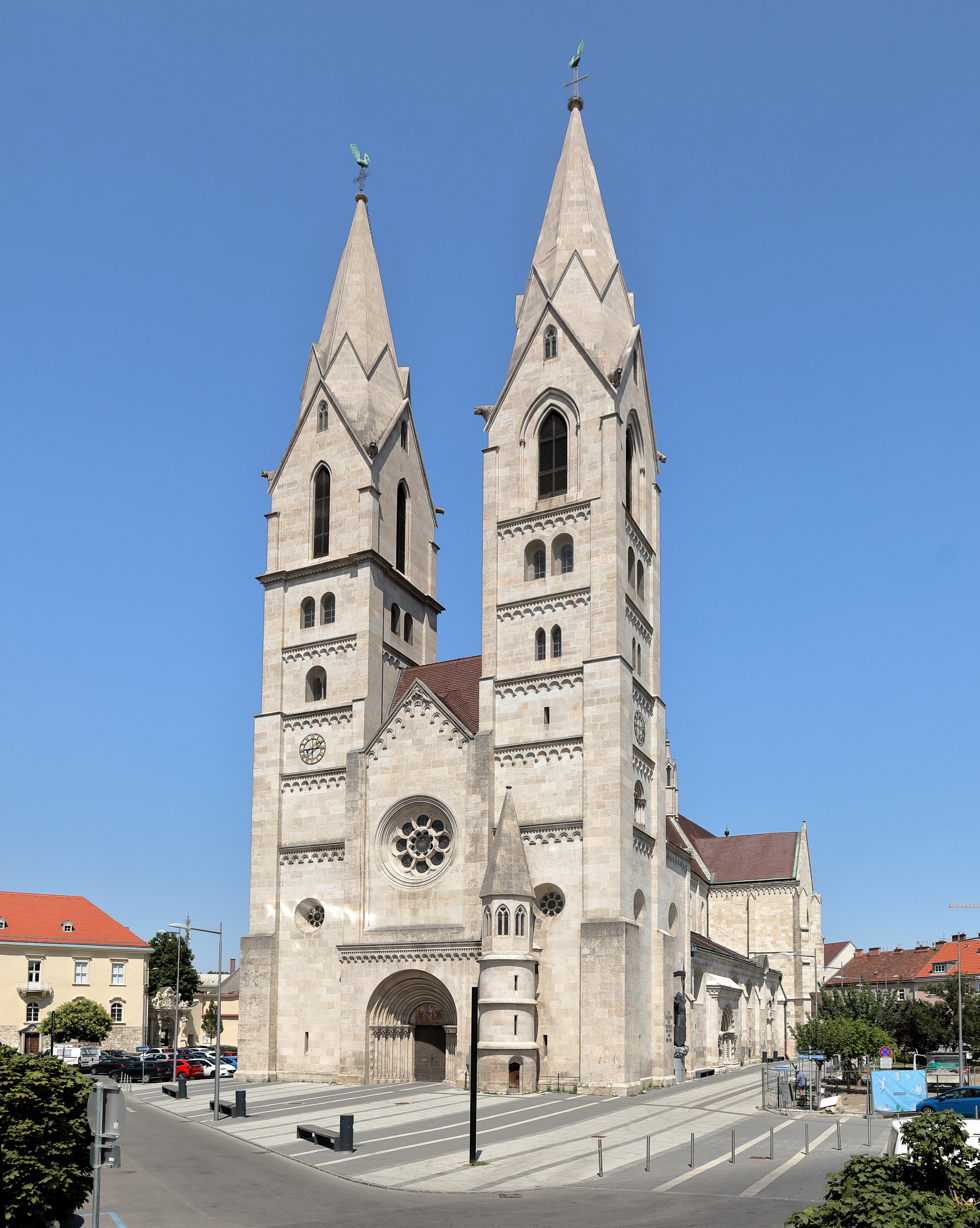
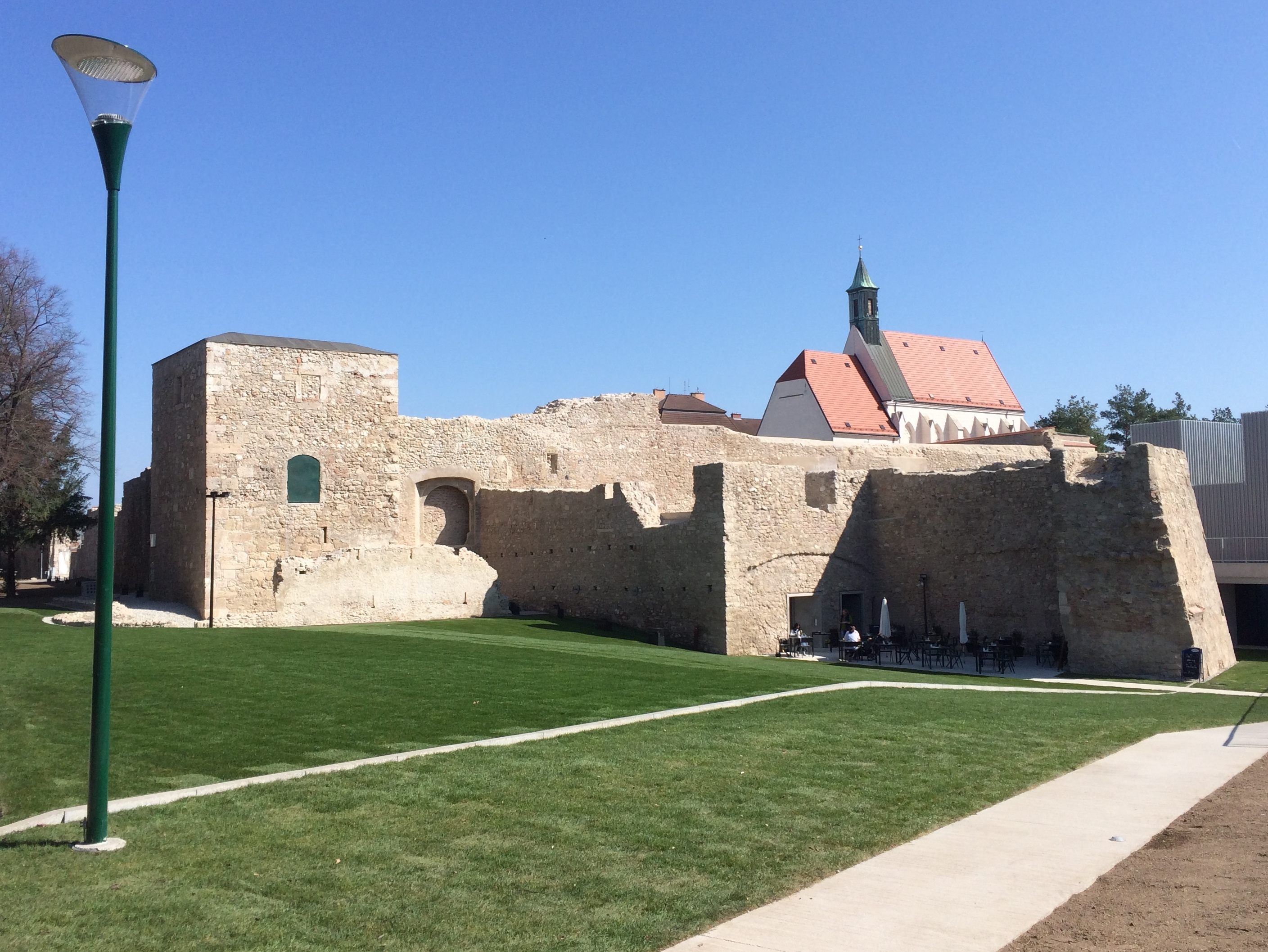
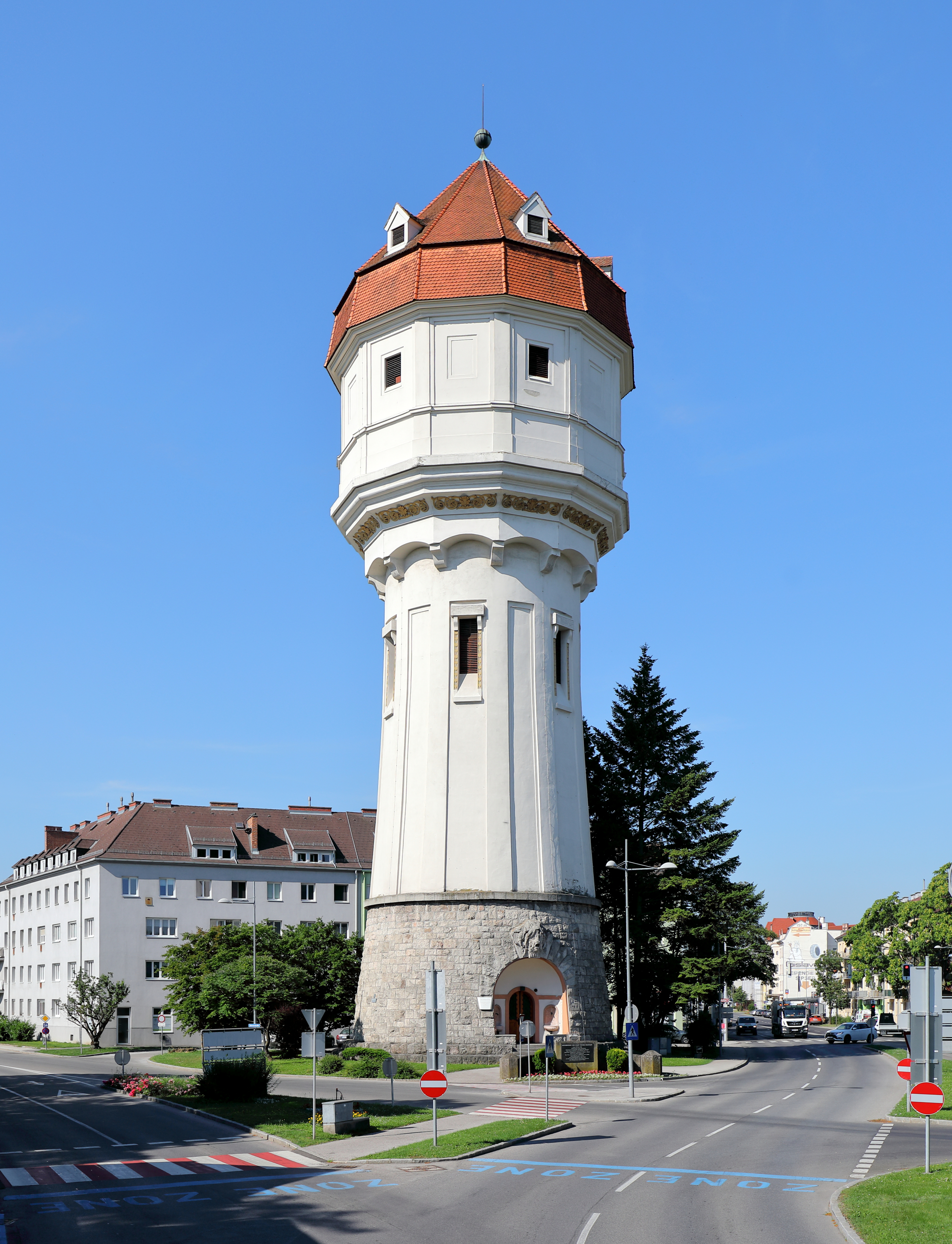
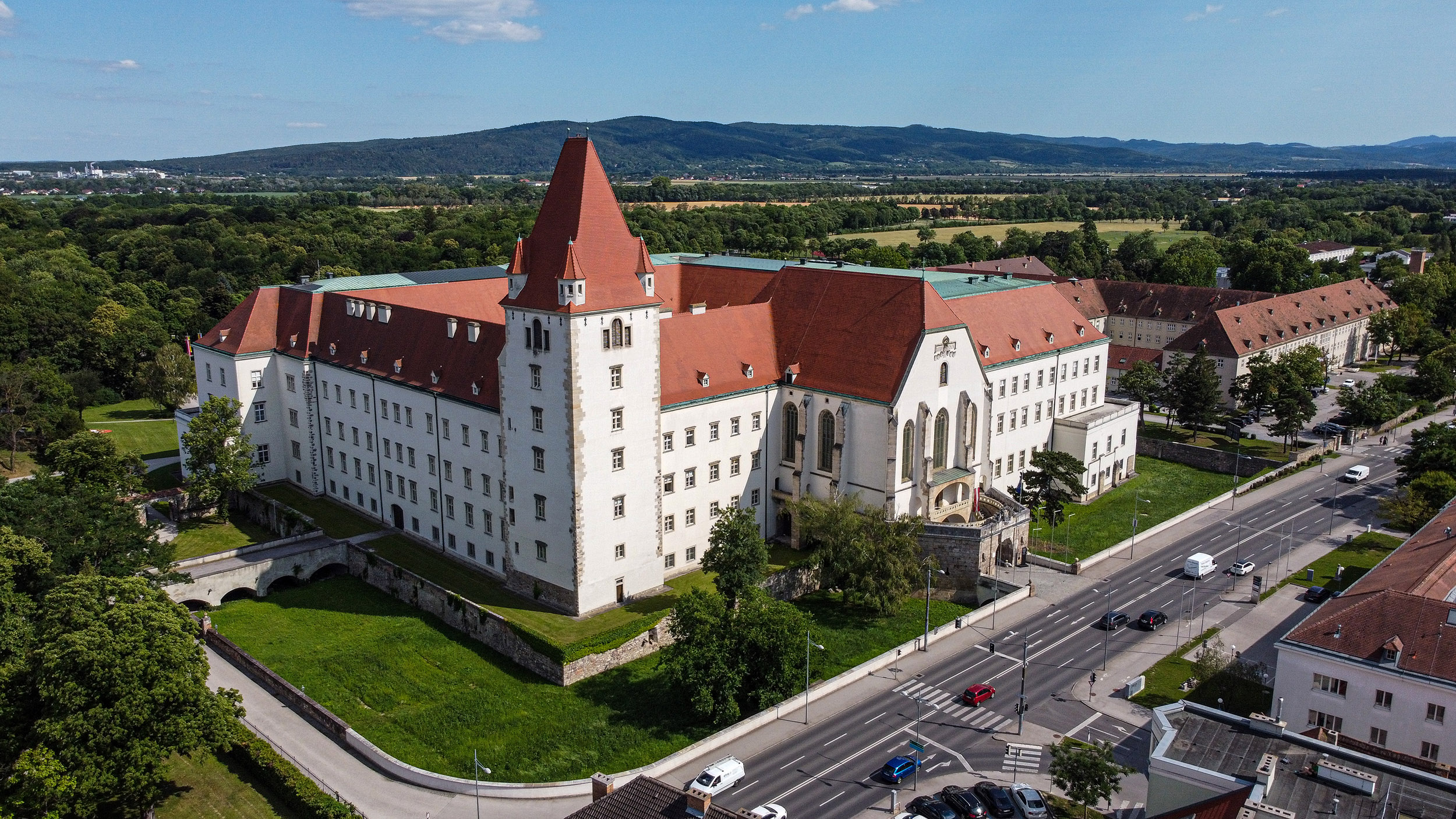
- From top down, left to right: Main Square, City walls and Reckturm, Cathedral, Casemate, Water Tower, Burg (Theresian Military Academy)

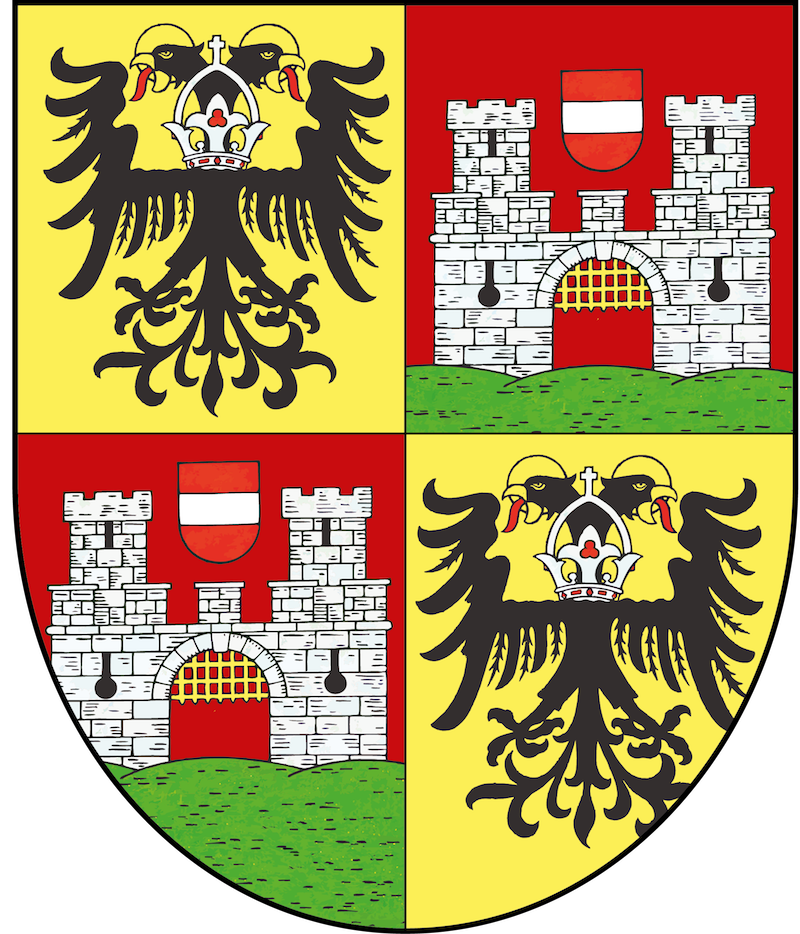
- Flag Coat of arms

- Location within Austria Wiener Neustadt (Austria)
- Coordinates: 47°48′32″N 16°13′57″E
- Country: Austria
- State: Lower Austria
- District: Statutory city

Government
  - Mayor: Klaus Schneeberger (ÖVP)

Area
  - Total: 60.94 km^{2} (23.53 sq mi)
- Elevation: 265 m (869 ft)

Population (2018-01-01)
  - Total: 44,820
  - Density: 735.5/km^{2} (1,905/sq mi)
- Time zone: UTC+1 (CET)
  - Summer (DST): UTC+2 (CEST)
- Postal code: 2700
- Area code: 02622
- Vehicle registration: WN
- Website: www.wiener-neustadt.at

Wiener Neustadt (German pronunciation: [ˈviːnɐ ˈnɔʏʃtat]; lit. 'Viennese New Town'; Central Bavarian: Weana Neistod, pronounced [ˈvɛɐ̯nɐ ˈnɔɪ̯ʃtɔt]) is a city in southern part of the Austrian state of Lower Austria. The city is located some 50 kilometres (31 mi) south of the centre of the capital Vienna. It is a self-governing city and the seat of the district administration of Wiener Neustadt-Land District.

Wiener Neustadt is home to one of the world's oldest military academies, the Theresian Military Academy, established by Empress Maria Theresa of Austria in 1751 to train officers for the Austrian army.

== History ==
The area once belonged to the County of Pitten, which had been inherited by Margrave Ottokar III of Styria in 1158. After the dynasty of the Otakars became extinct with the death of his son Ottokar IV, the Duchy of Styria passed to the Austrian House of Babenberg according to the Georgenberg Pact. Duke Leopold V of Austria established the town called Neustadt in 1194 and financed the construction of a fortress close to the Hungarian border with the ransom paid for the English king Richard the Lionheart, whom he had previously captured and held as a hostage at Dürnstein Castle. In 1241, a small Mongol squadron raided Neustadt during the Mongol incursions in the Holy Roman Empire but was later repulsed by Duke Friederich and his knights. In 1246, it was the scene of a victory of the Hungarians over the Austrians.

Neustadt gained important privileges that enabled the city to prosper. It remained a part of Styria, which after the 1278 Battle on the Marchfeld fell to the House of Habsburg and in 1379 became a constituent duchy of Inner Austria. In the 15th century, Wiener Neustadt experienced a population boom when Emperor Frederick III of Habsburg took up a residence here and established the Diocese of Wiener Neustadt in 1469. His wife, Eleanor of Portugal, died in Wiener Neustadt in 1467. The late Gothic church of the old Cistercian abbey contains a monument to her memory. The Wappenwand (coat-of-arms wall) at the local castle displays the coats of arms of his possessions in the middle. His son Maximilian I maintained his court in Wiener Neustadt and is buried here at St. George's Cathedral. The town then also had a significant Jewish commune with Rabbi Israel Isserlin as its most notable member, until all Jews were expelled by order of Emperor Maximilian I in 1496.

Habsburg's long-time rival King Matthias Corvinus of Hungary conquered the city in August 1487 after having laid siege to it for two years. According to legend, he dedicated the magnificent Corvinus Cup to the inhabitants after his victory. Maximilian I managed to reconquer his native city in 1490. During the 16th century, Wiener Neustadt lost its status as imperial residence and much of its importance. However, it still fulfilled its function as a bulwark against the Turks and the Kuruc.

It was at Neustadt that the emperor Rudolf II granted to the Bohemian Protestants, in 1609, the Majestätsbrief, or patent of equal rights. The revocation of this patent helped to precipitate the Thirty Years' War.

In 1751 the city received greater attention when Empress Maria Theresa of Austria decided to dedicate the First Military Academy, worldwide, inside the imperial castle. In 1752, the Theresian Military Academy took up its operations, which have continued to this day with only a few interruptions (Erwin Rommel was appointed commandant after the Austrian Anschluss in 1938). In 1768, Wiener Neustadt was destroyed by an earthquake that damaged the castle, which was rebuilt using plans made by the architect Nicolò Pacassi. In 1785, Emperor Joseph II transferred the see of the Wiener Neustadt diocese to Sankt Pölten.

In the 19th century the city, which was almost entirely rebuilt after a destructive fire in 1834, became an industrial town, especially after the opening of the Austrian Southern Railway in 1841. In 1909, the "first official Austrian airfield" was inaugurated north of the city. It served as a training ground for the flight pioneers Igo Etrich, Karl Illner and Adolf Warchalowski, who conducted their tests there.

The Austro-Hungarian strike of January 1918 was started in Wiener Neustadt by workers from the Austro-Daimler factory, which was engaged in arms production, and inspired by the Bolshevik seizure of power to take strike action to oppose the war. A key factor in the strike was the halving of the flour ration. Ferdinand Porsche met the workers and agreed to drive to Vienna to speak to the Minister of Food. However his plea to the workers to return to work was ignored and they marched on the Town Hall. Here they were joined by other workers from the locomotive factory, the radiator works, the aircraft factory and local ammunition plants of G. Rath and the Lichtenwörther. On 14 January over 10,000 workers gathered outside the town hall to complain about the halving of the flour ration. Inspired by the Russian Revolution the workers set up Workers Councils.

During World War II, strategic targets in Wiener Neustadt, including the marshalling yards, the Wiener Neustädter Flugzeugwerke (WNF) factory, and two Raxwerke plants which used forced laborers imprisoned at Mauthausen-Gusen concentration camp, were repeatedly bombed. Bombing operations such as Operation Pointblank left only 18 of 4,000 buildings undamaged.

Largest groups of foreign residents
Nationality	Population (2026)
Turkey	1,961
Romania	1,547
Hungary	1,273
Germany	722
Ukraine	674
Serbia	634
Syria	557
Bosnia and Herzegovina	478
Kosovo	470
Croatia	435
Slovakia	396
Bulgaria	301
Afghanistan	284
Poland	226
Russian Federation	182
Italy	136
North Macedonia	106
Iran	105
Czech Republic	97
Slovenia	62
Iraq	50

== Climate ==
The average monthly temperatures are generally cool (see table below), with summer months reaching 21–26 °C (70–79 °F) and winter months reaching a few degrees above freezing in the daytime.

Wiener Neustadt

Climate chart (precipitation, max. and min. temperature)
J	F	M	A	M	J	J	A	S	O	N	D
26 3 −4	25 6 −3	38 10 0	43 15 4	71 21 9	82 23 12	80 26 14	71 25 14	56 21 10	36 15 5	42 8 0	31 4 −3
- █ Average max. and min. temperatures in °C
- █ Precipitation totals in mm
- Source: ZAMG
Imperial conversion
J	F	M	A	M	J	J	A	S	O	N	D
1 37 25	1 43 27	1.5 50 32	1.7 59 39	2.8 70 48	3.2 73 54	3.1 79 57	2.8 77 57	2.2 70 50	1.4 59 41	1.7 46 32	1.2 39 27
- █ Average max. and min. temperatures in °F
- █ Precipitation totals in inches

Climate data for Wiener Neustadt (1971–2000)
Month	Jan	Feb	Mar	Apr	May	Jun	Jul	Aug	Sep	Oct	Nov	Dec	Year
Record high °C (°F)	19.0 (66.2)	19.6 (67.3)	25.3 (77.5)	27.0 (80.6)	30.7 (87.3)	34.5 (94.1)	36.9 (98.4)	37.4 (99.3)	33.5 (92.3)	25.6 (78.1)	20.9 (69.6)	19.7 (67.5)	37.4 (99.3)
Mean daily maximum °C (°F)	3.2 (37.8)	5.5 (41.9)	10.1 (50.2)	15.2 (59.4)	20.5 (68.9)	23.2 (73.8)	25.7 (78.3)	25.4 (77.7)	20.6 (69.1)	14.8 (58.6)	7.8 (46.0)	4.2 (39.6)	14.7 (58.5)
Daily mean °C (°F)	−0.8 (30.6)	0.7 (33.3)	4.6 (40.3)	9.2 (48.6)	14.5 (58.1)	17.6 (63.7)	19.7 (67.5)	19.1 (66.4)	14.6 (58.3)	9.1 (48.4)	3.5 (38.3)	0.5 (32.9)	9.4 (48.9)
Mean daily minimum °C (°F)	−4.2 (24.4)	−3.1 (26.4)	0.2 (32.4)	4.1 (39.4)	8.6 (47.5)	11.9 (53.4)	13.8 (56.8)	13.5 (56.3)	9.9 (49.8)	5.0 (41.0)	0.3 (32.5)	−2.6 (27.3)	4.8 (40.6)
Record low °C (°F)	−24.9 (−12.8)	−24.4 (−11.9)	−23.4 (−10.1)	−5.8 (21.6)	−1.4 (29.5)	0.8 (33.4)	4.2 (39.6)	4.4 (39.9)	0.3 (32.5)	−9.1 (15.6)	−17.8 (0.0)	−21.7 (−7.1)	−24.9 (−12.8)
Average precipitation mm (inches)	25.5 (1.00)	25.3 (1.00)	38.0 (1.50)	43.0 (1.69)	70.5 (2.78)	81.9 (3.22)	80.1 (3.15)	70.6 (2.78)	55.9 (2.20)	35.7 (1.41)	42.0 (1.65)	30.5 (1.20)	599.0 (23.58)
Average snowfall cm (inches)	15.0 (5.9)	11.5 (4.5)	10.1 (4.0)	1.6 (0.6)	0.0 (0.0)	0.0 (0.0)	0.0 (0.0)	0.0 (0.0)	0.0 (0.0)	0.1 (0.0)	6.9 (2.7)	11.5 (4.5)	56.7 (22.3)
Average precipitation days (≥ 1.0 mm)	5.6	5.4	7.2	7.7	9.4	10.5	8.8	8.6	7.4	5.7	6.9	6.7	89.9
Average relative humidity (%) (at 14:00)	70.8	63.9	55.7	50.4	52.3	53.0	49.6	50.3	55.1	60.1	69.8	72.9	58.7
Mean monthly sunshine hours	64.0	92.8	133.7	170.8	218.9	214.6	240.8	225.8	166.4	125.1	68.9	51.9	1,773.7
Percentage possible sunshine	26.1	35.8	40.0	45.7	51.5	50.8	56.5	56.2	49.2	41.7	27.8	22.3	42.0
Source: Central Institute for Meteorology and Geodynamics

== Main sights ==
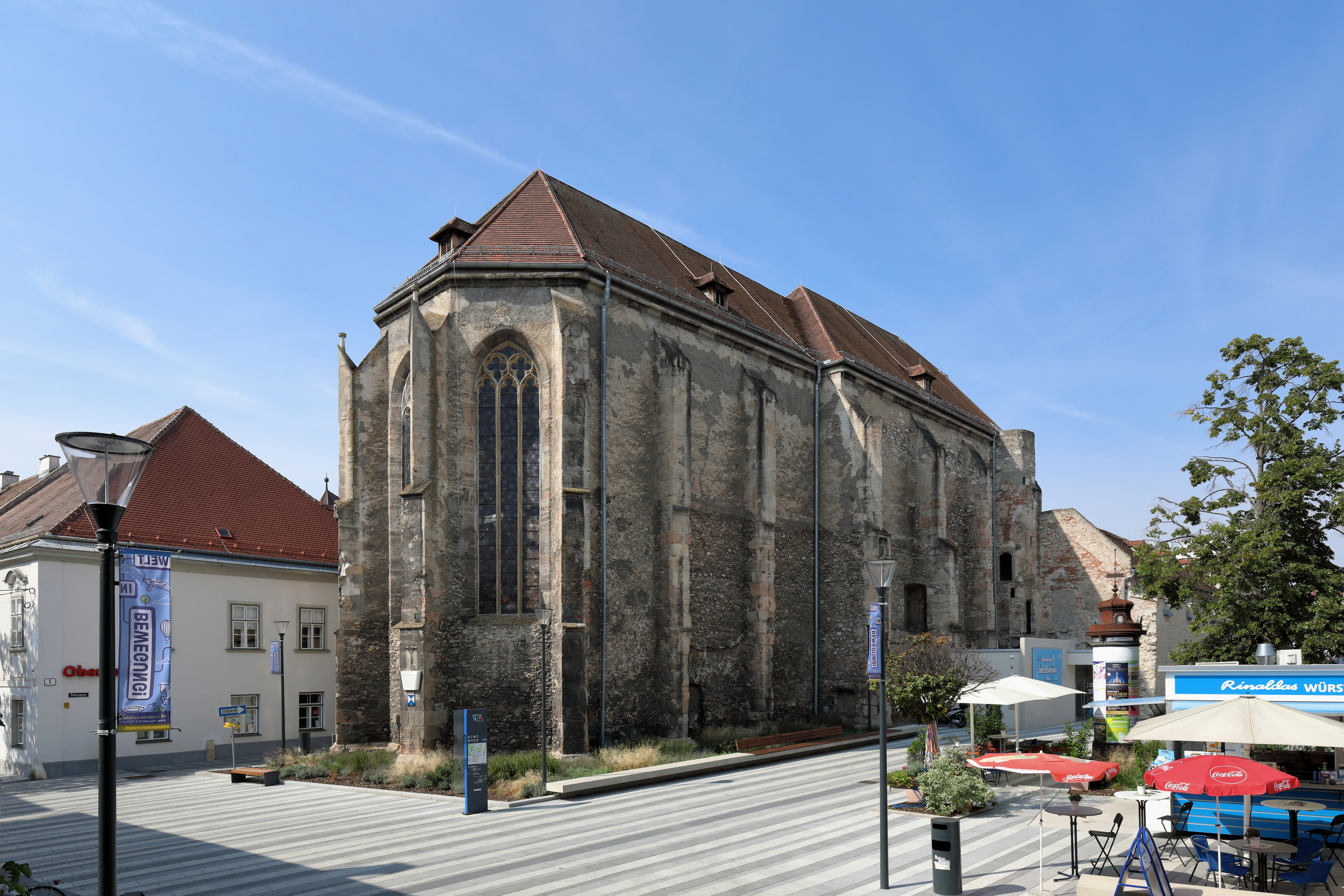
Church of St. Peter an der Sperr, now the City Museum

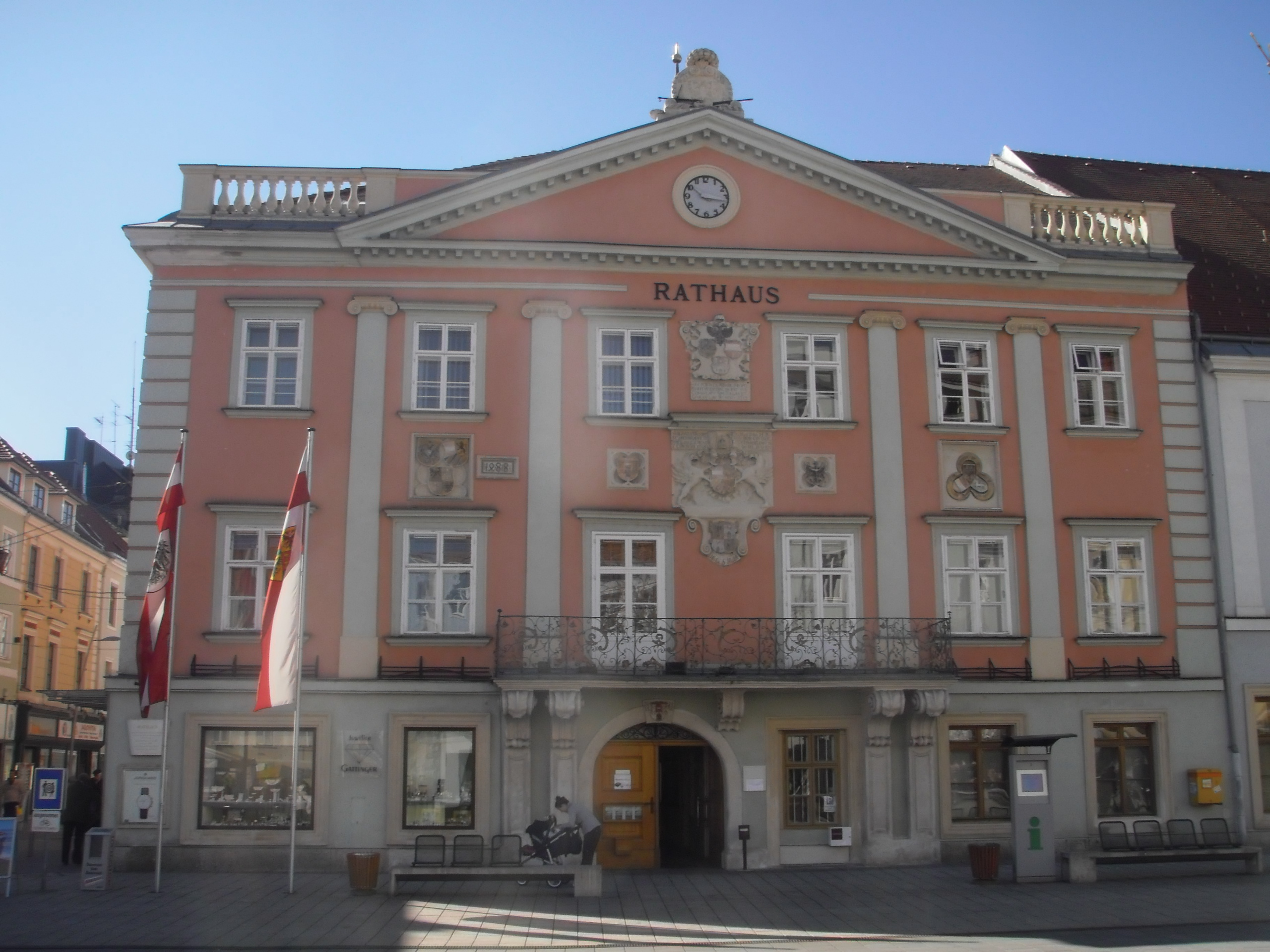
City Hall, seat of the city government since 1401

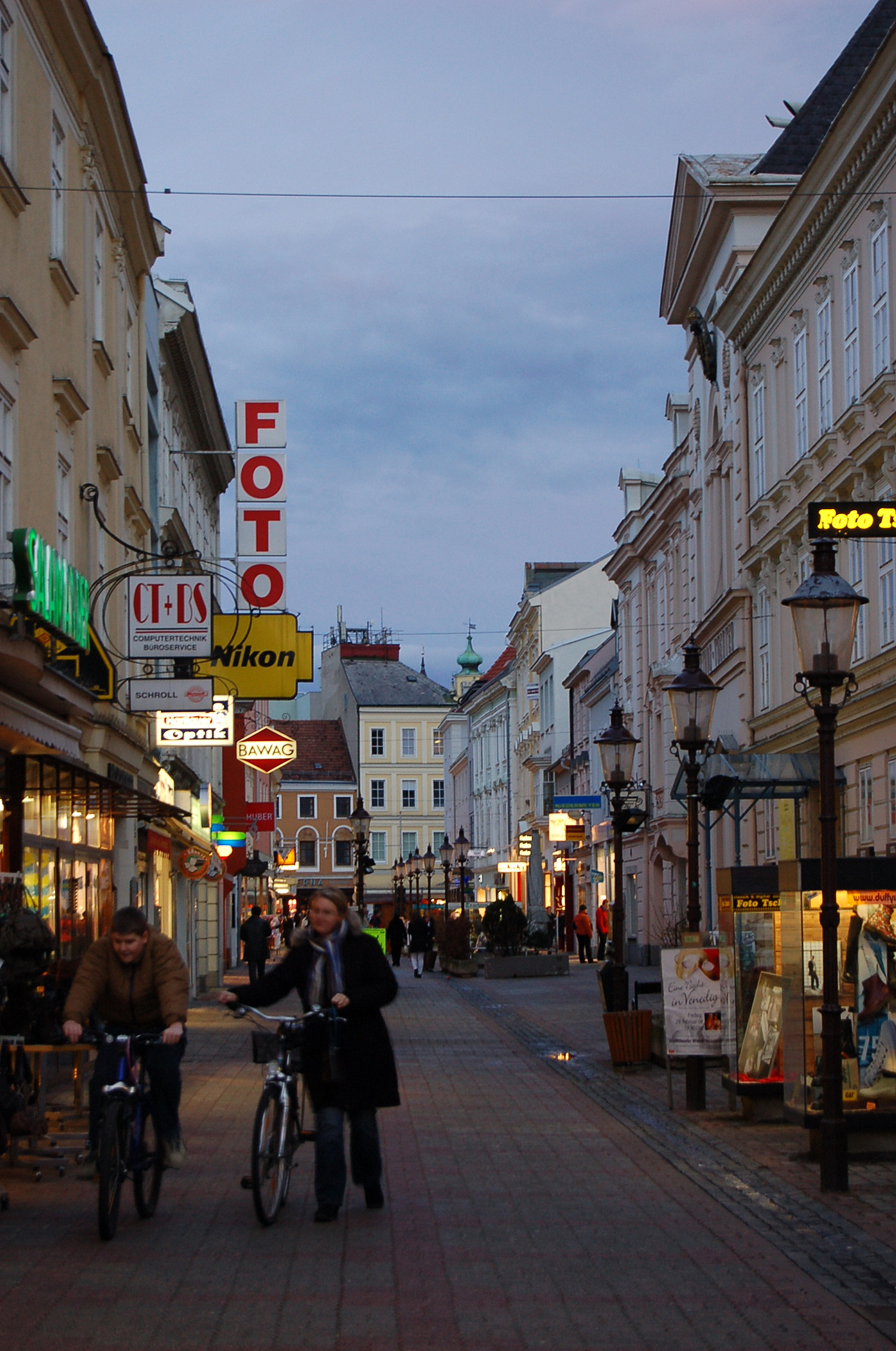
Herzog-Leopold Street near the Main Square

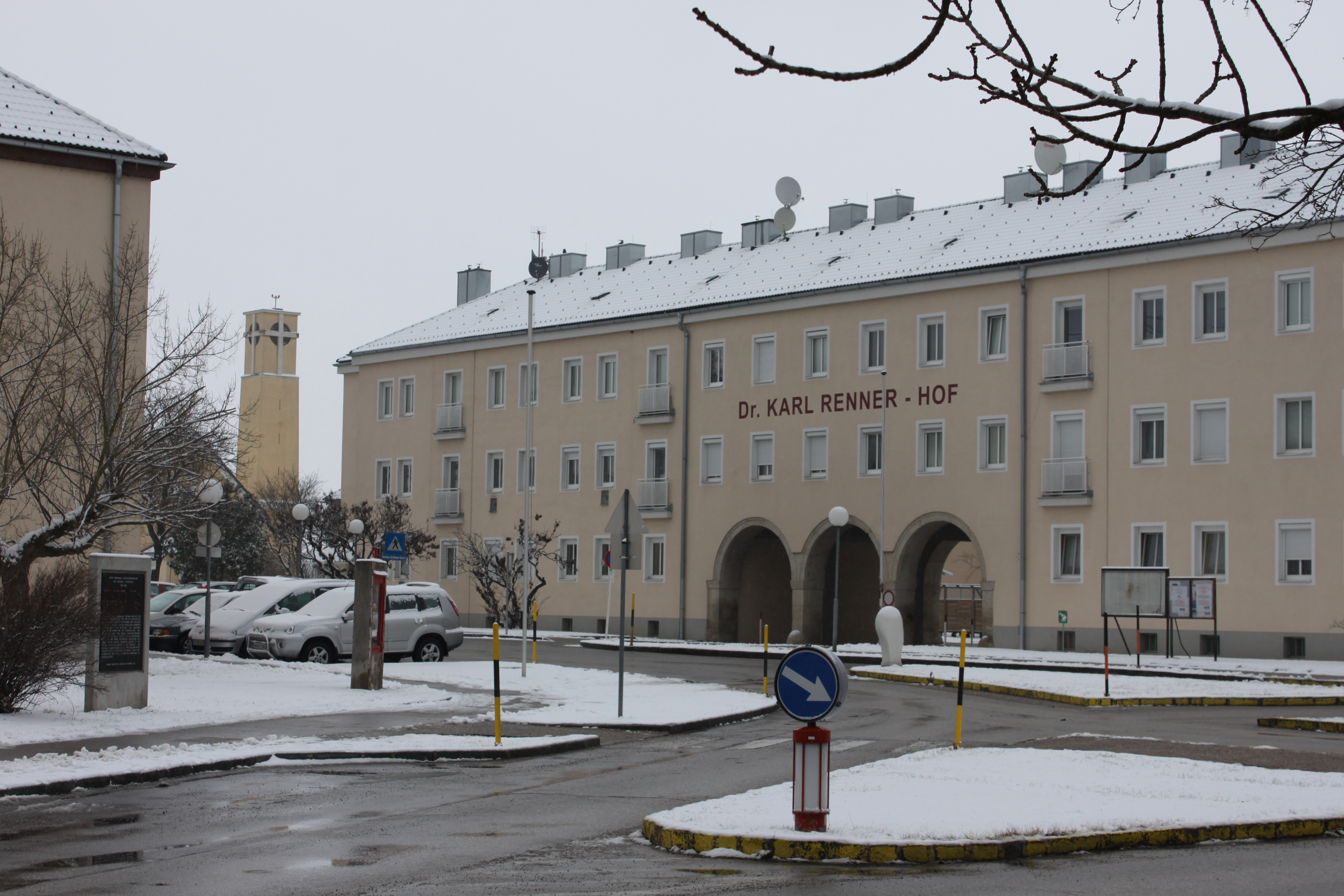
Dr.-Karl-Renner-Hof, first municipal residential complex in Austria

- The Late-Romanesque cathedral, the Dom, consecrated in 1279 and constructed from 1469 to 1785. The choir and transept, in Gothic style, are from the 14th century. In the late 15th century 12 statues of the Apostles were added in the apse, while the bust of Cardinal Melchior Klesl is attributed to Gian Lorenzo Bernini.
- Former church of St. Peter an der Sperr, erected in the 13th century and modified in the mid-15th century by the imperial architect Peter von Pusica. Secularized in the 19th century, it is now used for exhibitions.
- The Theresian Military Academy, a 13th-century formerly four-towered castle which was later used as residence by Frederick III of Habsburg. The latter had it enlarged and the St. George Chapel built in the mid-15th century: it has notable glassworks and houses the tomb of Emperor Maximilian I. It became seat of the Academy in 1752. Destroyed during World War II, it has been rebuilt to the original appearance.
- Water tower
- Tower of Tortures (Reckturm, early 13th century), now housing a private weapons collection.
- Mariensäule (a plague column at Hauptplatz)
- Church of the Capuchins, documented from the 13th century. Of the original construction today the Gothic choir (late 14th century) and the statues of St. Mary and St. James can be seen.
- The medieval walls, built using part of the ransom of Richard I of England.
- Communal Museum of Wiener Neustadt
- City archives
- Aviation museum Aviaticum
- Industrial museum
- Hospital museum
- Mineralogical museum
- The Casemate (Kasematten), a medieval fortification and expansion of the city walls, partially reconstructed and opened for visitors in preparation for the Lower Austrian exhibition 2019

== Transportation ==
Wiener Neustadt Hauptbahnhof (German: main station) lies on the Südbahn (German: southern railway) as well as several regional railways. It is owned and operated by the ÖBB and is the busiest railway station in Lower Austria. There are also two additional S-Bahn stations and one regional train station within the city. Wiener Neustadt lies on the A2 Süd Autobahn and the S4 Mattersburger Schnellstraße.

The city's bus network has 11 lines operating in the city and connecting it to neighboring villages.

The city has two airfields (the military Wiener Neustadt West Airport, the first airfield in Austria, and the civilian Wiener Neustadt East Airport). However, there no scheduled services operated at the airport. The nearest airport is Vienna Airport, located 66 km (41 mi) north east of Wiener Neustadt, it can easily be reached by train, bus and car.

The starting point of Austria's only shipping canal, the Wiener Neustadt Canal, which was meant to reach out to Trieste but was never finished.

== Politics ==
=== Municipal council ===
Elections in January 2025:

- VPWN (ÖVP) 15 seats
- SPÖ 11 seats
- FPÖ 8 seats
- The Greens – The Green Alternative 4 seats
- Gemeinsam für Neustadt (i.e. Together for Neustadt) 1 seat
- NEOS 1 seat

Total: 40 seats

=== Mayors ===
- 1467–1471: Johann Roll
- 1945–1965: Rudolf Wehrl
- 1965–1984: Hans Barwitzius
- 1984–1993: Gustav Kraupa
- 1993–1997: Peter Wittmann
- 1997–2005: Traude Dierdorf
- 2005–2015: Bernhard Müller
- since 2015: Klaus Schneeberger

== University, professional schools, vocational academies ==
Austria's first and largest Fachhochschule for business and engineering, the University of Applied Sciences Wiener Neustadt, is located here.

== City partnerships ==
- Monheim am Rhein, North Rhine-Westphalia, Germany
- Desenzano del Garda, Italy
- Harbin, People's Republic of China (PRC)

== Development of the city ==
The most recent extension of the city is the Civitas Nova, Latin for new city, an ambitious project for an industrial, research and commercial center. In 2015, on the area of the Civitas Nova, a cancer treatment center for ion therapy was opened under the name of MedAustron.

== Culture ==
In 1996 Wiener Neustadt received international attention as the so-called "sidewalk" designed by Japanese artist Tadashi Kawamata was built around the main square. Wiener Neustadt is the setting for the book Reluctant Return: A Survivor's Journey to an Austrian town. It was announced that Wiener Neustadt would host the European leg of Woodstock '99 over the weekend of July 16 to 18 1999. It was intended that up to 300,000 people would the festival, but the European leg of Woodstock '99 was ultimately canceled.

== Sport ==
=== Association football ===
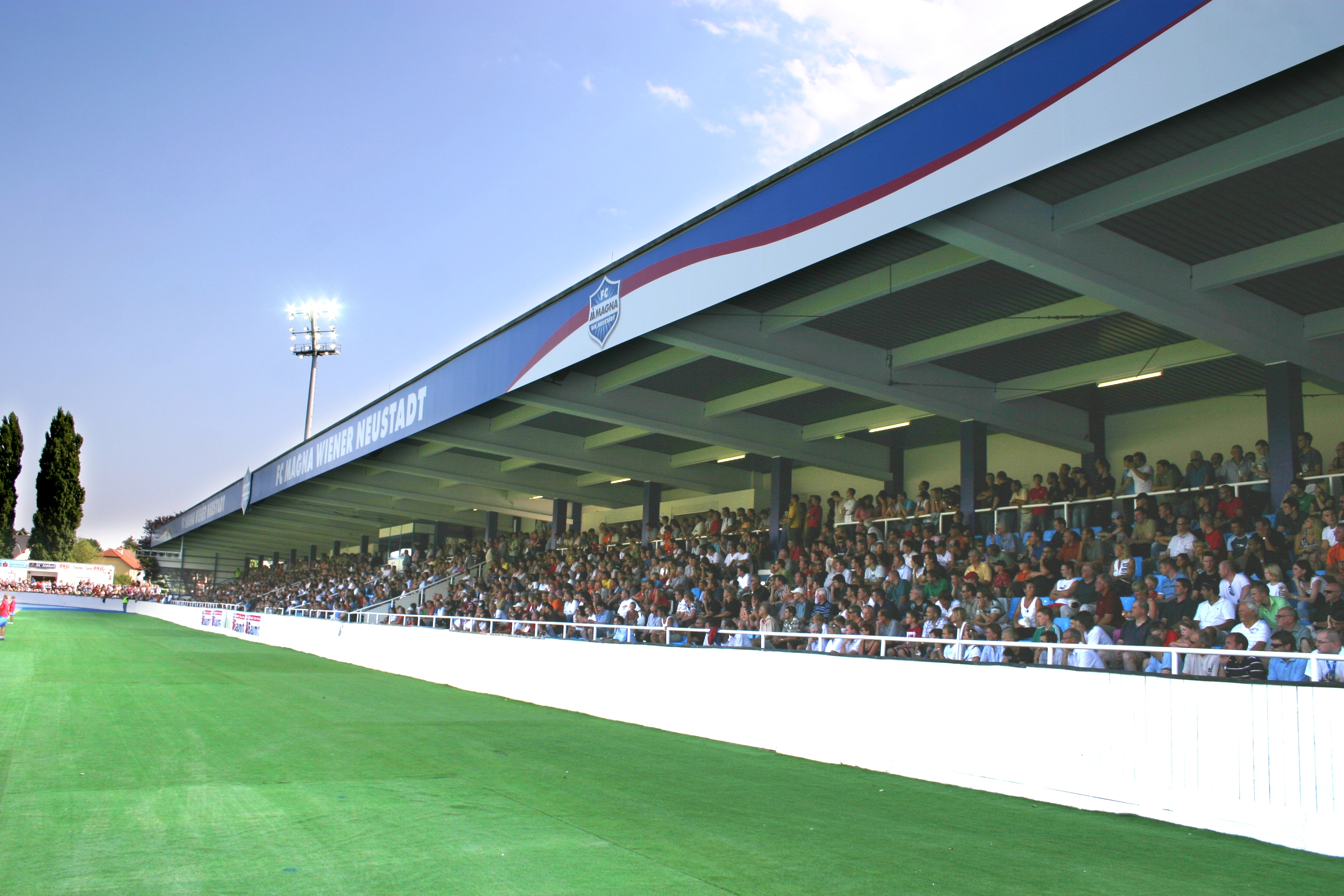
Wiener Neustadt Stadium.

1. Wiener Neustädter SC and then 1. Wiener Neustädter SC (2008) played in the Austrian Football First League at the Stadion Wiener Neustadt before the stadium was demolished and replaced by the Wiener Neustadt Arena, which opened in 2019.

=== Speedway ===
In 1995, the Stadion Wiener Neustadt hosted the world championship round called the 1995 Speedway Grand Prix of Austria. It also hosted rounds of the Speedway World Team Cup in 1978, 1986 to 1989 and 1993 and rounds of the Speedway World Pairs Championship in 1988, 1990 and 1993. When speedway ended at the Stadion Wiener Neustadt, a smaller speedway venue was used in nearby Eggendorf.

=== Baseball ===
The city is home to a baseball and softball team called the "Diving Ducks", which have had success both within the country and internationally. They provide teams for various age groups, starting from the youngest team to the softball team "Crazy Chicklets", the adult team "Rubber Ducks" as well as their professional team the "Diving Ducks".

=== Other sports ===
- The European horseback jumping championships of 2015 for children, juniors and young riders was set up at Lake Arena, outside of Wiener Neustadt.
- Wiener Neustadt played host to the sixth round of the 2018 Red Bull Air Race World Championship.
- The Arena Nova hosts sporting events such as handball.
- The Aqua Arena is a large swimming facility.

== Notable people ==
- Maximilian I, Holy Roman Emperor
- Israel Isserlein, (1390–1460), Slovenian and German rabbi
- Queen Mariana of Spain (1634–1696)
- Johanna Beisteiner, (born 1976), classical guitarist
- Elazar Benyoëtz
- Thérèse de Dillmont, writer on textiles
- Joseph Matthias Hauer, composer
- Karl Merkatz, actor
- Carl von In der Maur, Austrian statesman (1852–1913)
- Irfan Skiljan, computer programmer and creator of IrfanView now working in Wiener Neustadt
- Michael Haneke, (born 1942), film director
- Werner Schlager, professional table tennis player
- Dominic Thiem, tennis player
- Dennis Novak, tennis player

== Neighbouring municipalities ==
- Theresienfeld
- Neudörfl
- Lichtenwörth
- Katzelsdorf
- Weikersdorf am Steinfelde
- Bad Fischau-Brunn
