= Casablanca directive =

The Casablanca directive was approved by the Combined Chiefs of Staff (CCOS) of the Western Allies at their 65th meeting on 21 January 1943 and issued to the appropriate Royal Air Force and United States Army Air Forces commanders on 4 February 1943. It remained in force until 17 April 1944, when the Allied strategic bomber commands based in Britain were directed to help with preparations for Operation Overlord.

The CCOS met during the Casablanca Conference when the Allies were deciding the future strategy of the war.

The directive set out a series of priorities for the strategic bombing of Germany by the air forces based in the UK (RAF Bomber Command and US Eighth Air Force). With modification in June, making German fighters (part of their main defence against Allied bombers) an "intermediate target " and the primary goal, it gave direction to the combined (USAAF and RAF) bombing offensive known as Operation Pointblank.

== Contents ==
Memorandum C.C.S. 166/1/D by the Combined Chiefs of Staff, 21 January 1943:

The Bomber Offensive from the United Kingdom
Directive to the appropriate British and U.S. Air Force Commanders to govern the operation of the British and U.S. Bomber Commands in the United Kingdom (Approved by the Combined Chiefs of Staff at their 65th meeting on 21 January 1943)

1. Your Primary object will be the progressive destruction and dislocation of the German military, industrial, and economic system, and the undermining of the morale of the German people to a point where their capacity for armed resistance is fatally weakened.

2. Within that General concept, your primary objectives, subject to the exigencies of weather and tactical feasibility, will for the present be in the following order of priority:

(a) German submarine construction yards.
(b) The German aircraft industry.
(c) Transportation.
(d) Oil plants.
(e) Other targets in enemy war industry.

The above order of priority may be varied from time to time according to developments in the strategical situation. Moreover, other objectives of great importance either from the political or military point of view must be attacked. Examples of these are:

(1) Submarine operating bases on the Biscay coast. If these can be put out of action, a great step forward will have been taken in the U-boat war which the C.C.S have agreed to be a first charge on our resources. Day and night attacks on these bases have been inaugurated and should be continued so that an assessment of their effects can be made as soon as possible. If it is found that successful results can be achieved, these attacks should continue whenever conditions are favorable for as long and as often as is necessary. These objectives have not been included in the order of priority, which covers the long term operations, particularly as the bases are not situated in Germany.
(2) Berlin, which should be attacked when the conditions are suitable for the attainment of the specially valuable results unfavorable to the morale of the enemy or favorable to that of the Russians.

3. You may also be required, at the appropriate time, to attack objectives in Northern Italy on connection with amphibious operations in the Mediterranean theater.
4. There may be certain other objectives of great but fleeting importance for the attack of which all necessary planes and preparations should be made. Of these, an example would be the important units of the German Fleet in harbor or at sea.
5. You should take every opportunity to attack Germany by day, to destroy objectives that are unsuitable for night attack, to sustain continuous pressure on German morale, to impose heavy losses on the German day fighter force, and to contain German fighter strength away from the Russian and Mediterranean theaters of war.
6. When the Allied armies reenter the Continent, you will afford them all possible support in the manner most effective.
7. In attacking objectives in occupied territories, you will conform to such instructions as may be issued from time to time for political reasons by His Majesty's Government through the British Chiefs of Staff.

—Combined Chiefs of Staff.

C.C.S. 166/1/D was a revised and expanded version of the "C.C.S 166" document which had been presented for discussion to the Combined Chiefs of Staff on 20 January by the British Chiefs of Staff. The discussions brought up several issues, such as how to phrase the memorandum to balance the concerns of the different stake-holders about the priority to give to anti-U-boat activities as opposed to support for the planned operations to take place in the Mediterranean theatre. Two changes were proposed and agreed that the addition "for political reasons" should be inserted into "... issued from time to time [for political reasons] by His Majesty's Government ..." and that the word "synthetic" was removed "~~Synthetic~~ oil plants". Further changes were made to the British draft of the memorandum in the ordering of some of the sentences.

A modified version of the Casablanca directive as sent to RAF Bomber Command on 4 February 1943:

Date:
4 February 1943
Air Min Ref:
C.S. 16536 S.46368 A.C.A.S. Ops
Primary
Subject to exigencies of weather and of tactical feasibility (see object);—

(a) Submarine construction yards.
(b) German aircraft industry.
(c) Transportation.
(d) Oil plants.
(e) Other targets in enemy war industry.
This order of priority may be varied with the strategic situation and the U-boat bases in France.

On Demand
(i) U-boat bases on the Biscay coast.

(ii) When Allied Armies re-enter Continent, to afford all possible support in a manner most effective.
(III)Objectives in Northern Italy in connection with amphibious operations.

Periodic:
Berlin when conditions suitable for attainment of specially valuable results unfavourable to the enemy morale of favourable to Russian morale.
Object:
Primarily the progressive destruction and dislocation of the German military, industrial and economic systems and the undermining of the morale of the German people to a point where their capacity for armed resistance is fatally weakened. Every opportunity to be taken to attack Germany by day to destroy objectives that are unsuitable for night attack, to sustain continuous pressure on German morale, to impose heavy losses on German day fighter force and to conserve German fighter force away from the Russian and Mediterranean theatres of war.

—Air Ministry.

Arthur "Bomber" Harris, the commander of RAF Bomber Command from 1942, included the directive in his papers (published in 1995 as Despatch on War Operations: 23rd February, 1942, to 8th May, 1945) with an attached note to the bottom.

Note:	This directive known as the Casablanca directive or POINTBLANK, replaces the general directive No. 5 above, S46368 D.C.A.S, 14th February 1942 and was issued to the appropriate British and United States Air Force Commanders to govern the operations of British and U.S. Bomber Commands in the United Kingdom (Approved by Combined Chiefs of Staff at their 65th Meeting, 21st January, 1943)

—Harris.

The RAF Bomber command version contains most of the information that is in the C.C.S. memorandum but in a different order and in the note at the bottom it makes it clear that this directive replaced general directive No. 5, that is often referred to as the Area Bombing Directive. Missing from the Bomber command directive are mention of "point 4" in the C.C.S. version – objectives of great but fleeting importance such as the German Fleet – and point 7 which was redundant as RAF Bomber Command already obeyed orders originating from the Chiefs of Staff Committee (British Chiefs of Staff) whatever their military or political origins.

Despite the lack of an explicit mention of "point 4" in the Bomber Command version of the directive, Bomber Command was involved in attacking the German capital ships only a few days after this directive reached them, when along with the Royal Navy and its Fleet Air Arm they failed to prevent the successful "Channel Dash" made by the Scharnhorst, Gneisenau, Prinz Eugen, supported by a number of smaller ships, from France to their home ports.

In his post war book Bomber offensive Harris mentions the Casablanca directive at the start of chapter seven "The offensive underway". In it he emphasises the "Object" paragraph of the directive issued to the RAF and mentions the "Primary" paragraph in passing. He explains that the subject of morale had been dropped (it had been emphasised in the previous general directive No. 5 (the Area Bombing Directive)) and that he was to proceed with the "general 'disorganisation' of German industry" but that some parts of that industry, such as U-boat building, had a higher priority than others, from which he drew the conclusion that it "allowed [him] to attack any German industrial city of 100,000 inhabitants and above" and that the Ruhr remained the principal target for the RAF.
