= V-2 rocket facilities of World War II =

- Part of Nazi Germany
- European Theatre of World War II
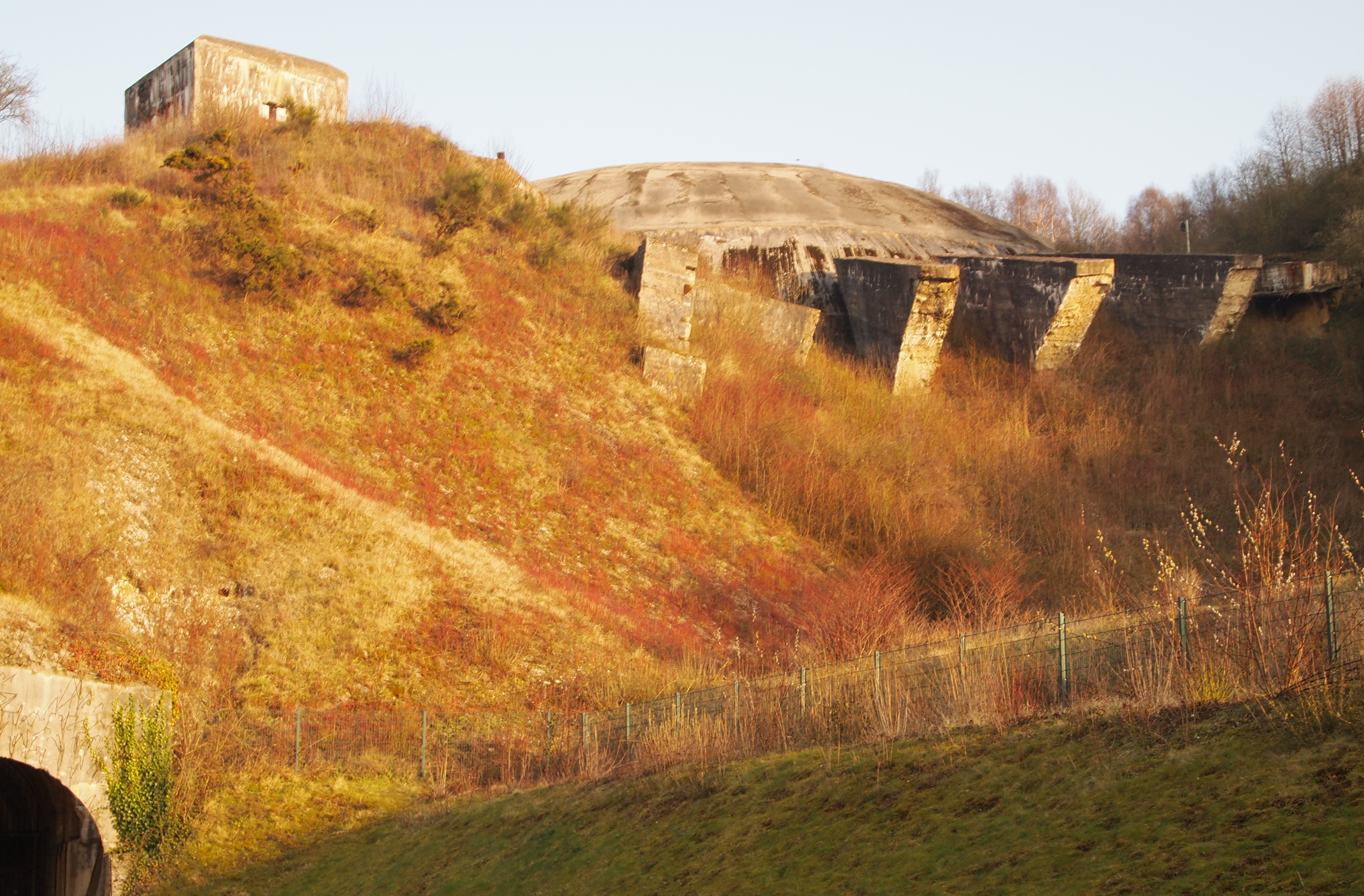
- La Coupole was a bunker for V-2 launches planned near Wizernes.

Site history
- Built by: Organisation Todt and others
- In use: -1945
- Battles/wars: Operation Crossbow

Nazi Germany's V-2 rocket facilities were military installations associated with Nazi Germany's V-2 SRBM ballistic missile, including bunkers and launch pads used to construct, store, and launch the V-2. Examples included La Coupole a bunker used to protect large stores of V-2's before launch, and Peenemünde Army Research Center, used for the main testing and development of the V-2.

Most major sites still remain in some capacity, though most are decrepit, with concrete structures being the only reliably surviving sections of the facilities. Additionally, most of the facilities surviving in good condition are either research or testing facilities, with production or launch facilities being heavily targeted by Allied bombing.

== Development, testing, and production facilities ==
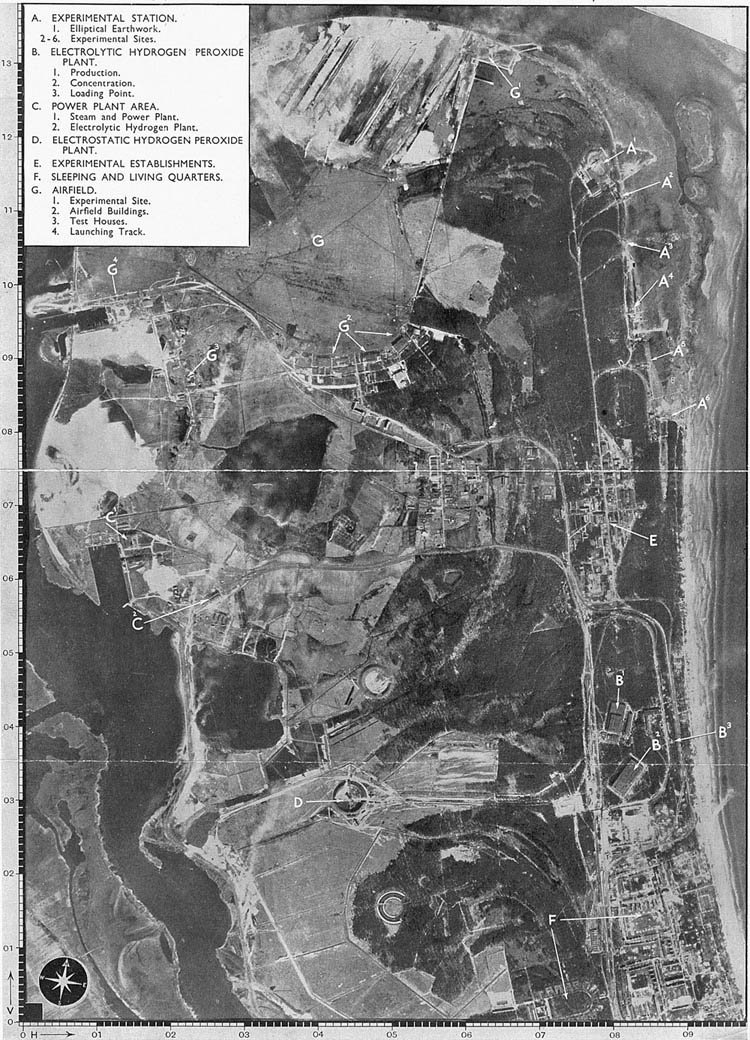
The Peenemünde Army Research Center was adjacent to the Luftwaffe's Peenemünde Airfield

V-2 research was conducted at the Peenemünde Army Research Center with most Peenemünde test launches conducted from Test Stand VII. After having moved the launch training facility named "Heimat-Artillerie-Park 11 Karlshagen/Pomerania" from Köslin near Peenemünde, the Training and Testing Battery 444 (German: Lehr- und Versuchsbatterie Nr 444) conducted "live warhead trials" from the Heidelager military area near Pustkow and Blizna, Poland, into the target area at the Pripet Marshes 200 miles (320 km) to the northeast. With the advances by the Russian armies, the Blizna testing site was evacuated on September 8, 1944, to the Heidekraut testing-ground in the Tuchola Forest in Polish Pomerania. In mid-January 1945, testing moved to the forests to the south of Wolgast, and then to the area of Rethun on the Weser river west of Hannover though no launches were conducted from either location. Plans for production facilities at Demag-Fahrzeugwerke in Berlin-Falkensee, Raxwerke, and the Zeppelin Works in Friedrichshafen were never completed. The initial production plant at Peenemünde and the plant's forced laborers were transferred to the Mittelwerk underground plant and nearby Dora camp of KZ Dachau to produce the operational V-2 rockets. Near the Mittelwerk was a servomotor production facility in a salt mine and a quality control facility at Ilfeld.

After the Operation Hydra bombing of the Peenemünde Army Research Center, the supersonic wind tunnel was moved to Kochel and engine testing and calibration was moved to Lehesten. Near the end of World War II in Europe, Peenemünde scientists were evacuated to the Alpine Fortress (German: Alpenfestung) A research and test facility planned since early 1944 in the Austrian Alps (under the codename Salamander) were never implemented; the target areas would have been in the Tatra Mountains, the Arlberg range, and the area of the Ortler mountain. V-2 rocket documents and drawings were hidden in a mine at Dörnten (14 tons from Peenemünde) and buried at Bad Sachsa (260 lbs from Walter Dornberger's headquarters at Schwedt-an-der-Oder).

== Launch and support facilities ==
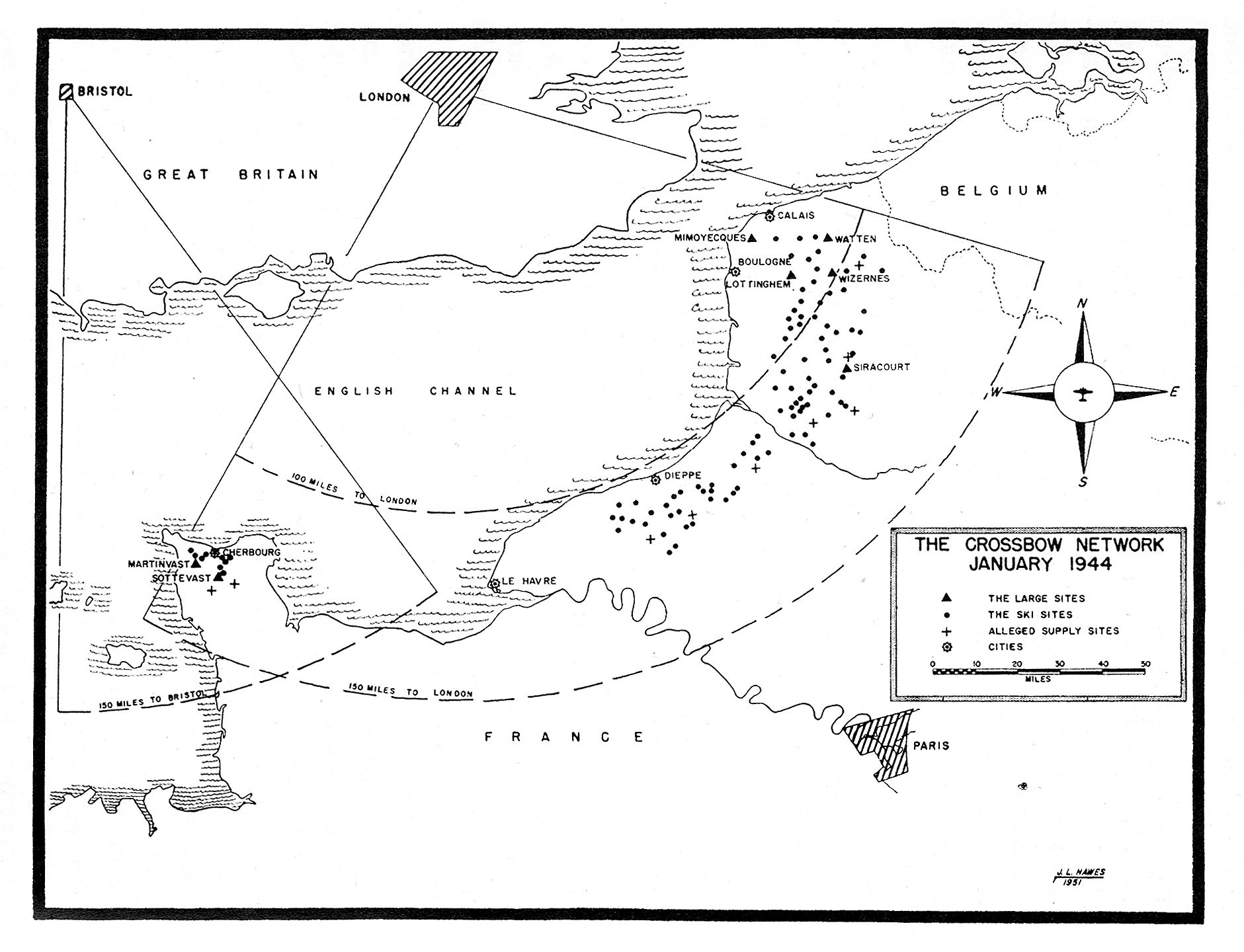
A World War II map shows the two areas where the Germans were setting up their secret "V" weapons to bombard England (right, center). These are the areas in which the Royal Air Force and 8th Air Force heavy bombers concentrated their bombs in order to knock out the weapons -- part of the pre-invasion plan. This event was given the operational code name Crossbow during World War II.

Initial plans for large launch bunkers at Watten and Wizernes with a radar station at Prédefin were abandoned due to the Allied bombing targeted against them. Additional plans for small launch bunkers such as at Thiennes on the edge of the Foret de la Nieppe, at Rauville, and at Colombières near Trévières; as well as for exposed concrete pads (39 north of the Somme and 6 in Western Normandy) were switched to use firings from mobile launch platforms instead. Mobile launching sites included the Haagse Bos and the Duindigt Racecourse at The Hague.

Eight main storage dumps were planned and four had been completed by July 1944. These were all captured before being used. The storage depot at Mery-sur-Oise was bombed on August 2, 1944. Work had been started in August 1943 and completed by February 1944; and the depots (including those at Bergueneuse and Villiers-Adam) included "service buildings for testing V2 sub-assemblies in the vertical position". Testing of production motors at the Southern Works was originally conducted in late 1943 at Oberraderach near Friedrichshafen, but was shut down shortly after going into operation because firings were visible from Switzerland across Lake Constance. Raxwerke motor testing equipment was eventually moved to the Redl-Zipf facility in central Austria, which used forced labor of the Schlier-Redl-Zipf subcamp of the Mauthausen-Gusen concentration camp.

Liquid oxygen supply had been identified as the bottleneck that would limit the number of rockets that could be launched as early as August 1941 by military planners. As the rocket campaign started in early September 1944 liquid oxygen was produced at five sites: underground installations at the Redl-Zipf (5 machines generating ca. 300 tons/month) and Lehesten (9 machines) rocket engine test facilities, an old mine in Wittring/Sarreguemines (5 machines), an old steel plant in Liège Tilleur (5 machines) and the Oberraderach test site (4 machines). The factories were operated using KZ slave labor. Original plans had also included liquid oxygen production in the Watten and Wizernes bunker complexes but machines were taken out and construction work ceased in July 1944 after repeated Allied bombings. From October 1944 liquid oxygen for operations was also sourced from the two production sites in Peenemünde (4 machines). Liège was liberated by the Allies on 8 September, the Wittring site in early December 1944. The oxygen machines were taken out to be installed at the Lehesten site and at the Mittelwerk underground factory. At the end of the V-2 campaign in early March 1945 liquid oxygen was supplied from Oberraderach, Lehesten, Redl-Zipf and opportunistically in small quantities from local producers as the transport infrastructure collapsed..

Plants at La Louviere, Torte, and Willebroeck also were targets of allied bombing.

== V-2 suppliers ==
The materials and parts for the V-2 were drawn from several suppliers.

- Berlin-Lichtenberg plant of Siemens Planiawerke (blanks for exhaust steering vanes)
- Meitingen plant of Siemens Planiawerke, near Augsburg (vane graphitizing & machining).
- Voss Works at Sarstedt (nose cone)
- Linke-Hoffman-Busch-Werke AG in Breslau (combustion chambers)
- Weimar near the Buchenwald camp (electrical parts)
- WUMAG Abt. Maschineenbau (Heinkel factory) in Jenbach (turbopump and steam generator)
- Marienthal railway tunnel at Rebstock (electrical wiring and harnesses, Meillerwagen)
- Petsamo, Finland (nickel in the 9% nickel steel for the low temp LOX tanks and pipes)

== See also ==
- V-1 flying bomb facilities
- Bombing of Mimoyecques during World War II
