= Raxwerke =

Coordinates: 47°49′47″N 16°15′11″E

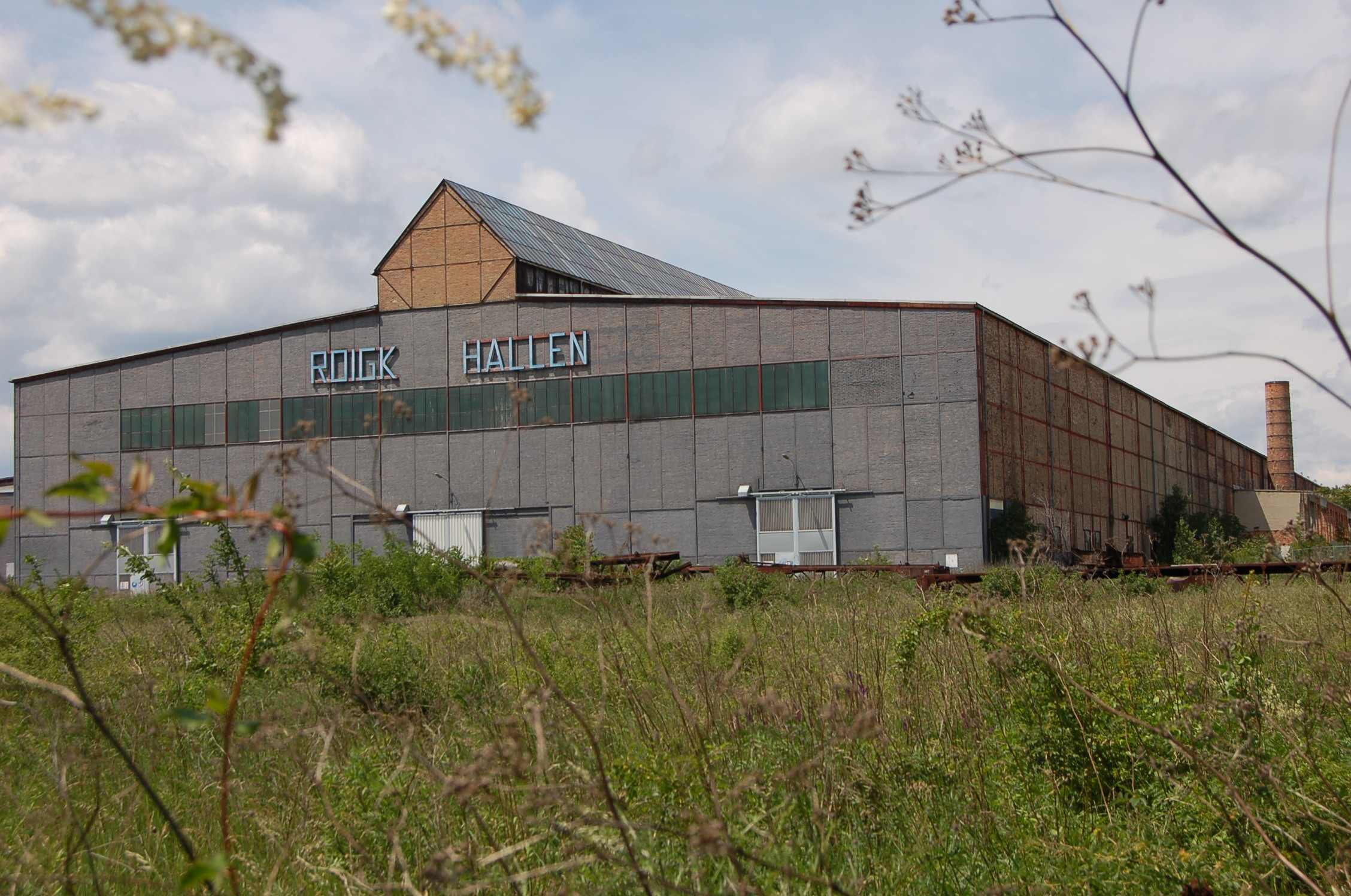
"Serbenhalle" (i.e. Serbian hall)

Raxwerke or Rax-Werke was a facility of the Wiener Neustädter Lokomotivfabrik at Wiener Neustadt in Lower Austria. During World War II, the company also produced lamps for Panzer tanks and anti-aircraft guns. Two Raxwerke plants employed several thousand forced laborers from the Mauthausen-Gusen concentration camp (on 20 June 1943 Mauthausen delivered ~500 prisoners to the Rax-Werke).

== Operations ==
Part of the Eastern Works (V-2 facilities in the Vienna-Friedrichshafen area), the 30 meter-high Serbs hall at the Raxwerke was selected for V-2 manufacturing.

A few V-2 center sections had been assembled by the Raxwerke when, on 2 November 1943, the US Fifteenth Air Force targeted the nearby Wiener Neustädter Flugzeugwerke (WNF) plant in Operation Crossbow and hit the Raxwerke. Rax test equipment was subsequently moved to the site of the Redl-Zipf brewery in central Austria (code name Schlier) where V-2 test stands were built.

Werner Dahm was sent from Peenemünde Army Research Center in Germany to the Raxwerke for the construction of an engine test stand for the Wasserfall anti-aircraft missile (construction was never completed).

== See also ==
- V-2 rocket facilities of World War II
