= Pointblank directive =

Allied bombing campaign against German aircraft production during World War 2

Operation Pointblank
- Part of Strategic bombing campaign in Europe
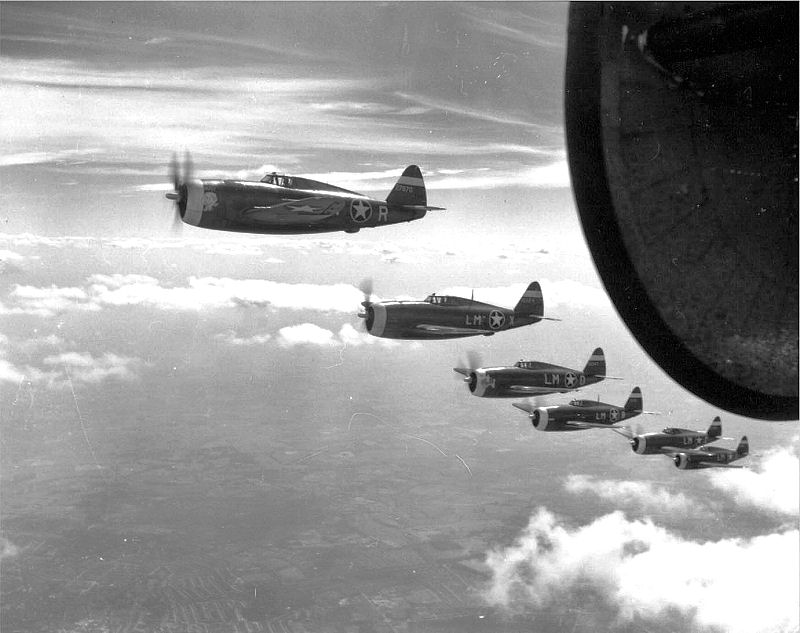
- USAAF P-47 Thunderbolt fighters, assigned to protect 8th Air Force bomber formations and to hunt for German fighters.
Date	14 June 1943 – 19 April 1944
Location	Germany, France
Result	Allied victory

Belligerents
United Kingdom; United States	Germany

Commanders and leaders
(United Kingdom) Arthur Harris (United States) Carl Spaatz	Unknown

The Pointblank directive authorised the initiation of Operation Pointblank, the code name for the part of the Allied Combined Bomber Offensive intended to cripple or destroy the German aircraft fighter strength, thus drawing it away from frontline operations and ensuring it would not be an obstacle to the invasion of Northwest Europe. The Pointblank directive of 14 June 1943 ordered RAF Bomber Command and the U.S. Eighth Air Force to bomb specific targets such as aircraft factories, and the order was confirmed when Allied leaders met at the Quebec Conference in August 1943. Up to that point, the RAF and USAAF had mostly been attacking the German industry in their own way – the British by broad night attacks on industrial areas, and the US in "precision attacks" by day on specific targets. The operational execution of the Directive was left to the commanders of the forces. As such, even after the directive, the British continued their night attacks. The majority of the attacks on German fighter production and combat with the fighters were conducted by the USAAF.

In practice, the USAAF bombers made large-scale daylight attacks on factories involved in fighter aircraft production. The Luftwaffe was forced into defending against these raids, and its fighters were drawn into battle with the bombers and their escorts. It was these battles of attrition that reduced the Luftwaffe's fighter pilot strength, despite increases in German aircraft production.

== Casablanca directive ==
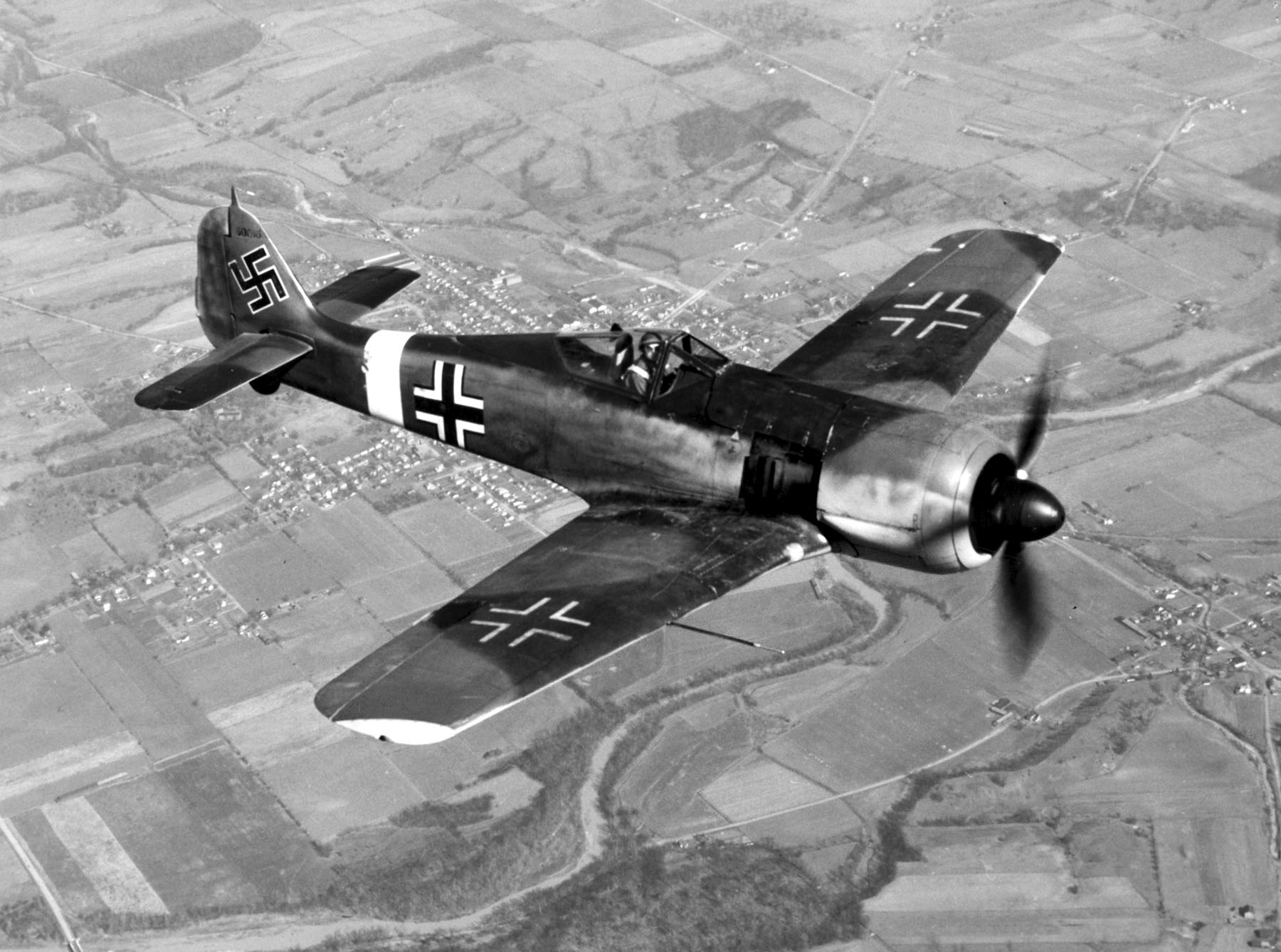
Luftwaffe Fw 190, one of the German single-engine fighters targeted by Pointblank.

At the January 1943 Casablanca Conference, the Combined Chiefs of Staff agreed to conduct the Combined Bomber Offensive (CBO), and the British Air Ministry issued the Casablanca directive on 4 February with the object of:

The progressive destruction and dislocation of the German military, industrial and economic systems and the undermining of the morale of the German people to a point where their capacity for armed resistance is fatally weakened. Every opportunity to be taken to attack Germany by day to destroy objectives that are unsuitable for night attack, to sustain continuous pressure on German morale, to impose heavy losses on German day fighter force and to contain German fighter strength away from the Russian and Mediterranean theatres of war.

On 14 June 1943, the Combined Chiefs of Staff issued the Pointblank directive which modified the February 1943 Casablanca directive. Along with the single-engine fighters of the CBO plan, the highest-priority Pointblank targets were the fighter aircraft factories since the Western Allied invasion of France could not take place without fighter superiority. In August 1943, the First Quebec Conference upheld this change of priorities.

Among the factories listed were the Regensburg Messerschmitt factory (Note: which would be attacked in the Schweinfurt–Regensburg mission attacked at high cost in August.), the Schweinfurter Kugellagerwerke ball-bearing factory (Note: attacked in the Second Raid on Schweinfurt in October and also causing heavy USAAF losses.) and the Wiener Neustädter Flugzeugwerke (WNF) which produced Bf 109 fighters.

== Fighter Command declines to engage ==
As part of the Pointblank plans, the USAAF repeatedly pressed the RAF to contribute to the daytime effort by providing fighter escorts, and even suggesting daylight bombing if sufficient escorts were available.

Long-range fighter operations are at a natural disadvantage; friendly ground assets like spotters and radar are not available and even radio support can be difficult. The penetrating aircraft have to carry much more fuel, reducing their performance, and the long flight times fatigue the pilots. This led RAF Fighter Command to conclude that their assets should be used purely defensively, and in the years leading up to Pointblank this had never seriously been reconsidered. Although escorts had been requested on several occasions by both Bomber Command and Coastal Command, Fighter Command repeatedly returned dubious reports stating the Supermarine Spitfire simply could not be converted. This was especially curious considering the D-model photoreconnaissance versions of the Spitfire were available from 1940 and offered the required range and performance.

For Pointblank, USAAF General Henry H. Arnold requested that allocations of the North American P-51 Mustang to the RAF be directed to provide escort for daytime raids and that British Mustangs be put under Eighth Air Force command. Chief of the Air Staff Charles Portal, responded that he could provide four squadrons, not nearly enough for the mission. Arnold wrote back, clearly upset, stating:

As presently employed it would appear that your thousands of fighters are not making use of their full capabilities. Our transition from the defensive to the offensive should surely carry with it the application of your large fighter force offensively ... We have put long range tanks in our P.47's. Those P.47's are doing some offensive action several hundred miles from England. In their basic design, our P.47's were shorter range aircraft than your Spitfires.

Arnold's letter said that he felt the fighters should have been fitted with additional fuel tanks and bombs and used against the German aircraft on the ground at their airfields. Portal responded saying that the day-force strength averaged 1,464 fighters and that it had "consistently been employed offensively... mainly in conjunction with medium and light bombers". His subordinate, Air Chief Marshal Trafford Leigh-Mallory, added that the RAF fighter force was designed for air superiority over Northern France in the coming invasion

USAAF General Barney M. Giles met with Portal and offered to convert two Spitfires entirely at the USAAF's expense. Two Mark IXs were shipped to Wright Field in January 1944 and modified, demonstrating their newfound range by flying back to England across the Atlantic. Tests at Boscombe Down were equally successful, but by the time the conversions had been approved in August, Pointblank had concluded and the Luftwaffe had been comprehensively weakened by years of attrition.
