= Transport Plan =

Wartime bombing campaign

Transportation Plan
- Part of Strategic bombing campaigns in Europe
Date	6 March 1944 - Late August 1944
Location	European Theatre of World War II
Result	Allied victory

Belligerents
United States; United Kingdom	Nazi Germany

Commanders and leaders
USAAF: Carl Spaatz RAF Bomber Command: Arthur Harris	

The Transportation Plan was a plan for strategic bombing during World War II against bridges, rail centres, including marshalling yards and repair shops in France with the goal of limiting the German military response to the invasion of France in June 1944.

The plan was based on those of Air Marshal Tedder and the "Overlord air plan" of Air Chief Marshal Leigh-Mallory, The plan was devised by Professor Solly Zuckerman, an advisor to the Air Ministry, to destroy transportation in Occupied France during the "preparatory period" for Operation Overlord so Germany would be unable to respond effectively to the invasion.

The air campaign, carried out by the bombers of the RAF and USAAF crippled the German rail networks in France and played a crucial role in disrupting German logistics and reinforcements to the invasion area.

== Plan and operations ==
Air Officer Commanding (AOC) RAF Bomber Command Marshal Arthur Harris did not want to divert his bomber force away from their strategic campaign against German industry (known to the Germans as the Defence of the Reich campaign). However, he resigned himself early on to supporting Overlord as early as 17 February 1944 while his force was engaged in the bombing campaign against Berlin. On 6 March 1944, Charles Portal ordered attacks on the marshalling yards at Trappes, Aulnoye, Le Mans, Amiens, Lougeau, Courtrai and Laon. Control of all air operations was transferred to Eisenhower on 14 April at noon.

== Attacks made under the Transport Plan ==
Bombing missions
Date	Target	Notes
Night of 7/8 March	Le Mans railway yards	304 RAF bombers attacked Le Mans.
Night of 13/14 March	Le Mans	Repeat attack on Le Mans by 222 RAF bombers.
Night of 15/16 March	Amiens	140 RAF aircraft
Night 23/24 March	Laon railway yards	143 RAF aircraft but attack stopped half-way through. The bombing had little effect.
25/26 March	Aulnoyne railway yards	192 RAF aircraft
18 April	Juvisy, France	Attack by the RAF with 200 bombers on the railway marshalling yards in Juvisy, France. Attack described as "appeared to be completely successful".
18 April	Noisy-le-Sec, France	Attack by the RAF of the Noisy-le-sec railway yards, France. In addition to the damage to the yards, "750 houses were destroyed and more than 2,000 damaged. 464 French people were killed and 370 injured" Over the following days, delayed action bombs exploded
18 April	Tergnier	171 aircraft used, Bomber command described outcome: "50 railway lines were blocked but most of the bombing fell on housing areas south-west of the railway yards."
22 April	Hamm, Germany	800 bombers attacked railway marshalling yards in Hamm, Germany.
May 1944	France	Attacks on railway yards in Chambery and across southern France killed more than 2,500 people.
		10/11 May: railway yards at Courtrai, Dieppe, Ghent, Lens and Lille 11/12 May Boulogne, Trouville nr Rennes, Louvain, Hasselt
9/10 June	Étampes, France	Bombing of the railway marshalling yards in Étampes, France. "The marking was accurate but late and the bombing spread from the railway junction into the town."

== Results ==
The effectiveness of the Transport Plan was evident in German reports at the time. A German Air Ministry (RLM) report of 13 June 1944 stated: "The raids...have caused the breakdown of all main lines; the coast defences have been cut off from the supply bases in the interior...producing a situation which threatens to have serious consequences" and that although "transportation of essential supplies for the civilian population have been completely...large scale strategic movement of German troops by rail is practically impossible at the present time and must remain so while attacks are maintained at their present intensity".
