= Lehesten =

- Town
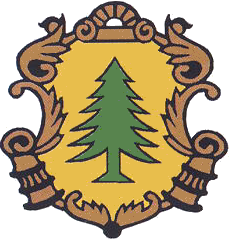
- Coat of arms

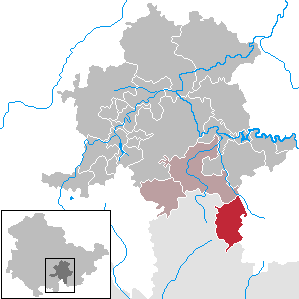
- Location of Lehesten within Saalfeld-Rudolstadt district
- Interactive map of Lehesten
- Location within Germany Location within Thuringia
- Coordinates: 50°28′32″N 11°26′53″E
- Country: Germany
- State: Thuringia
- District: Saalfeld-Rudolstadt
- Municipal assoc.: Schiefergebirge
- Subdivisions: 3

Government
  - Mayor (2021–27): Nicole Vockeroth

Area
  - Total: 35.94 km^{2} (13.88 sq mi)
- Elevation: 640 m (2,100 ft)

Population (2025-12-31)
  - Total: 1,495
  - Density: 41.60/km^{2} (107.7/sq mi)
- Time zone: UTC+01:00 (CET)
  - Summer (DST): UTC+02:00 (CEST)
- Postal codes: 07349
- Dialling codes: 036653
- Vehicle registration: SLF
- Website: www.lehesten.de

Lehesten (German pronunciation: [ˈleːəstn̩]) is a town in the Thuringian Forest, 20 km southeast of Saalfeld.

== World War II V-2 facility ==
Following the August 1943 decision to move production of the V-2 rocket underground, the German military signed a lease for the Oertelsbruch slate quarry in Lehesten on 15 September 1943. Dr. Martin Schilling, the head of testing at Peenemünde, had selected the site, and 400 engineers were moved there from Peenemünde. Concentration camp labor, held in an on-site camp ("Laura"), constructed the underground factory and helped to operate it. Liquid oxygen production and combustion chamber calibration began in January 1944. Nine oxygen machines were installed and operating by March 1944. In January 1945 an additional three machines were relocated there. The site was evacuated on 13 April 1945 prior to the arrival of Allied troops.
