= Battle of the Ruhr =

British bombing campaign during World War II

- Part of Strategic bombing during World War II
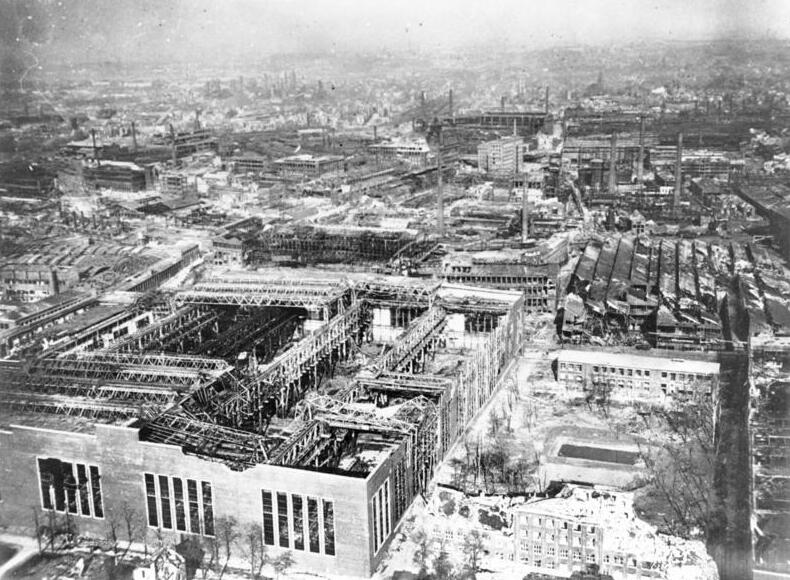
- The Krupp factory at Essen, 1945
Date	5 March – 31 July 1943
Location	Ruhr
Result	British victory

Belligerents
United Kingdom; Australia; Canada; New Zealand; South Africa; United States	Germany

Commanders and leaders
Charles Portal; Arthur Harris	Hermann Göring; Josef Kammhuber

Strength
Bomber Command; March: 380 heavy, 160 medium bombers; July: 800 bombers	Radar; anti-aircraft guns; day and night fighters

Casualties and losses
c. 5,000 aircrew; 675 aircraft lost; 2,126 aircraft damaged; USAAF: 16 B-17s; Bomber Command; 4.7 per cent (43 attacks, 18,506 sorties)	21,000 killed

The Battle of the Ruhr (5 March – 31 July 1943) was a strategic bombing campaign against the Ruhr Area in Nazi Germany carried out by RAF Bomber Command during the Second World War. The Ruhr was the main centre of German heavy industry with coke plants, steelworks, armaments factories and ten synthetic oil plants. The British attacked 26 targets identified in the Combined Bomber Offensive. Targets included the Krupp armament works (Essen), the Nordstern synthetic oil plant at Gelsenkirchen and the Rheinmetall–Borsig plant in Düsseldorf, which was evacuated during the battle. The battle included cities such as Cologne not in the Ruhr proper but which were in the larger Rhine-Ruhr region and considered part of the Ruhr industrial complex. Some targets were not sites of heavy industry but part of the production and movement of materiel.

The Ruhr had been attacked by Bomber Command from 1940; its defences and the amounts of industrial pollutants produced a semi-permanent smog that hampered bomb aiming. Along with anti-aircraft guns, searchlights and night fighters, the Germans built large decoys such as the Krupp decoy site (Kruppsche Nachtscheinanlage) near Essen to spoof the bombers into hitting open country. Cities outside the Ruhr were attacked to prevent the Germans from concentrating their defences and before the end of the battle, Operation Gomorrah on 24 July 1943, began the Battle of Hamburg. After the turn to Hamburg, Bomber Command continued to raid the Ruhr to keep the German defences dispersed.

== Background ==
=== Bomber Command, 1942 ===
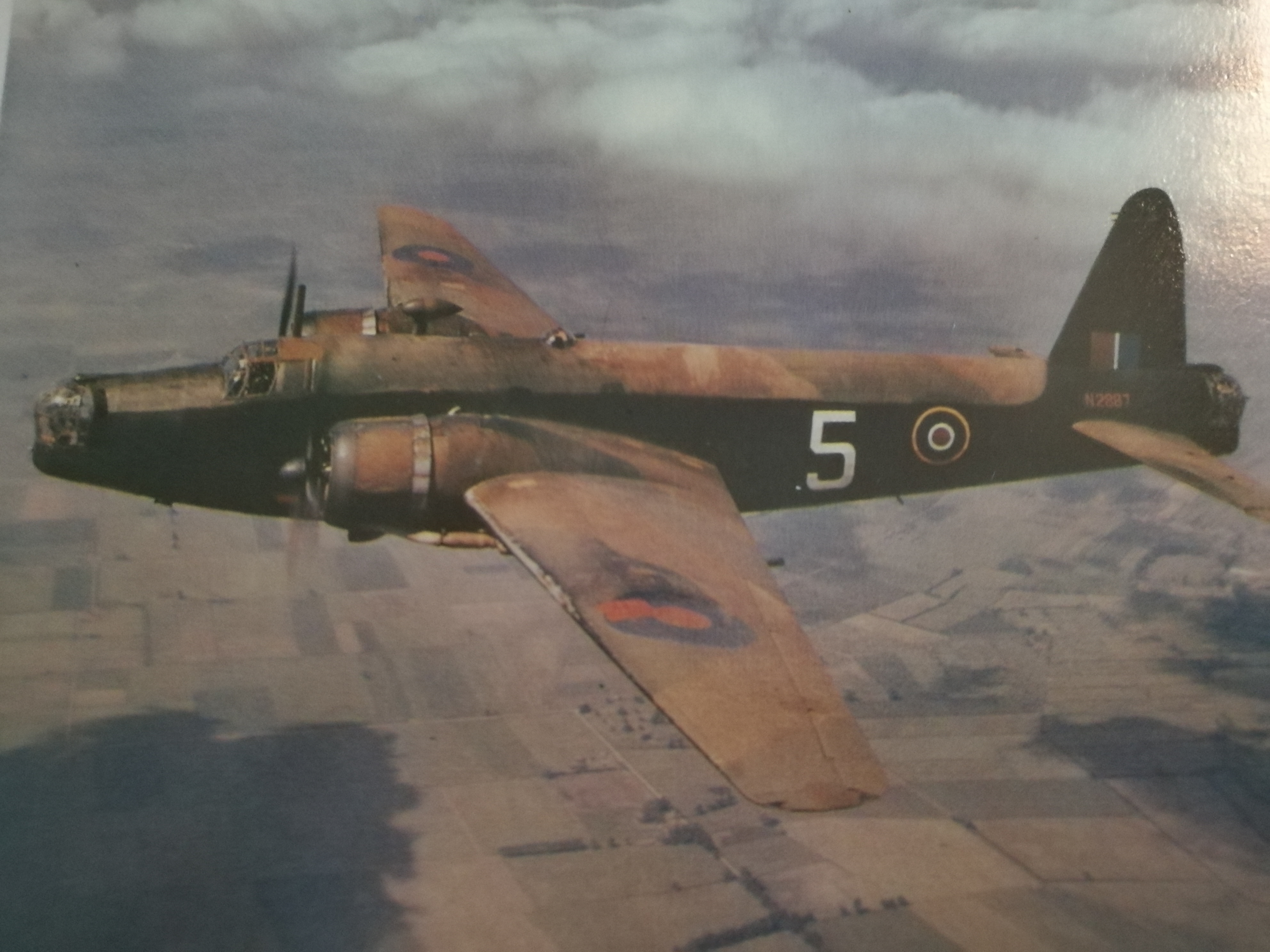
Vickers Wellington bomber, superseded in Bomber Command by newer four-engined heavy bombers during 1943

In 1942 some answers to the chronic problems of night navigation and target finding began to emerge but the number of bombers had stagnated. In November 1941 Bomber Command had a daily average of 506 bombers available and in January 1943 the average was 515. To carry out the Thousand-bomber raids Bomber Command drew on crews and aircraft from the Operational Training Units, which could only be exceptional. Navigation had been helped by the introduction of Gee but this device lacked accuracy for bombing through the dark and smog of the Ruhr, lacked range and from 4 August 1942 the Germans began to jam the device.

The Pathfinder Force (PFF) was established on 15 August 1942 but with Gee jammed and no target indicator bombs to mark the aiming point for the rest of the bombers (the Main Force), the task of the PFF varied from thankless to impossible. Despite its problems, Bomber Command had been able to achieve some spectacular results but these had been isolated events and due to favourable circumstances as well as judgement. The loss of 1,404 aircraft and 2,724 damaged to German night defences of increasing quantity and quality, especially German night fighters (Nachtjäger) had become a serious threat to the viability of the command and of strategic bombing as a theory of war.

In 1942 Bomber Command had created 19 new squadrons but 13 had been transferred to other commands. The quantity of aircraft had barely increased but a big improvement in quality had been achieved. Bristol Blenheim light bombers and Armstrong Whitworth Whitley medium bombers had been retired from the command in mid-1942, followed by the Handley Page Hampden medium bomber in September. The disappointments of the Short Stirling and the early Handley Page Halifax variants and the fiasco of the Avro Manchester, withdrawn in June 1942, was balanced by the Avro Lancaster, which made its operational début in March and demonstrated its superiority over all other bombers. (Note: The Lancaster was a redesigned Manchester with a greater wingspan and four of the excellent and tested Rolls-Royce Merlin XX engines, instead of two more powerful but unreliable Rolls-Royce Vulture engines.) Re-equipment with new types of aircraft led to an average of 16.36 per cent of Bomber Command squadrons withdrawn from operations for conversion onto new aircraft in 1942, against 3.3 per cent in 1943. On 1 January 1942 the command had 48 squadrons, 9 with heavy bombers, 34 with medium and five with light bombers (Blenheims). On 1 January 1943, there were 49 squadrons, 32 heavy, 11 medium and six light (de Havilland Mosquito). The command had flown 30,508 operational sorties in 1941 and dropped 31,646 long tons (32,154 t) of bombs, in 1942 it dropped 45,501 long tons (46,231 t) from 29,929 sorties.

==== Gee ====
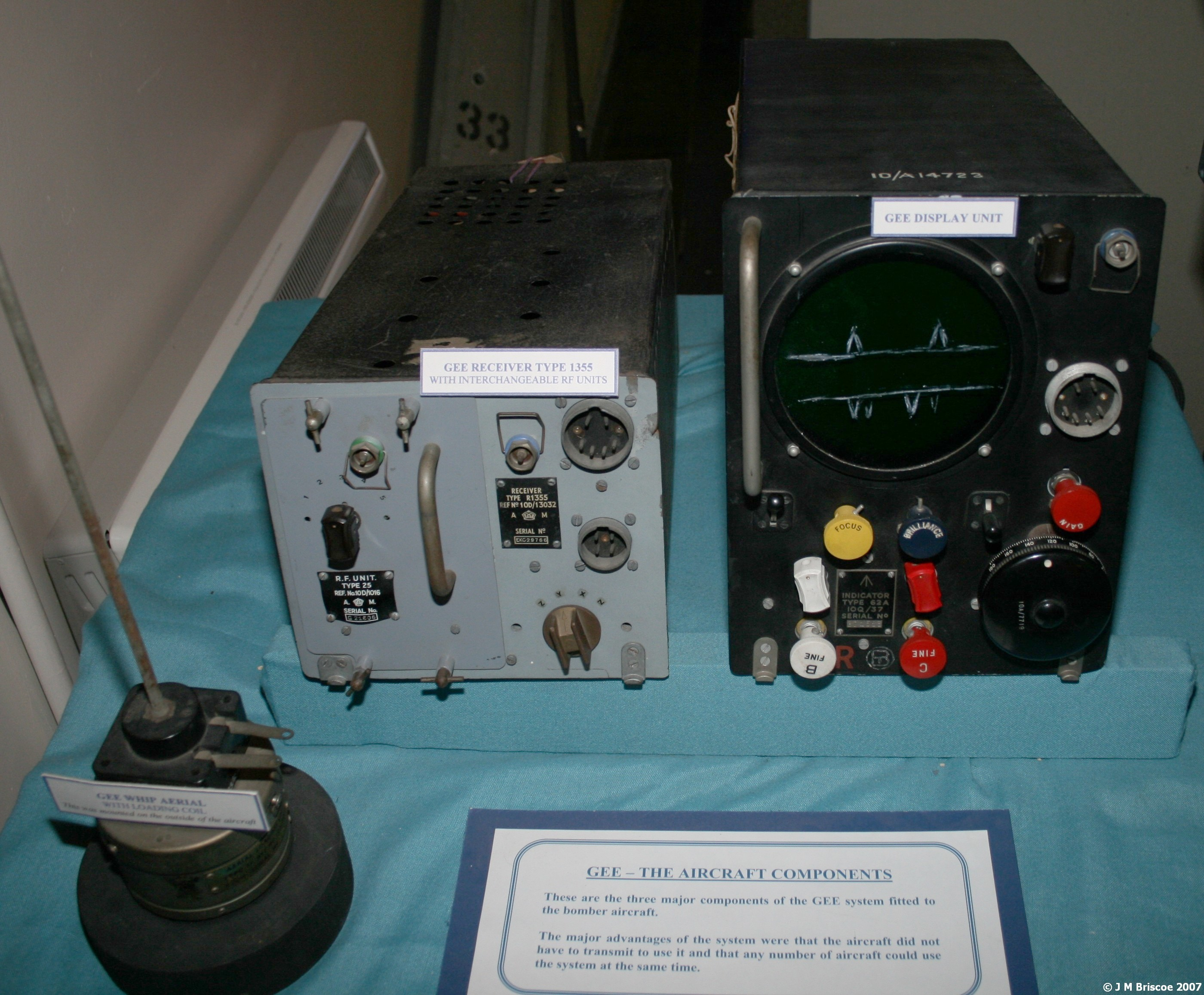
GEE airborne equipment, with the R1355 receiver on the left and the Indicator Unit Type 62A on the right

Gee worked by wireless signals transmitted from three ground stations in England, on a line about 200 mi (320 km) long, being displayed on a cathode ray tube to the navigator and placed on a Gee chart, giving a fix of the aircraft's position in less than a minute. Accuracy varied from 0.5 to 5 mi (0.80 to 8.05 km) and Gee had a range of 300–400 mi (480–640 km), accuracy falling with distance. Gee worked well as a homing device but early hopes of it being accurate enough for blind bombing were not realised. Crews appreciated the value of the apparatus for navigation on the return journey, removing the fear of flying into hills and other obstructions. By August 1942, 80 per cent of the bomber force was equipped and 100 per cent by January 1943.

Coverage of the Ruhr was known as the eastern chain and later northern and southern chains were added. Gee was usually ineffective east of the Ruhr and was easy to jam, which began on 4 August 1942, from when Gee fixes were only obtainable over the North Sea and parts of France. Gees loss of accuracy with distance made it a better target-finding device for Luftwaffe raiders over Britain. The signals were encoded to prevent German use but this made it harder for Bomber Command navigators to get Gee fixes. Anti-jamming devices were short-lived in effectiveness as the Germans quickly overcame them but Gee Mk II was easier for navigators to use.

==== Oboe ====
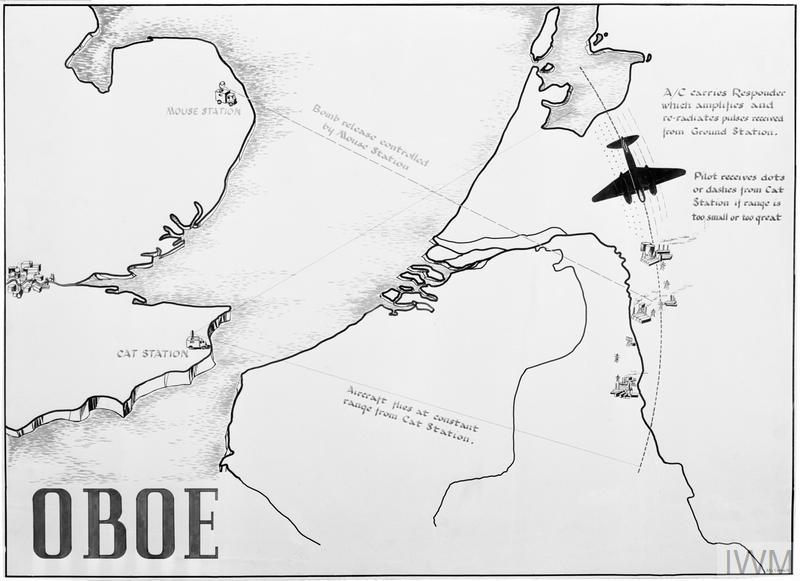
Diagram of the operation of the Oboe system

Oboe was a blind-bombing device controlled by two ground stations in England which measured the distance of an aircraft from them with radar pulses. Cat tracked the aircraft over the target and Mouse calculated the point on the track where the aircraft should bomb. Oboe transmissions did not follow the curvature of the Earth, making the altitude of the aircraft the determinant of range. An aircraft flying at 28,000 ft (8,500 m) could receive Oboe transmissions at about 270 mi (430 km), enough to mark targets in the Ruhr, which led to the device being installed in fast, high-flying Mosquito bombers, which usually navigated with the usual aids until beginning an Oboe run about 10 mi (16 km) from the target. Use of the Mosquito made an Oboe run safer, even when no evasive action could be taken before bombing. Accuracy was measured in hundreds of yards which increased with greater experience of the aircrews and ground operators.

Oboe could be jammed and suffer interference from Monica and other Bomber Command devices. Oboe Mk I operated on a wavelength of 1.5 metres, K Oboe was in general use from mid-June 1943 and was free from jamming. Centimetric Oboe Mk II and Mk III retained the effectiveness of Oboe until the end of the war but are beyond the scope of this article; rushing Oboe Mk I into service delayed Mk II but jamming did not begin until August 1943. Cat and Mouse stations could handle only one aircraft at a time and a marking run took ten minutes, allowing six bomb- or marker-runs per hour. The illumination from a Target Indicator bomb usually lasted for six minutes, guaranteeing four-minute gaps in marking. A failed marking run increased the gap to fourteen minutes. The introduction of multi-channel control and more ground stations eventually increased the concentration of Oboe marking. From the introduction of Oboe in December 1942 until the end of the war, Oboe aircraft made 9,624 sorties on 1,797 raids.

=== 1943 ===
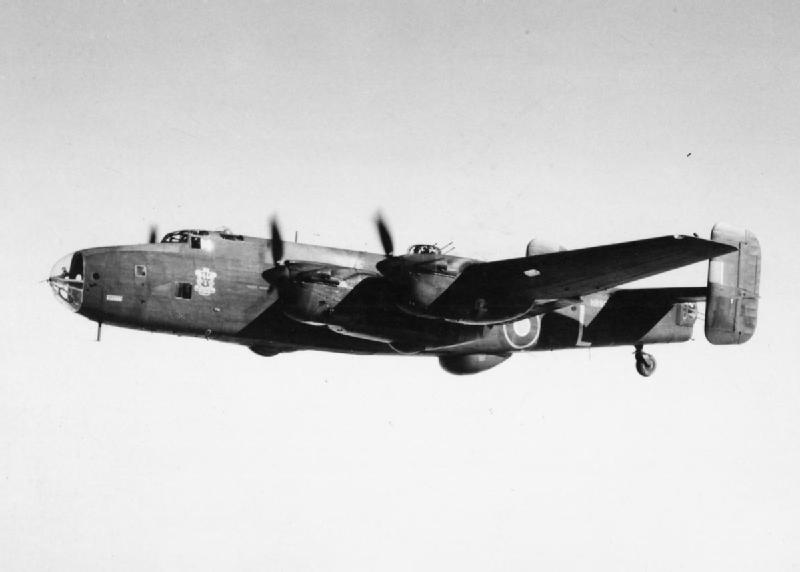
RAF Halifax B Mk II

At the beginning of 1943, the political resolve of the British government to support the bomber offensive remained and more resources had been provided. A plan to create a 4,000-strong bomber force had been abandoned as unrealisable but the diversion of Bomber Command squadrons to RAF Coastal Command and overseas commands was constrained and its expansion continued. A blind bombing device, Oboe, had been introduced on the night of 20/21 December 1942, H2S, a ground-scanning radar, on 30/31 January and a new target indicator bomb had come into service on 16/17 January. The new devices and the increase in the number of heavy bombers promised a large improvement in the quantity of bombs dropped and in accuracy of aim.

For the first time since day bombing was abandoned in 1940, Bomber Command was released from the constraints occasioned by the adoption of night bombing. The tactical use of the new devices was developed quickly but the new equipment had limitations. Oboe had a range which was little beyond the Ruhr and research on repeater aircraft to extend its range was stopped because H2S was expected to be a better system and only a few aircraft could use the device simultaneously; although Oboe had the potential for a vast improvement in target finding, it was not of pinpoint accuracy. H2S could be installed on any aircraft but was complicated, difficult to use and emitted radiation which could be detected, paradoxically exposing the aircraft to interception. Gee remained useful as a means of navigation on return journeys but required development to overcome German jamming.

==== Target Indicator bomb ====
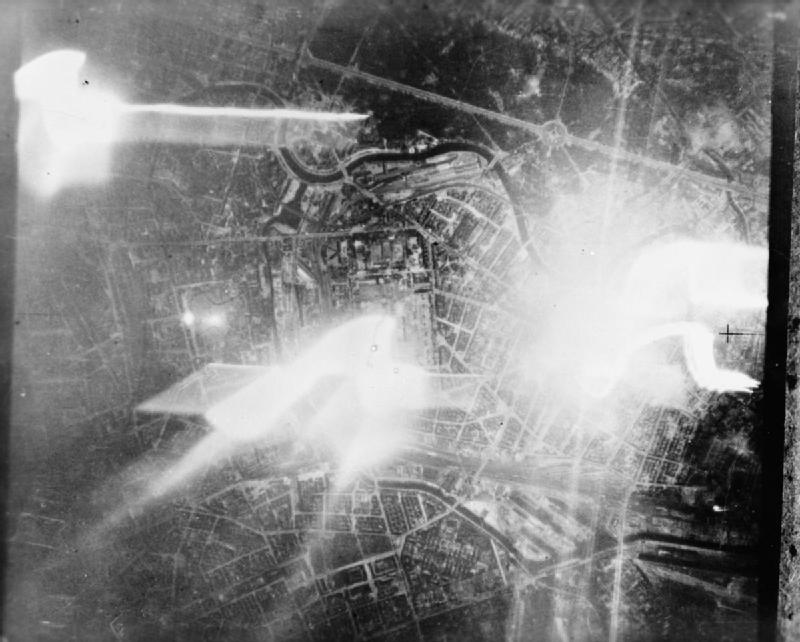
Photograph of TIs over Berlin C4925

The Target Indicator bomb (TI) was an aerodynamic metal case which ejected coloured pyrotechnic candles at a set height by a barometric fuze. If set to ignite immediately they made a cascade. When sky marking, the candles were on parachutes and if fuzed for ground burst, they created a pool of coloured fire. The usual 250 lb (110 kg) TI covered an area on the ground of about 100 yd (91 m) and a ground burst TI contained some candles which were explosive, to deter attempts to extinguish them. The TI was introduced on the night of 16/17 January 1943 and was a great success, making pathfinding a practical operation of war.

==== H2S ====
H2S was a device for navigation and blind bombing by radar. The downward emissions of the radar were reflected and received as echoes which were distinctive of the ground. Built-up areas returned echoes different from fields and forests, land echoes could be distinguished from the sea and sea echoes from those of a ship. The radar had a scanner which swept vertically and the echoes were detected by a receiver and displayed on a cathode-ray tube, with a sweep rotating at the same speed as the scanner, giving an impression of the ground. The contrast between water and land made coasts, lakes and rivers particularly recognisable. Towns also stood out and sometimes railway lines, from which the navigator could determine his position. When closer to the target, if it was recognisable, an H2S bombing run could be made; if the target could not be distinguished the bomber could make a timed run from a landmark in the vicinity. Since the device was airborne its range was limited only to that of its aircraft. The apparatus was limited by echoes from towns and cities, which were harder to distinguish than those from countryside and town.

H2S was inferior to Oboe for blind bombing except on coastal targets like Hamburg. Being a transmitter, H2S disclosed itself to the Germans as soon as enough parts had been recovered from shot-down bombers to analyse its characteristics. German detectors could find a bomber stream and direct night-fighters into it. Once Bomber Command began to use centimetric H2S in January 1943, it was inevitable that the Germans would retrieve one from a crashed bomber and realise that it was similar to air-to-surface-vessel radar (ASV) used by Coastal Command to detect surfaced submarines. In October 1943, beyond the scope of this article, the Germans introduced the Naxos radar detector in night-fighters and U-boats. By mid-January 1943, only 10 Halifax bombers and 13 Stirlings carried H2S; the rate of production was slow and by May 1943, no more than 18 H2S-equipped bombers had participated in one raid; by August, 840 H2S sets had been manufactured.

== Prelude ==
=== German air defences ===
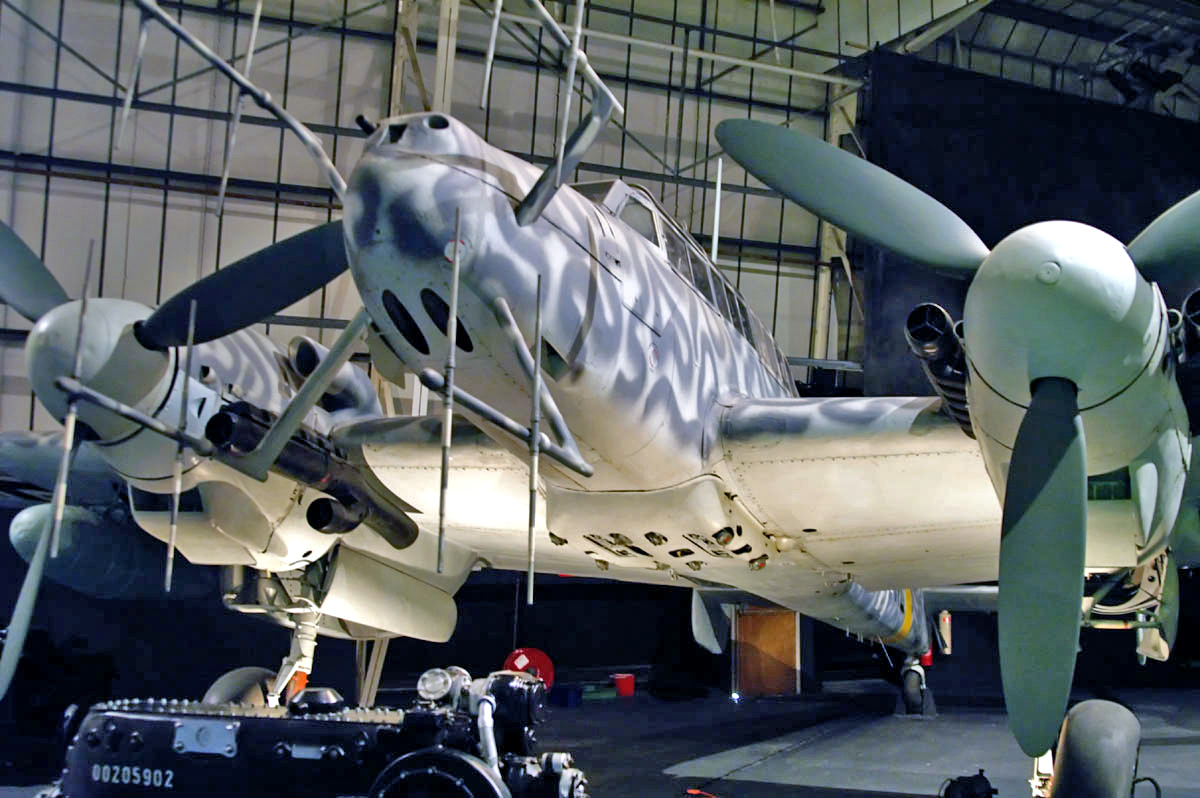
ME-110G-2 night fighter at RAF Hendon

The threat of Anglo-American strategic bombing had been a concern to German strategists since 1940 at the latest. After the Fall of France, a belt of Freya radar stations was built to give early warning of aircraft entering German-controlled airspace, from Denmark south to Switzerland. Freya lacked the accuracy needed for ground-controlled interception of aircraft and was supplemented later in 1940 by Würzburg radar stations which were accurate enough to guide Flak and night fighters, a Würzburg-guided Flak battery shooting down a bomber in September 1940. In October Oberst (Colonel) Josef Kammhuber established three night-fighter zones on the approaches to the Ruhr. The zones were 56 mi (90 km) long and 12 mi (19 km) wide, with a battalion of searchlights and two Würzburg radars in each.

A night-fighter could be guided to within 55 yd (50 m) of an aircraft and then attack when the aircraft was illuminated by the searchlights, a procedure called Helle Nachtjagd (Henaja [Illuminated night fighting]). Forward zones were established along the coast, without searchlights, known as Dunkel Nachtjagd (Dunaja [Dark Nightfighting]). The system lacked effectiveness on cloudy nights, the range of the Würzburg radar [6–31 mi (9.7–49.9 km)] was too short and it could not Identify friend or foe, which led occasionally to attacks on friendly night fighters; some night fighter crews disliked ground control for the loss of flexibility. The German system had not been centralised to sift the information provided by radar, searchlights, wireless interception and direction finding to co-ordinate Flak and night-fighters. To the end of 1940, the new system was credited with the shooting down of 42 bombers by night fighters and 30 by Flak. (Note: Data from Freya sets went to the navy (Kriegsmarine) and the Luftwaffe; the Luftwaffe forwarded it to Luftflotten (Air Fleets) and to Luftgaue (Air Districts, commanding the Flak) and to the Reichsluftfahrtministerium (RLM, Air Ministry) in Berlin.)

Map of a section of the Kammhuber Line stolen by Agent Tegal

The system was extended with a line of Henaja about 20 mi (32 km) wide which, by March 1941, ran 430 mi (690 km) from the Danish–German frontier to Maubeuge in France. Another Henaja belt 45 mi (72 km) long was built between Frankfurt and Mannheim later in the year. Three Würzburg guided the searchlights to illuminate bombers as they entered the zone. Dunaja were extended in circumference and the chain was extended along the coasts of France and the Low Countries and around Berlin. Late in 1941 an improved Würzburg with a 50 mi (80 km)-range and the Seeburg plotting table (Seeburg-Tisch) came into service. Kammhuber used the new equipment to revise the night defence system by increasing the width of Henaja from 25–60 mi (40–97 km) with Dunaja in front of them. Kammhuber intended to introduce Dunaja behind the Kammhuber Line, placed Freya stations on either side and installed master searchlights. The system was introduced in September but proved to be too complex and the number of interceptions decreased.

In the spring of 1942 the depth of the belt of searchlights was reduced to 6 mi (9.7 km) and widened to 12 mi (19 km). A new Konaja (combined) method was intended to counter the new and faster four-engined bombers coming into service with Bomber Command but the risk of the Flak shooting down night-fighters was too great and the system was a failure. In 1941, Bomber Command losses rose to 3.6 per cent from the 2.9 per cent of 1940. During a raid on Berlin on the night of 7/8 November, 12.4 per cent of the 169 bombers were shot down. The night-fighter force shot down 433 bombers and by the end of the year, nine Gruppen and one Staffel were in action. The confused and overlapping jurisdictions of the German defence against night attacks were exacerbated by the lack of effectiveness of the British night bomber offensive and this complacency was not shaken by the entry of the United States into the war in December.

Because of the diversion of night-fighters to the Eastern front and the Mediterranean, by February 1942, there were 265 night-fighters in the west, of an establishment of 367, only half of which were operational. The British resorted to a deliberate campaign of area bombing which immediately increased the amount of destruction achieved by Bomber Command. The bomb tonnage dropped had increased from 37,000 long tons (38,000 t) in 1941 to 50,000 long tons (51,000 t) in 1942. The German night defence was not prepared for the change in British methods and the introduction of GEE, the first night navigation aid. The British ended the individual timing of bomber sorties in favour of the concentration of all the bombers in space and time, which made most of the Kammhuber Line redundant, leaving only a few fighters able to attack the bombers. On the 1,000-bomber raid on Cologne, the bombers spent only two hours over Europe, the stream was 18 mi (29 km) wide and only 25 night-fighters could engage the bombers, just over ten per cent of the total; bomber losses fell from 3.6 to 3.0 per cent. In 1942, Bomber Command had been able to inflict considerable damage on several occasions but had failed consistently to disrupt the German war economy.

==== Himmelbett ====
During 1942, the night-fighter command organisation Fliegerkorps XII abolished its Nachjagddivision for three Jagddivisionen on 1 May and by February 1943, 477 night-fighters were available from an establishment of 653, of which 330 were operational, double that of 1942, 90 per cent of which were in the west. Nearly all of the night-fighters carried Lichtenstein, an aircraft interception radar (AI), with a maximum range of 3,000 yd (1.7 mi; 2.7 km) and a minimum range of 20 yd (18 m), sufficient to track a bomber after ground control had brought the night-fighter to within 2 mi (3.2 km). Despite the weight of the apparatus and aerodynamic penalty of its aerial array causing a loss of at least 25 mph (40 km/h) in speed, night-fighter interceptions increased to the extent that searchlight illumination was made redundant and the lights were transferred to the local Flak units around cities.

By June the Kammhuber Line had been extended southwards towards Paris and northwards to the north coast of Denmark. Kammhuber refused to allow night-fighters to roam freely but made the line more flexible, by deepening the Dunaja zone to 124 mi (200 km) either side of the Henaja to exploit the increased range of Freya and Würzburg, which created the Himmelbett system. In each sector, one Würzburg tracked the bomber and another the night-fighter until it was close enough for the crew to use its Lichtenstein AI for the attack. A zone was limited to one night-fighter but they overlapped by 50 per cent, enabling three night-fighters to operate in one area. GEE was jammed from August, limiting its usefulness to no further than the European coast. Much of the airspace of Europe remained undefended and bomber streams made all but a few night-fighters ineffective, which limited the capacity of German night defences to shoot down no more than about 6 per cent of Bomber Command sorties.

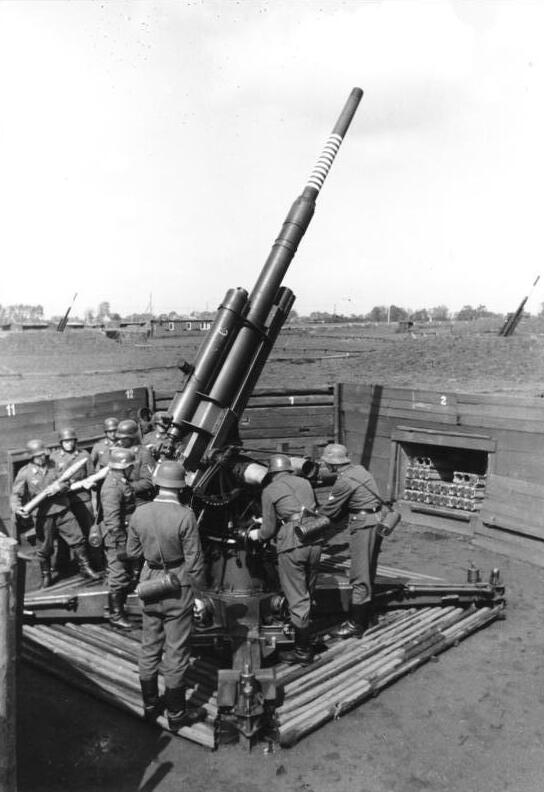
88 mm Flak battery in firing position

The German night defences managed to shoot down 687 bombers in 1942, 63 per cent more than in 1941 for a loss of 97 night-fighters, 63 per cent more than in 1941 and on 10 September Fliegerkorps XII shot down its 1,000th bomber, 649 by Dunaja, 200 by Henaja, 140 by intruder operations over Britain and 11 bombers crashed after being blinded by searchlights. Night-fighters and Flak were shooting down an average of 5.6 per cent of Bomber Command aircraft per raid by the autumn. The performance of Flak also showed an improvement, from July to August 1942, Bomber Command reported the loss of 696 bombers, 269 thought to have been destroyed by night-fighters, 193 by Flak and 334 loses to unknown causes; 1,394 aircraft were damaged, 153 were hit by night-fighters and 941 by Flak.

By the end of the year, the Luftwaffe had faced 77,500 night sorties, shooting down 2,859 bombers, a rate of 3.6 per cent and damaged far more. In 1940 Bomber Command lost a bomber crashed in Britain for every 32 sorties and in 1942 the rate had increased to one in twenty. To the end of 1942, the Luftwaffe had dropped 67,000 long tons (68,000 t) of bombs on Britain and the RAF had dropped 78,579 long tons (79,840 t) on Germany and 22,537 long tons (22,899 t) on the occupied territories. According to post-war research by the Allies, bombing cut German production by 0.7 to 2.5 per cent in 1942, compared to the devotion of 33 per cent of the British war economy to the bomber offensive.

Despite the big increase in the German anti-aircraft effort, such concern for the future as existed did not prevent 150 Flak batteries from being transferred to Italy. Only the Generalluftzeugmeister, Erhard Milch, in charge of Luftwaffe aircraft production, foresaw the crisis that would ensue if fighter output was not given greater emphasis. The advent of British four-engined bombers had increased by 70 per cent the bomb tonnage carried by Bomber Command. Milch predicted that the Anglo-American air fleets would swamp the German air defences and destroy the war economy. On 21 March 1942, Milch advocated to Reichsmarshall Hermann Göring, commander in chief of the Luftwaffe and Hans Jeschonnek, the chief of staff of Oberkommando der Luftwaffe (High Command of the Air Force) the creation of an air umbrella. Milch told Goering that his target of 360 new fighters per month would be insufficient even if it were increased to 3,600, which Jeschonnek dismissed by saying that he would not know what to do with 360 new fighters a month. During the spring of 1943, the Germans increased the ground anti-aircraft defences in the Ruhr; by July there were more than 1,000 large Flak (anti-aircraft) guns (88 mm guns or larger) and 1,500 lighter guns (most being 20 mm and 37 mm) about a third of the anti-aircraft guns in Germany, which needed 600,000 men, women and boys to operate.

=== Ruhr ===
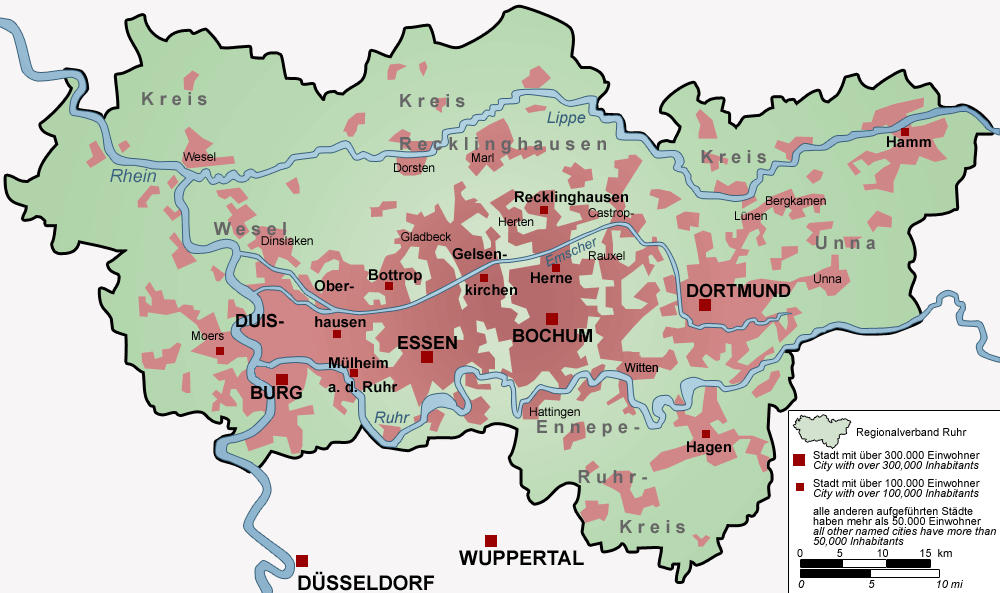
Map of the Ruhr conurbation

The Ruhr industrial region enclosed the valleys of the Ruhr and Wupper rivers and was 40 mi (64 km) from east to west and 25 mi (40 km) from north to south, enclosing an area of about 1,000 sq mi (2,600 km^{2}). Most of the valleys had been built over by fourteen towns creating a conurbation covering 26 sq mi (67 km^{2}), with a population of about 4,115,000. The most industrialised area lay between Dortmund and Duisburg covered an area of 250 sq mi (650 km^{2}) with 3,000,000 of the Ruhr population. The region was the most industrial in Germany, with 71 per cent of the output of coking coal and 61.5 per cent of its pig iron and steel and 67 per cent of the special steels essential in the rest of the German economy. From 1940, many foreign workers, prisoners of war and slave labourers were brought to the Krupp works at Essen, already a city of 670,000 people.

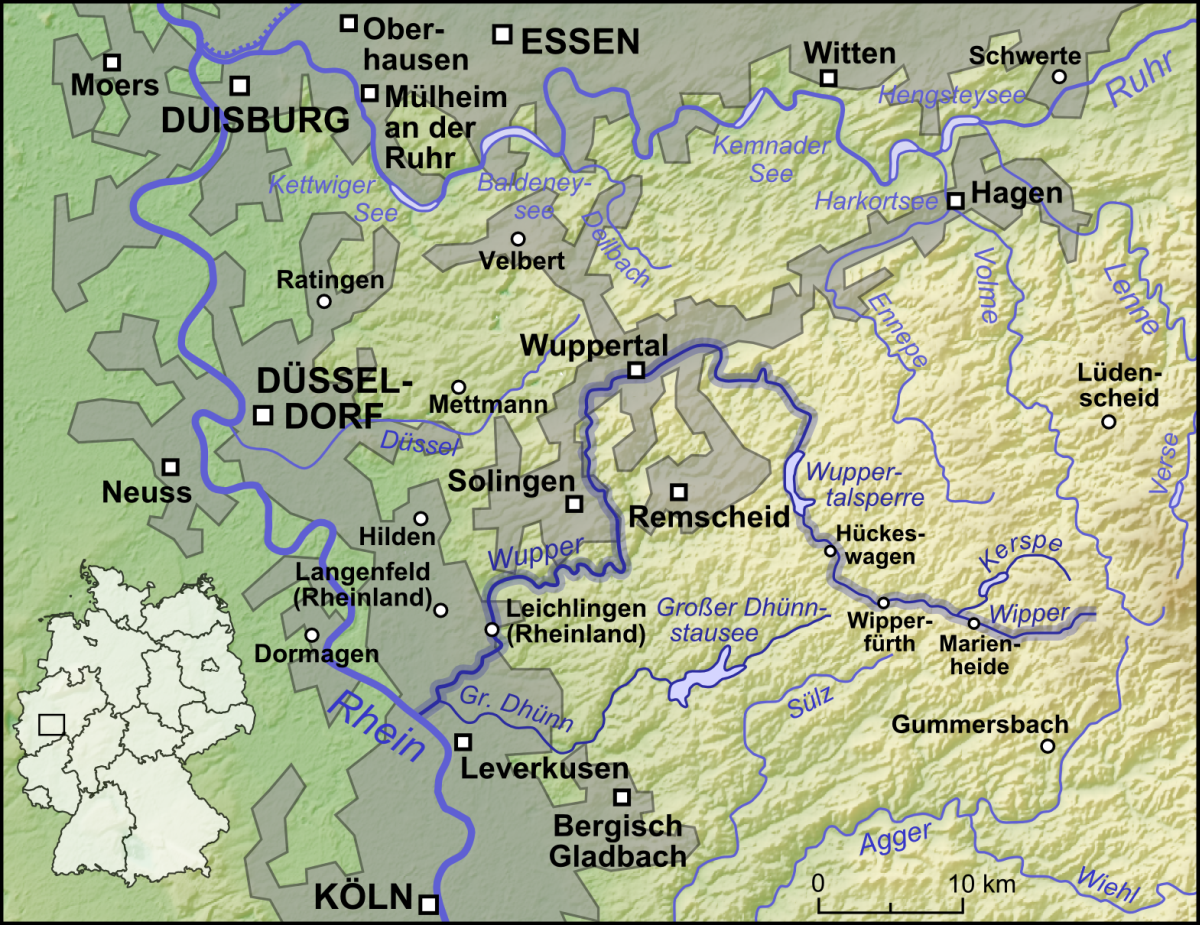
Map of the Wupper river and the southern Ruhr

The main Krupp works in the Essen town centre covered 2 sq mi (5.2 km^{2}), a subsidiary on the edge of town another 0.34 sq mi (0.88 km^{2}) and from 1940 became important targets of the British strategic bombing strategy. The mining industries of the region employed another 16 per cent of the population. The most important towns were Essen, Cologne and Duisburg, site of the largest inland port in Europe. In 1941, Krupps had built the Krupp decoy site (Kruppsche Nachtscheinanlage) at Velbert 1.9 mi (3 km) south of Baldney See, with illumination suggesting a poorly blacked-out industrial site and railway goods yards. The decoy was successful before the advent of British night navigation and blind bombing devices late in 1942 and early 1943. On the outskirts of Essen there were hydrogenation plants close to the Gelsenkirchen-Benzin works at Nordstern and Hydrierwerke-Scholven at Buer which had an output of 566,000 long tons; 634,000 short tons (575,000 t) of aviation fuel a year. Before 1943, Krupps had been hit by 48 bombs and 1,515 incendiaries and the decoy site by 70 bombs and 5,665 incendiaries.

== Battle ==
Date	Target	Notes
5 March 5/6 March	Essen	442 aircraft, 131 Wellingtons, 94 Halifaxes, 52 Stirlings, 157 Lancasters, 8 Mosquitos. First wave Halifaxes, Wellingtons and Stirlings second, Lancasters third. Bomb load was 67 per cent incendiary and 33 per cent high explosive, a third with long-delay fuzes, all dropped in under an hour. There were 56 early returns (13 per cent) including 3 Oboe Mosquitos, due to mechanical defects and other causes; 362 crews claimed to have bombed on target but only 153 succeeded in bombing inside a 3 mi (4.8 km) radius. Losses were 4 Wellingtons, 3 Halifaxes, 3 Stirlings and 4 Lancasters. Photographic reconnaissance (PR) showed 160 acres (65 ha) of destruction in the city centre; 53 buildings at the Krupp works were destroyed. German records showed 457–482 people killed, 3,018 houses destroyed, 2,166 seriously damaged.
9 March	Ruhr	8 Mosquitos, no loss
10/11 March	Essen, Mulheim	2 Mosquitos, no loss
12/13 March	Essen	457 aircraft, 158 Wellingtons, 156 Lancasters, 91 Halifaxes, 42 Stirlings and 10 Mosquitos, Krupps marked by Oboe Mosquitos, later bombing drifted to the north-west. PR showed 30 per cent more damage than on 5/6 March. Losses were 23 aircraft, 6 Wellingtons, 8 Lancasters, 7 Halifaxes, 2 Stirlings; 5 per cent, 169–322 people killed, including 64 men, 45 women, 19 children, 4 soldiers, 61 foreign workers and 5 POW; c. 500 houses destroyed. German records place a third of the bombs outside Essen, with 39 people killed in other towns, Bottrop worst hit.
26/27 March	Duisburg	455 aircraft, 173 Wellingtons, 157 Lancasters, 114 Halifaxes, 2 Stirlings, 9 Mosquitos; six losses 3 Wellingtons, 1 Lancaster, 1 Halifax, 1 Mosquito (first Oboe loss) 1.3 per cent. Five Oboe Mosquitos returned early and one shot down, along with cloud cover, gave a widely scattered raid. German records show 11 people killed, 36 injured, 15 houses destroyed and 70 damaged.
29/30 March	Bochum	149 Wellingtons and 8 Oboe Mosquitos while Main Force raided Berlin; 12 Wellingtons lost; 8 per cent. Moonless cloudy night, Oboe Mosquitos unable to keep to timetable left gaps in sky marking. German records show 28 people killed, 4 buildings destroyed and 35 damaged.
29/30 March	Dortmund	1 Mosquito, no loss
3/4 April	Essen	348 aircraft, 225 Lancasters, 113 Halifaxes, 10 Mosquitos), 21 losses, 12 Halifaxes, 9 Lancasters; 6 per cent. Sky marking and ground markers depending on the weather, caused some Main Force aircrew confusion but the best bombing photographs on Essen yet. German records show 118 killed, 88 civilians, 10 Flak crew, 2 railway workers, 2 police and 16 French workers, 458 people wounded; 635 buildings destroyed and 526 badly damaged.
8/9 April	Duisburg	392 aircraft (156 Lancasters, 73 Halifaxes, 56 Stirlings, 10 Mosquitos), 19 losses, 7 Wellingtons, 6 Lancasters, 3 Halifaxes, 3 Stirlings, 4.8 per cent. Pathfinder marking spoilt by thick cloud and bombing widely scattered; 36 people killed, 40 buildings destroyed, 72 badly damaged and 15 other towns reported damage.
9/10 April	Duisburg	104 Lancasters and 5 Mosquitos, 8 Lancasters lost. German sources recorded 27 people killed and 50 houses destroyed; bombs dropped all over the Ruhr.
26/27 April	Duisburg	561 aircraft (215 Lancasters, 135 Wellingtons, 119 Halifaxes, 78 Stirlings, 14 Mosquitos), 17 losses, 7 Halifaxes, 5 Wellingtons, 3 Lancasters, 2 Stirlings 3 per cent. Pathfinders claimed accurate marking but PR showed most bombing to the north-east of the city. The Main Force may have bombed early or been spoofed by decoy fires. German records show 130–207 people killed, 300 buildings destroyed and six other cities hit by bombs. Four Mosquitos from 2 Group bombed three hours later, then dived for home. The group comprised light and medium bombers and was transferred from Bomber Command on 1 June 1943.
30 April/1 May	Essen	305 aircraft (190 Lancasters, 105 Halifaxes, 10 Mosquitos), 12 losses, 6 Lancasters and 6 Halifaxes, 3.9 per cent. Cloud expected over Essen and sky marking (musical Wanganui) was used, 238 crews claiming to have bombed the target. German record show scattered bombing with 53 people killed, 218 injured, 189 buildings destroyed, 237 badly damaged, Krupp works hit and ten other towns hit, Bottrop by 86 HE bombs.
4/5 May	Dortmund	596 aircraft (255 Lancasters, 141 Halifaxes, 110 Wellingtons, 80 Stirlings, 10 Mosquitos), 31 losses, 12 Halifaxes, 7 Stirlings, 6 Lancasters, 6 Wellingtons, 5.6 per cent; 7 aircraft crashed in England. PFF marking accurate but some backing-up dropped short and some bombers spoofed by a decoy fire but half of Main Force bombed within a 3 mi (4.8 km) radius, severely damaging central and northern districts. German records show 693 people killed, including 200 POW and 1,075 people injured; 1.218 buildings destroyed and 2,141 severely damaged, including two steel foundries and the docks.
13/14 May	Bochum	442 bombers (135 Halifaxes, 104 Wellingtons, 98 Lancasters, 95 Stirlings, 10 Mosquitos), 24 losses 13 Halifaxes, 6 Wellingtons, 4 Stirlings and 1 Lancaster, 5.4 per cent. Bombing began accurately but after 15 minutes decoy markers diverted much of the bombing. German records show 302 people killed, 394 buildings destroyed and 716 badly damaged.
16/17 May	Cologne, Düsseldorf	c. 2 Mosquitos, no loss
23/24 May	Dortmund	826 bombers (348 Lancasters, 199 Halifaxes, 151 Wellingtons, 120 Stirlings, 13 Mosquitos), 38 losses, 18 Halifaxes, 8 Lancasters, 6 Stirlings, 6 Wellingtons, 4.6 per cent. PFF marked in clear weather and much of the centre, north and east of the city were hit. German records show 599 people killed, 1,275 injured and 25 people missing; about 2,000 buildings destroyed, many being industrial concerns like the Hoesch steelworks where production stopped.
25/26 May	Düsseldorf	729 aircraft (323 Lancasters, 169 Halifaxes, 142 Wellingtons, 113 Stirlings, 12 Moaquitos), 27 losses, 9 Lancasters, 8 Stirlings, 6 Wellingtons, 4 Halifaxes, 3.6 per cent. Two cloud layers made marking very difficult for the PFF; decoy markers and fires caused scattered bombing. Thirty people were killed and 50–100 buildings destroyed.
27/28 May	Essen	518 aircraft (274 Lancasters, 151 Halifaxes, 81 Wellingtons, 12 Mosquitos), 23 losses, 11 Halifaxes, 6 Lancasters, 5 Wellingtons, 1 Mosquito, 4.4 per cent. Cloudy weather led to sky marking, bombing was scattered, many dropped short but damage was inflicted on the city centre and northern districts. German records showed 196 people killed and 547 injured; 488 buildings destroyed and ten other towns nearby were bombed.
29/30 May	Wuppertal Barmen	719 bombers attacked (292 Lancasters, 185 Halifaxes, 118 Stirlings, 113 Wellingtons, 11 Mosquitos), 33 losses, 10 Halifaxes, 8 Stirlings, 8 Wellingtons, 7 Lancasters, 4.6 per cent. The Barmen district was attacked; PFF and Main Force marking were excellent and the bombing caused a big fire in the old town. Many fire brigade and local government personnel were away for the week-end and the remaining firemen were overwhelmed. About 1,000 acres (400 ha), nearly 80 per cent of the town was burned down and about 3,400 people were killed. Five of the six biggest factories were destroyed, along with 211 other business premises and 4,000 houses; 71 factories and 1,800 houses were seriously damaged, more than double that of the worst previous air raid on Germany and the death toll was five times higher.
11/12 June	Düsseldorf	783 aircraft attacked (326 Lancasters, 202 Halifaxes, 99 Stirlings, 13 Mosquitos), 38 losses, 14 Lancasters, 12 Halifaxes, 10 Wellingtons and 2 Stirlings, 4.9 per cent. PFF marking was accurate until a backup marker Mosquito dropped target indicators 14 mi (23 km) to the north-east and part of the Main Force bombed open country. The accurately aimed bombs destroyed 130 acres (53 ha) of the town centre and local reports described a fire 5.0 mi × 3.1 mi (8 km × 5 km) in the old town, city centre, Derendorf and the south end of the city. There were reports of 8,882 fires, 1,444 of them large; 1,292 people were killed and 140,000 made homeless. The bombing stopped production in 42 industrial concerns involved in the war effort, 35 suffered cuts in output, 20 military buildings were hit and 8 ships were sunk or damaged.
11/12 June	Cologne, Duisburg	5 Mosquitos
12/13 June 1943	Bochum	503 aircraft (323 Lancasters, 167 Halifaxes, 11 Mosquitos) 24 losses, 14 Lancasters, 10 Halifaxes, 4.8 per cent. Target covered by cloud but Oboe sky marking enabled Main Force to hit accurately the city centre. PR photographs revealed that 130 acres (53 ha) of the centre had been destroyed. German records revealed 312 people killed, 449 buildings destroyed and 916 severely damaged.
14/15 June	Oberhausen	203 aircraft (197 Lancasters, 6 Mosquitos), 17 losses, all Lancasters, 8.4 per cent. Cloud covered the target but accurate Oboe-Mosquito sky marking (Observers on the ground reported the markers over the Altstadt.) German records showed 85 people killed, 258 injured, 267 buildings destroyed, 584 badly damaged.
14/15 June	Cologne	2 Mosquitos, no loss
16/17 June	Cologne	212 aircraft (202 Lancasters, 10 Halifaxes), losses, 14 Lancasters, 6.6 per cent. PFF heavy bombers marked cloud covered target with H2S radar, some sets giving trouble. Sky marking was late and lacking in quantity, leading to scattered bombing by Main Force. PR revealed 16 industrial premises hit including the Kalk chemical works; German records show 147 people killed and 213 injured.
17/18 June	Cologne and Ruhr	3 Mosquitos, no loss
19/20 June	Cologne, Duisburg, Düsseldorf	6 Mosquitos, no loss
20/21 June	Düsseldorf	1 Mosquito, no loss
21/22 June	Krefeld	705 aircraft, 262 Lancasters, 209 Halifaxes, 117 Stirlings, 105 Wellingtons, 12 Mosquitos, 44 losses, 17 Halifaxes, 9 Lancasters, 9 Wellingtons, 9 Stirlings; 6.2 per cent. Full moon, many night-fighter interceptions, 12 PFF losses. The bright night led to near-perfect PFF Oboe-Mosquito ground marking and backing up but PFF heavy bombers, 619 aircraft of Main Force bombing on the markers, 75 per cent within 3 mi (4.8 km) of town centre, 2,306 long tons (2,343 t) of bombs, raising a huge fire. Local records showed 1,056 people killed, 4,550 injured, 47 per cent of town centre destroyed, 5,517 buildings destroyed, 72,000 people rendered destitute, 20,000 billeted in suburbs, 30,000 accommodated by friends and relatives, 20,000 evacuated.
21/22 June	Hamborn (Duisburg)	1 Mosquito, no loss
22 June	Hüls	183 aircraft, 172 B-17, 11 YB-40, 16 losses; 8.74 per cent. USAAF daylight raid on Chemische Werke Hüls a synthetic rubber plant. 422 short tons (383 t) bombs, 88.6 short tons (80.4 t) landed inside the plant complex. Plant closed for a month and Buna production not fully restored for six months. Records show 186 people killed and 1,000 wounded.
22/23 June	Mülheim	557 aircraft, 242 Lancasters, 155 Halifaxes, 93 Stirlings, 55 Wellingtons, 12 Mosquitos, 35 losses, 12 Halifaxes, 11 Stirlings, 8 Lancasters, 4 Wellingtons; 6.3 per cent. PFF marked accurately through thin layer of cloud and caused many fires, town fire brigade overwhelmed. Later marking and bombing crept northwards and cut off Mülheim from Oberhausen. Centre and north of Mülheim and the east end of Oberhausen severely damaged. German records show 578 people killed, 1,174 injured, 1,135 houses destroyed and 12,673 damaged.
22/23 June	Cologne	4 Mosquitos, no loss
23/24 June	Cologne, Duisburg	6 Mosquitos, no loss
24/25 June	Wuppertal. Elberfeld	630 aircraft, 251 Lancasters, 171 Halifaxes, 101 Wellingtons, 98 Stirlings, 9 Mosquitos, 34 losses, 10 Halifaxes, 10 Stirlings, 8 Lancasters, 6 Wellingtons; 3.4 per cent. Elberfeld end of the city attacked, PFF marked accurately and Main Force bombed on target but creep-back more pronounced than usual; 30 aircraft bombed targets in the western Ruhr, probably caused by recent losses among experienced crews. Local records show 1,800 people killed, 2,400 injured, 171 industrial concerns and 3,000 houses destroyed, 53 industrial buildings and 2,500 houses badly damaged.
24/25 June	Duisburg	4 Mosquitos, no loss
25/26 June	Gelsenkirchen	473 aircraft, 214 Lancasters, 134 Halifaxes, 73 Stirlings, 40 Wellingtons, 12 Mosquitos, 30 losses, 13 Lancasters, 7 Halifaxes, 6 Stirlings, 4 Wellingtons; 6.3 per cent. Cloud cover; 5 of 12 Oboe-Mosquitos had unserviceable Oboe sets, Main Force scattered bombs over much of the Ruhr. German reports showed 16 people killed in Gelsenkirchen, 24 buildings destroyed, 3,285 damaged, 2,937 superficially and 21 killed with 58 injured at Solingen 30 mi (48 km) miles distant.
26/27 June	Duisburg	3 Mosquitos, no loss
28/29 June	Cologne	608 aircraft, 367 Lancasters, 169 Halifaxes, 85 Wellingtons, 75 Stirlings, 12 Mosquitos, 25 losses, 10 Halifaxes, 8 Lancasters, 5 Stirlings, 2 Wellingtons; 4.1 per cent. Weather forecast led PFF to have ground marking and sky marking plans and cloud cover led to sky marking; 5 Oboe-Mosquitos dropped out before marking and one failed to drop its markers. The marking was late and intermittent but main Force bombed accurately. German sources showed 4,377 people killed, about 10,000 injured and 230,000 people made homeless, 43 industrial, 6 army and c. 15,000 buildings destroyed.
2/3 July	Cologne, Duisburg	5 Mosquitos, 3 to Cologne, 2 to Duisburg, no loss
3/4 July	Cologne	653 aircraft, 293 Lancasters, 182 Halifaxes, 89 Wellingtons, 76 Stirlings, 13 Mosquitos, 30 losses, 9 Halifaxes, 8 Lancasters, 8 Wellingtons, 5 Stirlings; 4.6 per cent. Aiming point Cologne east of the Rhine, PFF Oboe-Mosquitos and heavy bomber backers-up marked accurately and Main Force delivered a concentrated attack. German records show 588 people killed, c. 1,000 injured, 72,000 rendered homeless. Début of Jagdgeschwader 300 with single-engined day fighters using Wild Boar (Wilde Sau) tactic to exploit light over the target from fires, searchlights and target indicators; Flak limited to a maximum height, above which the Wilde Sau had priority. Four bombers reported being hit by other bombers were probably Wilde Sau attacks. JG 300 claimed 12 bombers but these was shared with the Flak.
3/4 July	Duisburg	4 Mosquitos, no loss
4/5 July	Duisburg	3 Mosquitos, no loss
5/6 July	Cologne	4 Mosquitos, no loss
6/7 July	Cologne, Düsseldorf	4 Mosquitos, no loss
7/8 July	Cologne, Düsseldorf	8 Mosquitos, no loss
8/9 July	Cologne	288 aircraft (282 Lancasters, 6 Mosquitos) losses, 7 Lancasters; 2.5 per cent. Accurate sky marking, Main Force hit north-west and south-west districts not severely hit before. German records show 512 civilians killed; casualties at an army barracks and a POW camp badly hit not known; 19 industrial and 2,381 dwellings destroyed, 48,000 people made destitute. Three raids in a week bombed out 350,000 people.
8/9 July	Duisburg	8 Mosquitos, no loss
9/10 July	Gelsenkirchen	418 aircraft (218 Lancasters, 190 Halifaxes, 10 Mosquitos) 12 losses, 7 Halifaxes, 5 Lancasters; 2.9 per cent. Oboe failed in 5 Mosquitos and one marked 10 mi (16 km) north of the target. German records reported bombing in southern districts, Bochum and Wattenscheid. Gelsenkirchen authorities reported 41 people killed, oil refinery at Scholven and 9 industrial firms hit, light damage elsewhere.
13/14 July	Cologne	2 Mosquitos, no loss
25/26 July	Essen	705 aircraft (294 Lancasters, 221 Halifaxes, 104 Stirlings, 67 Wellingtons, 19 Mosquitos), 26 losses, 10 Halifaxes, 7 Stirlings, 5 Lancasters, 4 Wellingtons; 3.7 per cent. An attempt to exploit the surprise of Window radar-jamming, introduced during the Battle of Hamburg (24–30 July 1943). German records show 500 people killed, 1,208 injured and 12 missing. Severe damage to eastern industrial districts, Krupps suffering the worst damage of the war and 51 other industrial premises destroyed, 83 badly damaged, 2,852 houses destroyed. (Note: Brigadier Samuel E. Anderson, commander of VIII Bomber Command, flew as a observer with 83 Squadron.)
25/26 July	Cologne, Gelsenkirchen	6 Mosquitos 3 to Cologne, 3 to Gelsenkirchen, no loss
27/28 July	Duisburg	3 Mosquitos, no loss
28/29 July	Düsseldorf	3 Mosquitos, no loss
30/31 July	Remscheid	273 aircraft (95 Halifaxes, 87 Stirlings, 82 Lancasters, 9 Mosquitos); 15 losses, 8 Stirlings, 5 Halifaxes, 2 Lancasters; 5.5 per cent. Oboe ground marking very accurate and Main Force bombed on target, 871 long tons (885 t) of bombs destroyed 83 per cent of the town. German records showed 1,120 people killed, 6,700 injured, 107 industrial buildings destroyed and three months' production lost, 3,115 houses destroyed.

=== Operation Chastise, 16/17 May 1943 ===
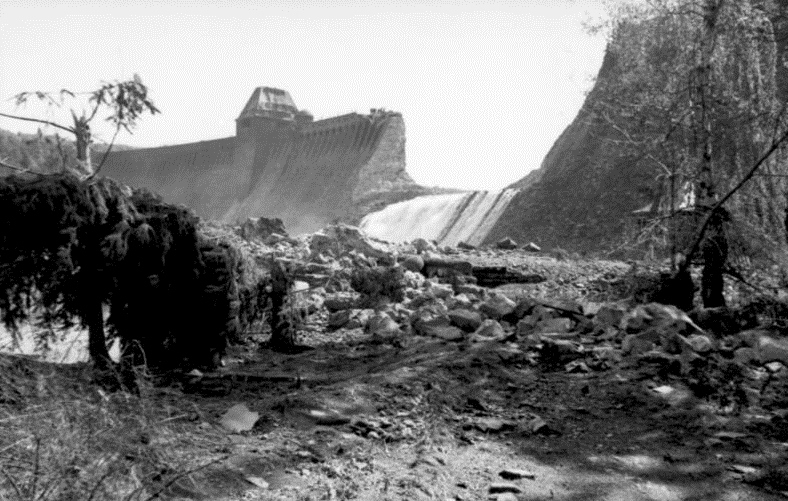
Möhne Dam after the attack

Operation Chastise was a special operation carried out during the battle to disrupt the Ruhr by attacking its sources of water and hydroelectric power. 617 Squadron was formed in secret and trained at short notice to attack the dams above the Ruhr with special bombs. Nineteen Lancasters in three waves were dispatched. Six bombers did not reach the dams (one turning back after losing its bomb and five were shot down). Twelve Lancasters bombed, five against the Möhne Dam, three the Eder Dam, two the Sorpe Dam and one the Schwelme Dam. The Möhne and Eder were breached. The Mohne Reservoir was an important supplier of water to the Ruhr and the flooding caused much damage to road, rail and canals, leading to electricity and water shortages, rationing being necessary until the autumn rains. The Eder Dam was larger but was 60 mi (97 km) distant from the Ruhr and the breach had more effect on Kassel and its vicinity. The Sorpe Dam was only slightly damaged and was able to keep the Ruhr operating during the repairs to the Möhne. Three more aircraft were lost on the return flight, 53 aircrew were killed and three taken prisoner. There were 1,294 civilian casualties, 859 occurring at Neheim-Hüsten where 493 female Ukrainian slave labourers were drowned; another 58 bodies were found around the Eder Dam.

=== Other targets ===
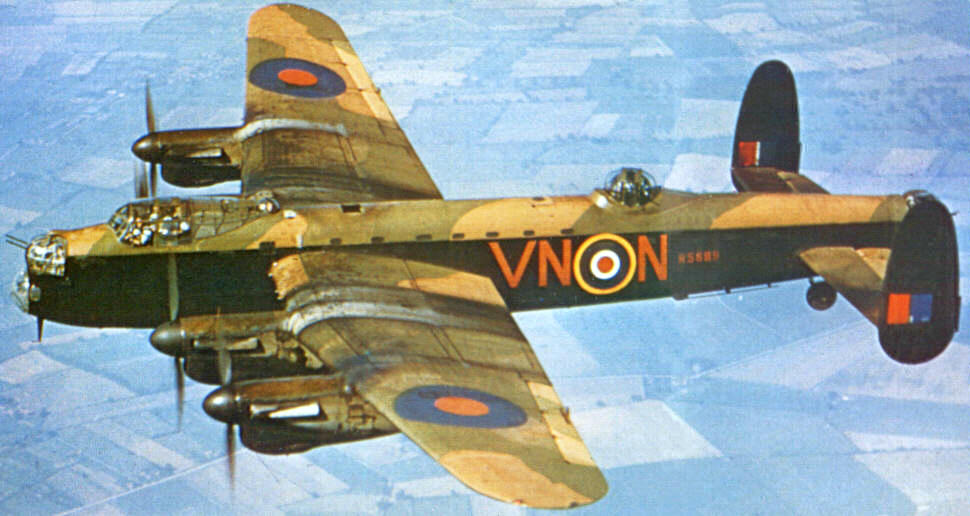
RAF Lancaster bomber VN-N, (R5689) photographed in 1942

Bomber Command raided cities outside the Ruhr during the battle to prevent the Germans from concentrating their defences. On the night of 1/2 March Berlin was attacked by 302 bombers and on the night of 3/4 March Hamburg was raided by 417 bombers. Nuremberg was bombed on the night of 8/9 March by 335 bombers. On the night of 9/10 March Munich was raided by 264 bombers and 314 bombers hit Stuttgart on the night of 11/12 March. Berlin was visited on the night of 27/28 March by 396 bombers and again on 29/30 March by 329 bombers. Kiel was bombed by 577 aircraft on the night of 4/5 April and Frankfurt am Main was bombed by 502 aircraft on the night of 10/11 April. Bomber Command attacked Stuttgart with 562 bombers on the night of 14/15 April. On the night of 16/17 April Bomber Command conducted a raid on Pilsen, on 20/21 April Stettin (now Szczecin) was bombed by 304 aircraft and on the night of 13/14 May, Pilsen was bombed again. In June, raids outside the Ruhr consisted of a 72-aircraft attack on Münster during the night of 11/12 June followed by 60 bombers against Friedrichshafen on the night of 20/21 June. Aachen was bombed by 374 aircraft on the night of 13/14 July.

== Aftermath ==
=== Analysis ===
In 1956 the New Zealand official historian, Henry Thompson, wrote that at Essen, after more than 3,000 sorties and the loss of 138 aircraft, the "Krupp works...and the town...itself contained large areas of devastation" and that Krupp did not resume locomotive production after the second March raid. The battle demonstrated the increasing power of Bomber Command. Targets that hitherto been invulnerable were severely damaged and this appeared to be feasible on targets inside Oboe range. Earlier successes had depended on the weather and occasional opportunities that could not be replicated. Harris saw the Battle of the Ruhr as a beginning and that more cities in Germany would have to be devastated and that the Ruhr would have to be attacked again to keep repaired factories out of production.

In 1981 Matthew Cooper wrote that the most significant event in 1943 for the Luftwaffe was the increase in strategic bombing, the RAF and USAAF dropping 206,188 long tons (209,497 t) of bombs, more than 300 per cent of the 1942 total. Bomber Command dropped 131,000 long tons (133,000 t) of bombs in area attacks and killed about 181,000 civilians. Essen in the Ruhr was attacked on 5/6 March with 1,014 long tons (1,030 t) of bombs, the first of the 43 attacks of the Battle of the Ruhr. The British dispatched 18,506 sorties against targets marked by Oboe, accurate to 200 yd (180 m), dropping about 34,000 long tons (35,000 t) of bombs. In one raid, in fifteen minutes, 90 per cent of Wuppertal-Barmen was destroyed and 2,450 people killed. On 10 April, after visiting Essen to see for himself, Josef Goebbels, the Propaganda Minister, wrote in his diary,

...the damage...is colossal and, indeed, ghastly....The city's building experts estimate that it will take twelve years to repair the damage.

Goebbels blamed Göring and Ernst Udet, the chief of procurement, for negligence on a grand scale. On 8 May, Hitler told Milch that either Luftwaffe tactics or technology was lacking and after meeting Hitler on the same day, Goebbels wrote,

The technical failure of the Luftwaffe results mainly from useless aircraft designs. It is here that Udet bears the fullest measure of blame.

By June the night-fighter force had been increased to 18 Gruppen, five more than at the start of the year but the Himmelbett system limited the number of night-fighters over the Ruhr to 36. Flak that had been diverted to Italy and the Eastern Front was recalled and two or three Flak batteries (Grossbatterien) were assembled at important targets to counter the shorter time that the bombers were over the target. The Ruhr Flak was doubled to 400 batteries of heavy Flak, with more 105 mm and 128 mm anti-aircraft guns, comprising about 40 per cent of the Flak in Germany. In May, Kammhuber made a claim for a night-fighter force of 2,160 aircraft, especially if the US bombers turned to night bombing but Hitler refused to listen. Göring accepted Kammhuber's analysis on 6 July after more evidence of the effectiveness of RAF bombing but by then it was too late. On the night of 24/25 July the Allied bombers began the Battle of Hamburg using H2S, a new navigation aid and jammed German radars with Window (Düppel to the Germans) against which no countermeasures had been prepared, neutralising the Himmelbett system.

In the informal German official history, Germany and the Second World War (1990–2018) Horst Boog wrote that by late July Harris thought that the Ruhr has been reduced to chaos, that German arms production had been substantially cut and that the morale of the population had been undermined, yet the Germans had already begun to disperse industry. Bomber Command had created much more destruction in Essen in 1943 with 5.6 per cent of the Bomber Command effort (3,261 sorties) and 138 losses against the 10 per cent (3,724 sorties) and 201 losses of 1942. Bomber Command overestimated its effect but achieved a reduction of four to six weeks of German industrial output. In its 43 raids on the Ruhr, Bomber Command dispatched about 18,500 bomber sorties for a loss of 872 (4.7 per cent) of the aircraft and 6,000 aircrew; another 2,126 aircraft were damaged, sometimes beyond recovery. The average loss rate was 5 per cent, with losses, damaged and losses not caused by the German anti-aircraft defences (crashed in England due to weather, damaged aircraft written off and crewmembers wounded or killed in returned aircraft) was 16 per cent during the campaign. Oboe was a success and aircraft production exceeded losses, realising a net increase from 663 aircraft in March 1943 to 776 in July.

In his 2006 study of the German war economy, Adam Tooze wrote that Bomber Command severely disrupted German production during the battle. Contemporary sources show that the bombing was a watershed in the development of the German war economy, which has been severely underestimated by later accounts. The Ruhr was the most important source of coking coal and steel in Europe and the main source of components; cutting production in the Ruhr disrupted production all over Germany. The status of the Ruhr was changed from that of the home front to a war zone with an emergency staff placed to control over the regional economy. Workers were accommodated in camps, ready to be sent to factories that were still open but these were expedients. The German night defences could not stop the British from inflicting great disruption on the war economy. Steel production was cut by 200,000 long tons (200,000 t) when Albert Speer, head of the Reich Ministry of Armaments and War Production, was expecting output to increase to 2,800,000 long tons (2,800,000 t), causing a deficit of 400,000 long tons (410,000 t).

Having reorganised the steel allocation system, the German planners were forced into a large cut in the ammunition production programme to compensate. After a doubling of ammunition production in 1942, output increased by only 20 per cent in 1943. All over Germany the destruction in the Ruhr caused shortages of parts, castings and forgings, a Zulieferungskrise (sub-components crisis), which reached far beyond heavy industry. From July 1943 to March 1944, there were no increases in monthly aircraft production for the Luftwaffe and in the rest of the armaments economy there was no increase in production until 1944. Tooze wrote "Bomber Command had stopped Speer's armaments miracle in its tracks", despite the loss of 640 bombers and most of their crews, yet Bomber Command increased in size between February and August 1943 due to the increase in output of the British aircraft industry.

=== Casualties ===
In 1961, Webster and Frankland, in their official history The Strategic Air Offensive against Germany 1939–1945 (volume II), recorded that in February 1943, Bomber Command had an average of 593 crews and aircraft available for operations and 787 in August. During the battle, Ruhr targets were raided 43 times on 39 nights. Bomber Command dispatched 18,506 sorties, in which 872 aircraft failed to return and 2,126 were damaged, with 6,000 aircrew casualties. Some aircraft were badly enough damaged to amount to the loss of the aircraft and crew. The casualty rate (of all natures) was 16 per cent of sorties, 4.7 per cent being losses over Germany. Of 203 Mosquito bomber sorties, two aircraft were lost and from 282 Oboe-Mosquito sorties, there were two losses and six damaged. In 2006, Adam Tooze wrote that the German night defences had inflicted great damage on Bomber Command, shooting down or causing to crash 640 bombers and killing nearly 4,000 aircrew.

=== Dams raid ===
Operation Chastise had a temporary effect on industrial production, through the disruption of the water supply and hydroelectric power. The Eder Valley (Edersee) dam did not supply the Ruhr Area. A spare pumping system had been built for the Ruhr and Organisation Todt rapidly mobilized workers from the construction of the Atlantic Wall to make repairs. Destruction of the Sorpe Dam would have caused significantly more damage but it was a stronger design and less likely to be breached; also it had been made a secondary target. Of the crews on the raid, 53 were killed and three taken prisoner. There were 1,294 casualties, 859 at Neheim-Hüsten where 493 female Ukrainian slave labourers were drowned; another 58 bodies were found around the Eder Dam.
