= History of Velbert =

Velbert is a German town in North Rhine-Westphalia which made up of three former towns: Velbert, Neviges and Langenberg. The town's history began during the Middle Ages.

== Stone Age ==
Although there were no settlements in Velbert, Neviges or Langenberg during the Stone Age, seven types of Neolithic stone tools have been found in the region.

== Middle Ages to 18th century ==
In 875, Velbert was first mentioned as Feldbrahti and was ruled by the abbey at Werden. Around 1050, Lady Adelheid donated the Hof zum Hof (Manor at Manor, a manor in Velbert) and the local church to the abbey. In 1115, Earl Adolf II von Berg was vogt of the abbey. Earl Hermann von Hardenberg owned Hadenberg (later Neviges) in 1145. Neviges was first mentioned around 1150 as Navagis, and Langenberg was first mentioned before 1220 as Langenberge. In 1220 Hermann von Hardenberg and his mother, the widow Hellenburgis, founded a priestly order in the church at Neviges. In 1265, the church of Langenberg was first mentioned; the Homberg (with jurisdiction over Velbert) and Hardenberg county courts were mentioned in 1317 and 1343, respectively. In 1354, Heinrich von Hardenberg and his son (also named Heinrich) sold Hardenberg to Earl Gerhard I. von Jülich-Berg. The earls von Berg became dukes in 1380. In 1496, bailiff Bertram von Gevertzhain (also known as Lützerode) received Hardenberg as a hereditary fiefdom (after paying its debt) from Duke Wilhelm III von Jülich-Berg.

Velbert's first locksmith was mentioned in 1508, and locksmithing remains an important industry. In 1518, Velbert became a benefice with a local priest. Eleven years later, the fiefdom of Hardenberg was owned by the von Bernsau family. After 1570, Velbert, Neviges and Langenberg became Protestant; the first synod of Berg was held in Neviges in 1589. In 1649 Johann Sigismund, the owner of Hardenberg, converted to Catholicism; the Annakirche (Anna's Church) was built in 1670 (replaced by the Klosterkirche St. Mariä Empfängnis in 1728), and the Franciscans became influential in 1676. Construction of the Hardenberg monastery began in 1680.

== 19th century ==
In 1806 Hardenberg became part of the French Grand Duchy of Berg, a municipality ruled first by a director and later by a mayor. In 1808, Velbert also became a municipality; its first mayor was merchant Johannes Mohn. Velbert's Essen-Solinger-Straße (Essen-Solingen Street) was built from 1811 to 1815. In 1813 French rule ended, and two years later the grand duchy (including Velbert) became part of Prussia after the Congress of Vienna. In 1825 Emil Krummacher was priest of the Protestant community of Langenberg, and a Christian revival began. In 1830–31, a 7.5-km narrow-gauge railway was built from Überruhr to Nierenhof (part of Langenberg) to transport coal. In 1854, the railway was nationalised and named Prinz-Wilhelm-Bahn (Prince Wilhelm Railway). In 1840 Velbert's first town hall was built, and over the next few years a number of mansions were constructed. The Prinz-Wilhelm-Bahn was extended from Nierenhof through Langenberg, Neviges and Vohwinkel in 1845, reaching the Düsseldorf-Elberfeld Railway two years later. In 1849 the county's first newspaper, the Zeitungs-Bote, was published.

Carl Wilhelm Sternberg was Velbert's mayor from 1851 to 1862. He reformed municipal management, built a poorhouse and built a Sparkasse (savings bank) in 1852. Velbert's first locksmiths' guild was founded the following year. From 1853 to 1903, mining flourished in Velbert. In 1858, Langenberg mit Hardenberg was divided into the town of Langenberg and the agricultural community of Hardenberg. In 1862, Velbert's Protestant community united as the Evangelische Gemeinde Velbert (Lutheran-Protestant Community of Velbert). The Laakmann paper mill in Langenberg used its first steam engine in 1863. The following year, Langenberg's poorhouse and hospital were dedicated. In 1867 the local chapter of the Allgemeiner Deutscher Arbeiterverein (General German Workers Association) was founded in Neviges, and a local chapter was founded in Velbert the following year. From 1877 to 1910, Rudolf Thomas was mayor of Velbert. In 1880, 41 Velbert companies presented their products at the Düsseldorfer Gewerbeausstellung (Düsseldorf Crafts Exhibition). In 1885 the Deutschfreisinniger Wahlverein (German Liberal Electoral Association) was founded, the Kaiser Wilhelm Hospital was built and construction began on the Damm & Ladwig factory (later BKS GmbH, a noted European lock factory). Three years later, a new town hall was built and Velbert was connected to the German rail system. In 1892, Velbert received a district court. Four years later, Langenberg's first system for generating electric power began. In 1897, Neviges was connected to Elberfeld's tram network and Heiligenhaus separated from Velbert. The following year the Elberfeld-Neviges-Velbert tram system (Bergische kleinbahnen, or Berg Local Railway) was connected and the Catholic Zentrumspartei (Center Party) founded a local chapter. In 1901, Langenberg received a new hospital and a gewerbliche Fortbildungsschule für Handwerker (industrial training school for artisans) was founded in Velbert. Two years later, a Realprogymnasium mit Realschule (middle and grammar school) was founded in Velbert. In 1905, Velbert's public library opened. The following year, Velbert had 116 lock factories and foundries with 5,187 workers.

== World War I ==
In July and August 1914, there was massive panic buying in Velbert, Neviges and Langenberg. On 1 August the mobilization order was announced on Velbert's town square, and 11 days later the first injured German soldiers reached the town. A victory celebration with flags, nationalist speeches and sermons was held on 29 August, and on 26 September the Velbert grammar school held a memorial service for teacher Hugo Wippermann. The Y3 hospital train, built in Langenberg, made its first trip on 19 March 1915. That year Ernst Schwalfenberg established an ironworks, and the Wilhelm Mittelmann company ceased production because of a shortage of raw materials. In 1916, the Gustav Hammel company began producing malleable iron. The following year, there were demonstrations in Velbert for more food. On 2 June 1917 the Velberter Zeitung appealed for a "sacrifice day for our submariners" and commended German submarines, and the Langenberger Zeitung appealed to its readers to buy war bonds on 4 November 1918 (a week before the armistice was signed).

== Weimar Republic ==
On 10 and 11 November 1918 there was an uprising in Velbert, Langenberg and Neviges, with the formation of workers' and soldiers' councils. From January to March 1919, the three towns held their first universal, direct, equal and secret elections. In March 1920 (during the Kapp Putsch) Velbert neared civil war, with fighting between a Reichswehreinheit (Empire military unit) and armed workers at Dalbecksbaum on 16 March.

On 9 September 1922, Neviges became a town. That year a local group of Der Stahlhelm was founded in Velbert; soon afterwards it was banned, only to reform in August 1926.

From January 1923 to July 1925, Velbert, Neviges and Langenberg were occupied by French and Belgian soldiers as part of the occupation of the Ruhr. In 1923, hyperinflation caused difficult living conditions, high unemployment and violent demonstrations. After the 1924 election, a Nazi joined the Langenberg city council.

That year the rail-line extension from Velbert to Heiligenhaus was finished, and the West Velbert station opened on 31 March 1925. From May 1925 to 1929, there was a typhoid epidemic in Neviges. Millennial celebrations were held in Velbert and Neviges in 1925. The following year, Neviges began building a canal and mayor Henry Prahl planned a town modernization. In 1927, Langenberg began work on a canal and Velbert's Jubiläumshalle (Jubilee Hall) was finished. On 15 January 1927, the Langenberg transmission tower went on the air.

Despite a 1927–1929 municipal reorganization, Velbert failed to become a county-level city. In 1928, Neviges lost parts of Nordrath, Richrath, Vossnacken, Wallmichrath and Windrad to Langenberg, and Rottberg, the rest of Richrath and part of Vossnacken to Velbert. That year, the town hall and district court were expanded and connected. In 1929, Velbert's town-hall tower was built and the center of Neviges was redeveloped. On 16 February 1929, the Velberter Heimatmuseum (Heritage Museum) opened in the mayor's house on Friedrichstraße.

From 1930 to 1932, the Great Depression caused reduced working hours, unemployment, hunger, an increase in urban welfare spending and lower tax revenue in Velbert, Langenberg and Neviges which peaked in 1932. Political radicalization developed from 1930 to 1933, and violent clashes between Nazis and Communists in Velbert, Langenberg and Neviges occurred in January 1933.

== Third Reich ==
On 31 January 1933 the Nazi Party held torchlight rallies, and there were street fights between SA members and communists. On 28 February 65 communists from Velbert, Langenberg and Neviges were imprisoned, and a purge of Social Democrats from Velbert's administration and public utilities began on 13 March. In April 1933 and March 1934, communist resistance developed in Velbert, Langenberg and Neviges. On 2 May 1933 the SA occupied the Velbert's union hall, and a German Christians chapter was formed in Langenberg; a Velbert chapter was formed on 3 July. That month, the Gestapo also closed three Catholic clubs in Velbert. In July and August, local chapters of the Reichsluftschutzbund (National Air Raid Protection League) were formed in Velbert, Langenberg and Neviges. On 4 March 1934, Protestant youth clubs in Velbert, Neviges and Langenberg became part of the Hitler Youth. In July, a Confessing Church community began in Velbert.

From 3 December 1934 to November 1938, the 84-house Dorfsiedlung (Village Settlement) was built in Velbert. On 12 March 1935, Hardenberg was renamed Neviges. The first Niederbergisches Musikfest (Niederberg Music Festival) was held in May in Langenberg. From 28 October to 5 November, the Deutsche Gemeindeordnung (German Community Order) abolished municipal elections; aldermen and councilors were appointed by the Nazi district leader. On 12 December, 87 communists were imprisoned. From 1936 to March 1939, the 40-house Auf der Egge development was built in Langenberg. The Gemeinschaftslehrwerkstätte Velbert (Velbert Community Training Workshop) opened on 5 April 1937. On 1 February 1938, the Gestapo banned all Catholic young men's clubs. Velbert and Neviges participated in Kristallnacht during the night of 9–10 November: in Velbert two houses were destroyed and five Jews sent to the Dachau concentration camp, and elderly Jews were tormented in Neviges. In December 1938, the 32-house Lohmüller Berg and Im Holz developments were finished; construction had begun in 1932. In March 1939 Neviges bought the Schloss Hardenberg (Hardenberg Castle), and on Easter all religious schools in Velbert, Neviges and Langenberg were closed.

On 23 and 24 September 1939, the first obituaries of soldiers appeared in the Velberter Zeitung. In 1940 a music school opened in Velbert, and on 20 April the Realgymnasium mit Realschule was renamed for Ulrich von Hutten.

Velbert was first hit from the air on 13 June, and it and Neviges were struck on 24 June. On 25 October, Jud Süß was shown at the Sala cinema. On 19 September 1941, the Velberter Zeitung reported that Jews were required to wear a yellow badge. In 1941, Velbert sponsored a submarine. The following year, housing for Russian forced laborers was built at Böttinger-Platz. On 13 January 1943 the windows of Velbert's Christuskirche were shattered in a bombing raid, and a 26 March 1944 airstrike on Neviges had heavy casualties. During the war Germany's industry at the nearby Ruhr Area was heavily bombed. The Germans built large-scale night-time decoys like the Krupp decoy site (German: Kruppsche Nachtscheinanlage) which was a German decoy-site of the Krupp steel works in Essen. The decoy factory was 10 kilometres (6.2 mi) from the real factory, situated on the Rottberg-Hills in Velbert. During World War II, it was designed to divert Allied airstrikes from the actual production site of the arms factory.

On 7 October 1944, classes in Velbert, Neviges and Langenberg were cancelled except for the Ulrich von Hutten-Schule. Four hundred old men and youths in Velbert, Neviges and Langenberg were sworn into the Volkssturm on 12 November. On 12 April 1945 the Langenberg transmission tower was destroyed by German troops, and on 15 April the Nazi Rheinisches Landesblatt published its last edition in Velbert. On 15 and 16 April Allied troops attacked Neviges, and 60 residents died. On 16 April Langenberg and Neviges were occupied by American troops, followed by Velbert on 17 April.

== 1945–1974 ==
On 1 May 1945, the occupying Americans published the "Amtliches Mittleilungsblatt für Velbert" (Official Information for Velbert). On 13 June, British occupation replaced the Americans in Neviges. A local chapter of the Christian Democratic Union was founded as the Christlich-Demokratische Partei (Christian Democratic Party) on 17 September, and a local chapter of the Social Democrats followed on 6 October in Langenberg. The next day, classes resumed at the Velbert grammar school. The first meeting of the Velbert denazification committee was held on 22 June 1946, and the first local elections since the war were held on 15 September. On 27 March 1947, strikes and demonstrations in front of the Velbert town hall protesting food shortages. On 20 June 1948, Neviges lost about ℛℳ2 million to inflation in its changeover to the Deutsche Mark. On 14 August 1949, the first Bundestag member for Velbert, Langenberg and Neviges was the Christian Democrats' Gerhard Schröder, and the Velberter Zeitung and Langenberger Zeitung resumed publication on 15 October. Nine days later, Velbert's denazification committee finished its work. In February 1952 the Velbert-Neviges-Werden tram line ceased operation, leaving Velbert, Neviges and Langenberg without tram service. Several churches were dedicated: Johanniskirche in Velbert in 1954 and St. Nicholas Chapel in Langenhorst in 1955. On 4 July 1955 St. Paul's Church (designed by Dominikus Böhm) was dedicated, and the cornerstone of the Church of the Apostles (both in Velbert) was laid on 10 June 1956. Neviges' den Lebenden zur Mahnung (Reminder to the Living) memorial was inaugurated on 18 November 1956.

== 1975 to present ==
In 1975, Langenberg, Neviges and Velbert became the town of Velbert. In 1982, the Langenberg-Wuppertal road in Neviges was closed to automobile traffic. The 1985 congresses of the German Communist Party and National Democratic Party of Germany in Velbert were met with large demonstrations. Although the 1986 opening of the Velbert comprehensive school provoked protests by up to 6,000 people, the school receives many more applications than it can accept. In 1996, Velbert's Kinocenter (its last cinema) and the Laakmann paper factory in Langenberg closed; that year, Velbert's population was almost 90,000. Hanns-Friedrich Hörr was Velbert's first directly elected mayor in 1999. In 2007, the B224 north–south road became part of the A535.

== Sources ==
- Horst Degen, Christoph Schotten, Stefan Wunsch (authors), Bergischer Geschichtsverein Abteilung Velbert / Hadenberg e.V. (editor): Velbert – Geschichte dreier Städte, J.P. Bachem Verlag, Cologne, 2009, ISBN 978-3-7616-1843-1.
