= Bombing of Essen in World War II =

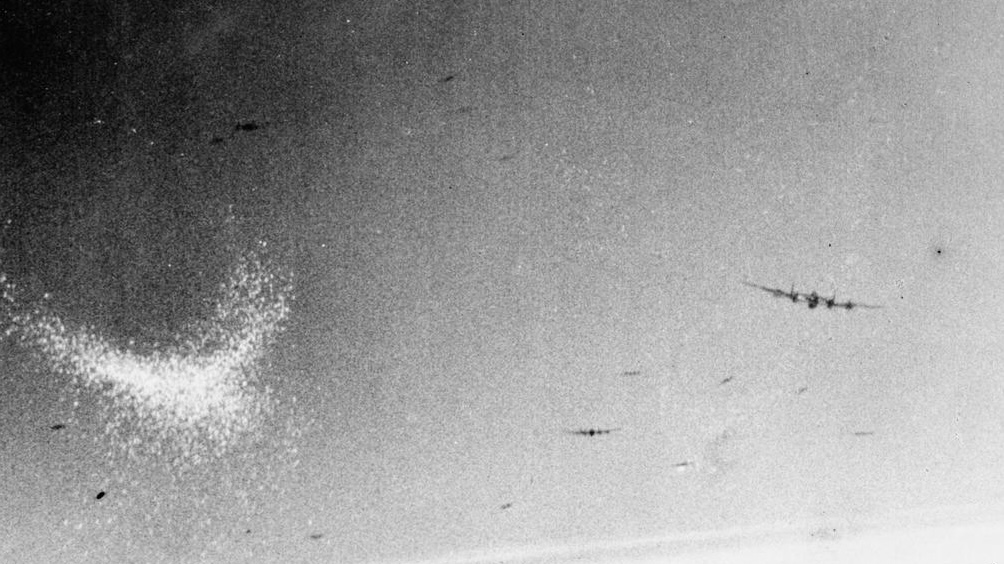
A Lancaster dropping Window (the crescent-shaped white cloud on the left of the picture) over Essen during a thousand-bomber raid

During World War II, the German industrial town of Essen was a target of Allied strategic bombing. The Krupp steelworks in particular was an important industrial target, but Essen in general was a "primary target" designated for area bombing by the February 1942 British Area bombing directive. As part of the campaign in 1943 known as the Battle of the Ruhr, Essen was a "regular target".

Large-scale night-time decoys were built, like the Krupp decoy site (Kruppsche Nachtscheinanlage) that was a copy of the Krupp steel works in Essen designed to divert Allied airstrikes from the actual production site of the arms factory.

In the period 1939 to 1945 the Royal Air Force (RAF) dropped a total of 36,429 long tons of bombs on Essen.

== Bombing ==
Essen World War II bombings
Date	Target	Notes
March 8/9, 1942		211 RAF aircraft destroy a few Essen houses and a church, 10 people killed and 19 missing.
March 9/10, 1942		187 RAF aircraft destroy 2 buildings in Essen (72 damaged) and cause damage in 24 other Ruhr towns (particularly Hamborn and Duisburg). In Essen, 10 people were killed, 19 were missing and 52 were injured. In other towns, 74 people were killed and 284 injured
March 10/11, 1942		62 crews claimed to have bombed Essen, with 2 bombs hitting on an industrial target (railway lines near the Krupp factory). 1 house was destroyed and 2 damaged in residential areas. 5 Germans were killed and 12 injured and a Polish worker was killed by a Flak shell which descended and exploded on the ground. No. 106 Squadron RAF was one of the bombing units.
March 17, 1942		1 RAF Wellington on a cloud-cover raid to Essen dropped its bombs somewhere in the Ruhr.
March 18, 19, & 21, 1942		RAF Wellingtons to Essen returned because of lack of cloud.
March 25/26, 1942		In the largest force sent to 1 target so far (254 aircraft), much of the Essen effort was drawn off by the decoy fire site at Rheinberg and 1 house was destroyed and 2 seriously damaged. 5 people were killed and 11 injured.
March 26/27, 1942		2 Essen houses destroyed, 6 people killed and 14 injured. 11 of the 115 RAF bombers were lost.
March 31/April 1, 1942		4 RAF Wellingtons, with selected crews, to Essen but only random targets were bombed by 2 aircraft. No losses.
10/11 April 1942		254 aircraft - 167 Wellingtons, 43 Hampdens, 18 Stirlings, 10 Manchesters, 8 Halifaxes, 8 Lancasters. 14 aircraft - 7 Wellingtons, 5 Hampdens, 1 Halifax, 1 Manchester - lost. Crews were given a forecast of clear weather over Essen but cloud was met instead. The bombing force became scattered and suffered heavily from the Ruhr Flak defences. Bombing was poor. Essen reports 12 houses destroyed, no serious industrial damage, 7 people killed and 30 injured. Total bombs in Essen were approximately 6 aircraft loads from the 172 aircraft claiming to have bombed there. Bomber Command's first 8,000 lb (3,600 kg) bomb was dropped during this raid by the 76 Squadron Halifax of Pilot Officer M. Renaut, whose aircraft was badly damaged by Flak. It is not known where Renaut's bomb fell.
June 1/2, 1942		The second of thousand-bomber raids on German cities: 956 RAF bombers took part.
March 2/3, 1943	Krupp	6 RAF Mosquitos to the Ruhr without loss. The aircraft which bombed Essen scored direct hits in the middle of the main Krupp factory.
March 5/6, 1943	Krupp	442 aircraft in the first raid of the Battle of the Ruhr on the night that marked RAF Bomber Command's 100,000th sortie of the war. Fourteen aircraft (4 Lancasters, 4 Wellingtons, 3 Halifaxes, 3 Stirlings) were lost: 3.2 per cent of the force. A further 56 aircraft turned back early. Three of these were Oboe-equipped Mosquito marker aircraft leaving five to mark the target. Marking was carried out 'blind', avoiding the effects of the industrial haze that usually concealed Essen. The Main Force bombed in 3 waves. Two thirds of the bomb tonnage was incendiary, the rest high-explosive. One third of the high-explosive bombs were fused for long delay. The attack lasted for 40 minutes. Reconnaissance photographs showed 160 acres (0.65 km^{2}) of destruction with buildings within the Krupp works hit by bombs.
March 10/11 1943		2 RAF Mosquitos to Essen
March 12/13, 1943		457 RAF aircraft fly a successful Oboe-marked raid. The centre of the bombing area was across the giant Krupp factory, just west of the Essen centre, with later bombing drifting back to the north-western outskirts. Going by photographic evidence, it was believed by Bomber Command that Krupp received 30 per cent more damage on this night than on 5/6 March.
25/26 July 1943		Last raid on Essen during the Battle of the Ruhr. 705 aircraft of which 3.7 percent were lost. The raid had been planned to take advantage of the recent introduction of "Window". "The Krupps works suffered what was probably its most damaging raid of the war".
December 12/13, 1943		During the RAF campaign against Berlin, Essen was attacked by 18 Mosquitos.
January 13/14, 1944		Small raids on Essen, Duisburg, Aachen, and Koblenz by 25 Mosquitos. One aircraft was lost.
26/27 March 1944		705 aircraft. German fighter defences were unprepared for the attack on Essen and only 1.3% of the bomber force is lost. Bombing was by Oboe marked through cloud and Bomber Command recorded the attack as "successful".
31 March/1 April 1944		nuisance raid by three Mosquitos
8/9 April 1944		40 Mosquitos attack Krupp works without loss
26/27 April 1944		493 bombers attack Essen in an "accurate attack". Another 226 attack Schweinfurt and 217 against Villeneuve-Saint-Georges in France.
October 8, 1944	marshalling yards	396 two- and 1,250 four-engined bombers support the American XIX Corps "battle for the Westwall" by attacking Kassel, Hamm, and Cologne marshalling yards at the edge of the battle area.
March 8, 1945	coking plant	In Essen, 114 aircraft bombed the Emil coking plant, and 109 bombed the marshalling yards.

== Bibliography ==
- Bomber Command Campaign Diary. Bomber Command 60th Anniversary. Royal Air Force. April 6, 2005. Wikidata Q131324214. Archived from the original on July 6, 2007. March 1942, July 1942, August 1942, September 1942, October 1942, November 1942, December 1942, January 1943, February 1943, March 1943, April 1943
