= Thousand-bomber raids =

British bombing raids in World War II

The term "thousand-bomber raid" was used to describe three night bombing raids by the Royal Air Force against German cities in summer 1942 during World War II. The term was a propaganda device, whereby Arthur Harris reached the number of bombers by including not only bombers that were currently operational as part of RAF Bomber Command, but also aircrews from Operational Training Units to accumulate a force of 1,000 bombers as a demonstration of the RAF's power. The bulk of the bomber force was twin-engined medium bombers like the Vickers Wellington. While the number of heavy bombers in the RAF increased, greater tonnage could be dropped on a target with fewer aircraft. Later mass RAF raids used between 400 and 700 four-engined bombers, and on some nights, Bomber Command sent two forces of 400-bomber each to separate targets. Operation Gomorrah in 1943 and the attack on Dresden in 1945 each used nearly 800 aircraft. Nearly 900 were sent to Berlin in February 1944; with aircraft on other missions that night more than 1,000 bombers were active, but 1,000 bombers were never sent against a single target after June 1942.

== Raids ==
- 30–31 May 1942 : First thousand-bomber raid, 1,047 aircraft dispatched in Operation Millennium against Cologne. This saw the first use of the "bomber stream" to overwhelm German radar and defences by flying in a narrow dense formation. Bomber Command recorded 868 bombers attacking the target with 1,455 long tons (1,478 t) of bombs. Over three thousand buildings were destroyed and another nine thousand damaged.
- 1–2 June 1942 : Second thousand-bomber raid on Essen, 956 aircraft were dispatched but the target was obscured and bombing was not effective
- 25–26 June 1942 : Third thousand-bomber raid on Bremen. Bomber Command assembled 960 aircraft including day bombers from No. 2 Group RAF to which RAF Coastal Command added 102 aircraft. The attack was on the Focke-Wulf factory, the A.G. Weser shipyard, the Deschimag shipyard, and an area attack on the town and docks. GEE radio navigation partially offset cloud cover over the target and just under 700 aircraft bombed Bremen.

== See also ==
- Strategic bombing during World War II
