= Area bombing directive =

Royal Air Force directive to bomb Nazi Germany

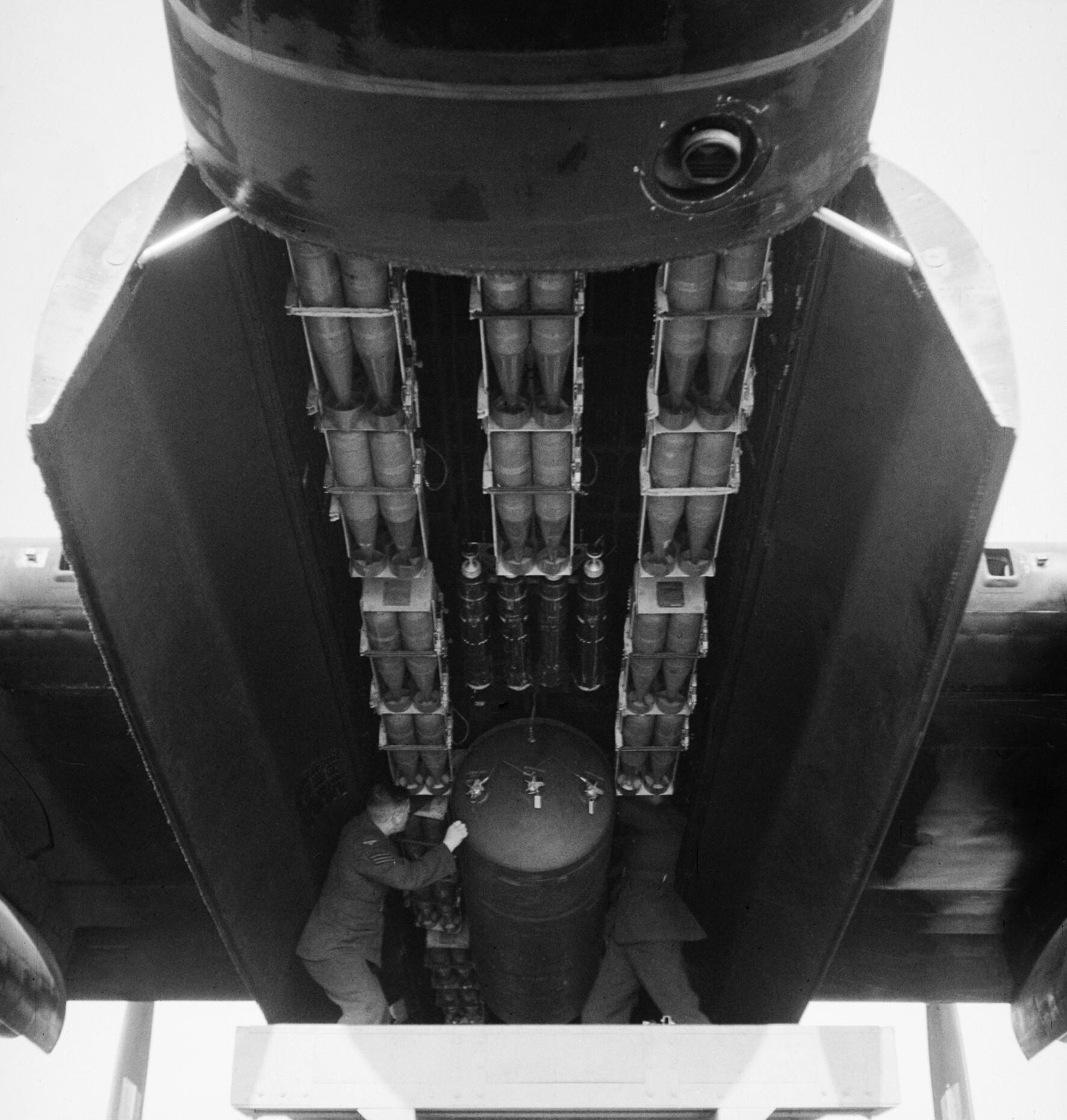
Avro Lancaster bomb bay showing "Usual" area bombardment mix of 4,000-pound "Cookie" blast bomb and 30-pound incendiary bombs before a raid on Bremen, September 1942

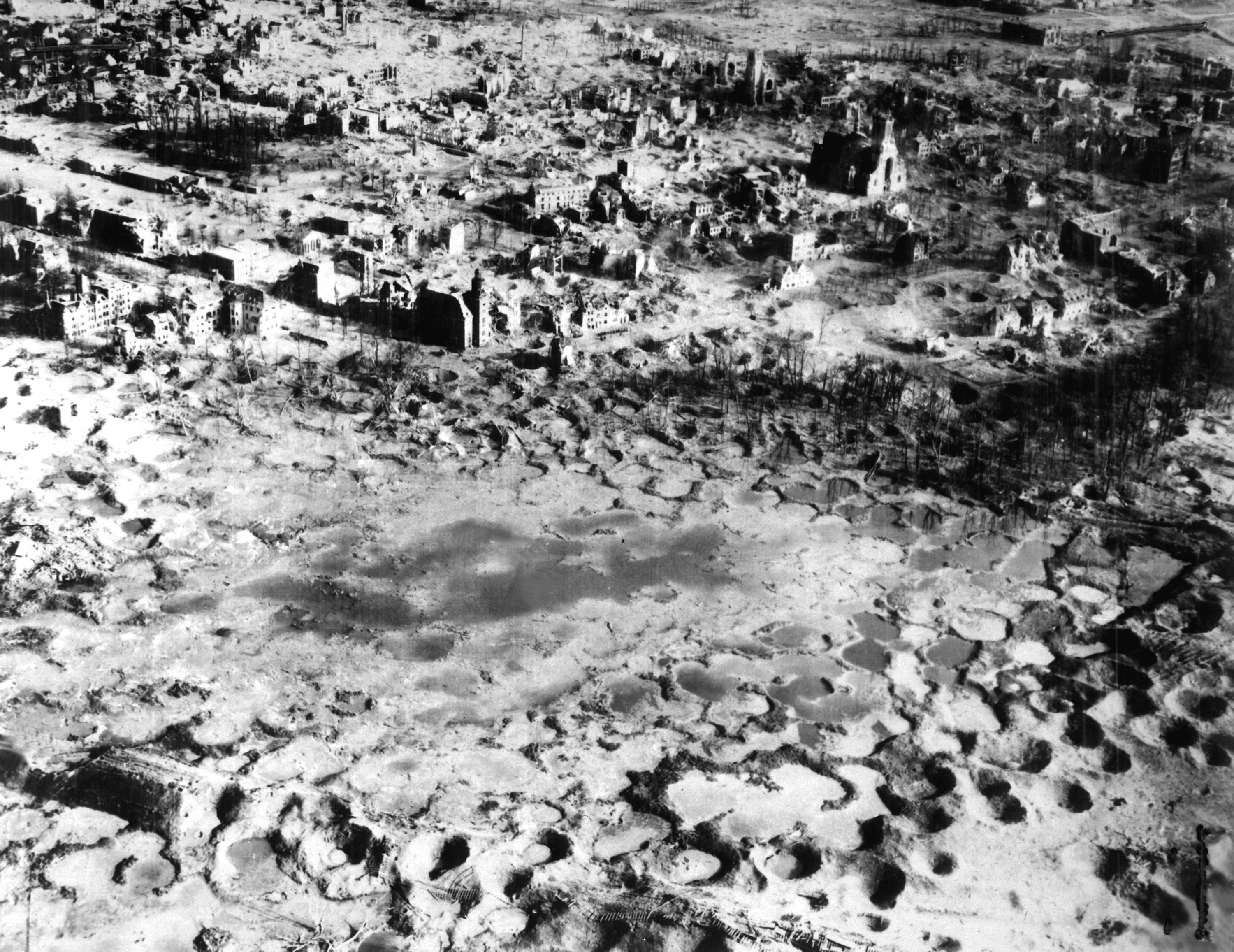
The town of Wesel was entirely destroyed by aerial bombing and artillery shelling. The bomb craters in the foreground of the image illustrate the density of the bombardement.

The Area Bombing Directive was a directive issued by the Air Ministry of the War Cabinet to the Royal Air Force (RAF) during World War II on 14 February 1942. The directive ordered RAF Bomber Command to destroy Nazi Germany's industrial workforce and demoralise the population through area bombing of Germany's cities and their civilian inhabitants.

== Background and implementation ==
The Area Bombing Directive General Directive No.5 (S.46368/111. D.C.A.S) was a 14 February 1942 amendment to General Directive No.4 (S.46368 D.C.A.S), issued by the British Air Ministry on 5 February 1942, that instructed RAF Bomber Command that it had "Priority over all other commitments", and directed RAF Bomber Command to bomb factories in occupied France. General Directive Number 5 amended Number 4, to make targets in Germany the priority for RAF Bomber Command.

The directive issued on 14 February (S.46368/111. D.C.A.S) listed the primary industrial areas that were within 350 miles of RAF Mildenhall, that distance being a little over the maximum range of the GEE radio navigation aid (referred to in the directive as "T.R. 1335"). The directive specifically mentions the Ruhr and that Essen, in the centre of the conurbation, was to be given the dubious honour as the first target that was to be bombed (the first attack on Essen under this directive was carried out on the night of 8/9 March). The objective of the directive was "To focus attacks on the morale of the enemy civil population and in particular the industrial workers. In the case of Berlin harassing attacks to maintain fear of raids and to impose A. R. P. measures".

The directive issued on 14 February listed the industrial areas on Germany's northern coast (within range of GEE) and industrial areas beyond the operational reach of GEE (Berlin by name and northern central and southern Germany) as secondary targets to be bombed when the weather over those targets was more suitable for bombing than over the primary area. Other German cities mentioned by name and to be attacked with high explosives were Duisburg, Düsseldorf and Cologne. Billancourt in occupied France, which was the primary target in the directive issued on 5 February (Air Ministry Reference 46268 D.C.A.S) and immediately preceding this one, was to become the secondary target (it was bombed on the night of 3/4 March). In addition, the RAF was also directed to conduct specific operations to support Combined Operations, such as the periodic bombardment of targets of immediate strategic importance, for example naval units (see Channel Dash that happened only two days before this directive was issued), but it added a qualifier that these were only to be carried out if good opportunities to attack primary targets were not missed.

The directive issued on 14 February also stated that "You are accordingly authorised to employ your forces without restriction" which lifted the injunction placed on Bomber Command on 13 November 1941 ordering it to conserve its forces after the very heavy mauling it had suffered at the hands of Luftwaffe night fighters earlier that month.

On 15 February, the day after the directive was issued, the Chief of the Air Staff Charles Portal sought clarification from the Deputy Chief of Air Staff Air Vice Marshal Norman Bottomley who had drafted it:

ref the new bombing directive: I suppose it is clear the aiming points will be the built up areas, and not, for instance, the dockyards or aircraft factories where these are mentioned in Appendix A. This must be made quite clear if it is not already understood.

The first major target attacked in the campaign initiated by the directive was Essen on the night of 8/9 March 1942. This was followed by repeated incendiary attacks on Essen and the other three large cities in the Ruhr, and then "as opportunity offered, fourteen other industrial cities in Northern, Central and Southern Germany".

Between 21 March and 3 September 1942, eight further modifications were made to the directive (all under the same Air Ministry reference, but modified file references). These were:

- 21 March: Attack the Ruhr using concentrated incendiary attacks ("such as the enemy had made on us to good effect"). It was in part to be experimental with different sizes of incendiary devices to be used to assess their effectiveness.
- 16 April: Support Special Operations Executive (SOE) operations.
- 18 April: Daylight bombing of Le Creusot Works
- 18 April: Bomb the Pilsen (Skoda) Works on the night of 23/24 April. "To cover highly organised extensive sabotage attacks against German lines of communications with Russian Front, and to boost Czech morale while increasing R.A.F. prestige at the expense of German propaganda".
- 5 May: Change the secondary targets and objectives laid out in the initial directive. The changes directed the RAF to bomb Bremen, Kassel, Frankfurt, and Stuttgart "to reduce the output of enemy aircraft, especially fighters, to assist Russia and projected Combined Operations".
- 25 May: Added as targets industrial plant used by the Germans in all occupied countries (previously the directive had only covered plant in France).
- 16 June: A further modification to the original directive on 5 February replacing the old French targets (now destroyed or severely damaged) with some new ones, but emphasised that the targets in the list should only be bombed by experienced crews and only if weather conditions did not make it likely that for political reasons stray bombs would fall on adjacent properties.
- 3 September: the synthetic oil plant at Pölitz was added to the list of targets because the British believed it to be the largest in the world and supplying a large part of the German requirements for their offensive on the Eastern Front.

The operations of the RAF were also modified by other directives issued by the Air Ministry while Directive S.46368 was still effective. For example, on 30 July 1942 (S.3319 A.C.A.S. Ops) gave priority to "Transportation and Transformer Stations" for Number 2 Group and S.O.E. squadron. while on 4 September (S.46344 A.C.A.S. Ops) directed that incendiary bombs were to be "dropped in harvest season during normal bombing operations" as cover for sabotage operations. On 14 January 1943 directive (S.46239/?? A.C.A.S. Ops) gave priority to attacking U-boat pens of Lorient, St Nazaire, Brest and La Pallice on the western French coast. In line with the bombing of Genoa and Turin on 23 October 1942 and a speech by the British Prime Minister Winston Churchill six days later, warning the Italian government that the RAF would continue bombing Italian cities while Italy remained an Axis power, a directive was issued on 17 January 1943 (S.46368/??? D.C.A.S. Ops) added to the bombing list of targets the Industrial centres of Northern Italy – Milan, Turin, Genoa and Spezia.

The Area Bombing Directive was superseded by the Casablanca directive (C.S. 16536 S.46368 A.C.A.S. Ops). It was approved by the Combined Chiefs of Staff at their 65th meeting on 21 January 1943 and issued by the British and United States Army Air Force Commanders on 4 February 1943.

== See also ==
- Aerial bombardment and international law § International law up to 1945
- Dehousing paper – British Cabinet paper on the policy
- AF Bomber Command § Strategic bombing 1942–45)
- Strategic bombing during World War II
