= Krupp decoy site =

WWII decoy steelworks in Essen, Germany

Coordinates: 51.365°N 7.070°E

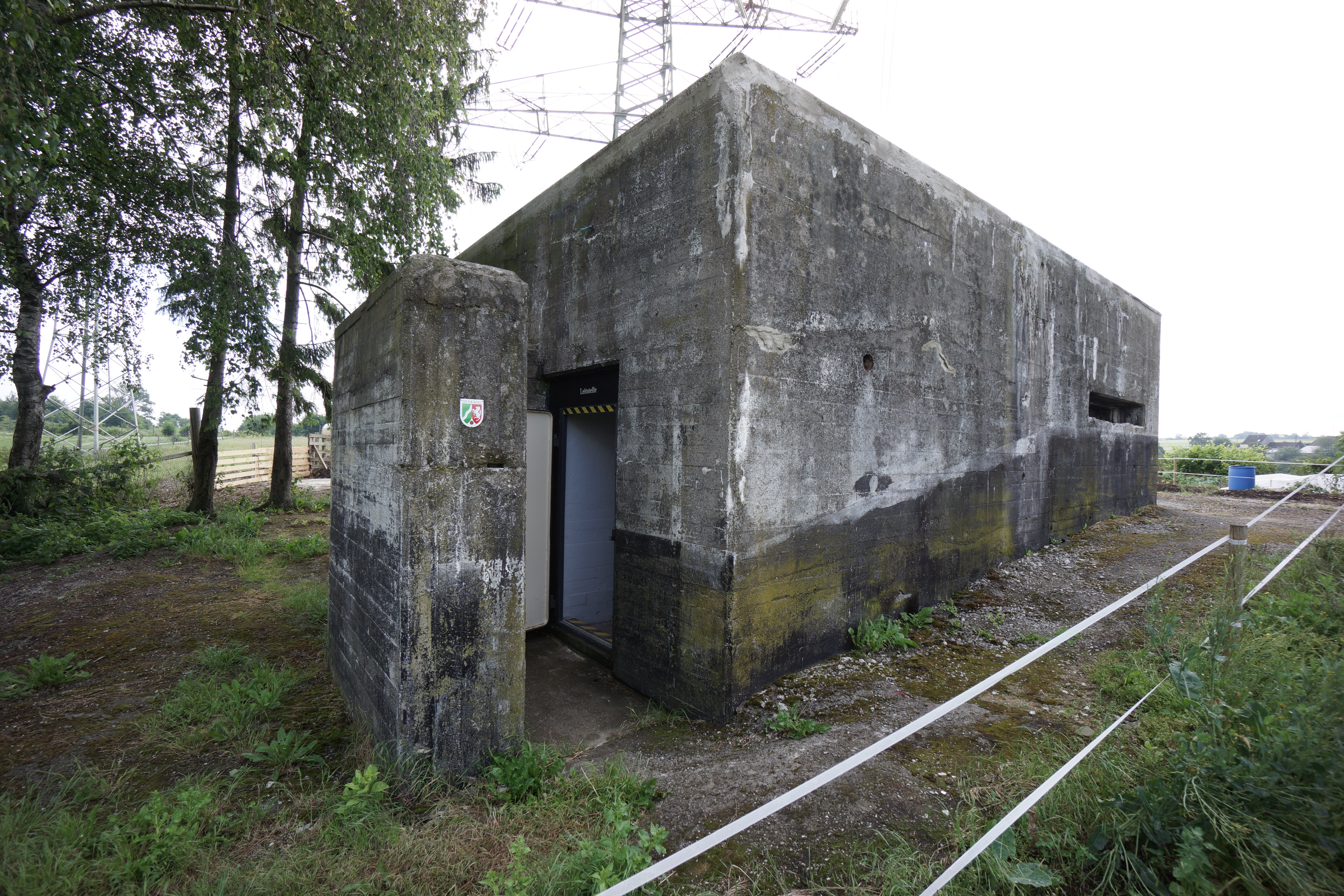
Control-bunker of Kruppsche Nachtscheinanlage

The Krupp night decoy site Kruppsche Nachtscheinanlage was a German decoy-site of the Krupp steelworks in Essen. It was designed to divert Allied night airstrikes in the bombing of Essen in World War II from the actual production site of the arms factory.

== Description ==
The decoy factory was 10 kilometres (6.2 mi) from the real factory, situated on the Rottberg-Hills in Velbert. It occupied an area of 1.5 km (1 mile) × 2.5 km (1½ miles).

The dummy factory was supposed to mimic a poorly darkened and operating Krupp steel works as the Royal Air Force only flew at night. The decoy system consisted of a large number of very rudimentary dummy installations of industrial building and structures. Among them were shed roofs, a gasometer, chimneys, a railroad, and elaborate light arrays and fires, controlled from a nearby bunker.

== Efficiency ==
RAF Bomber Command did not correctly identify the decoy installation until 1943, by which time its bombers had dropped 64 percent of all high-explosive bombs and 75 percent of all incendiaries on the decoy rather than the real site.

== Today's condition ==
Today, only the control bunker of the decoy site is preserved. After systematic research and documentation by volunteers of the Landschaftsverband Rheinland (LVR) – Office for Archeological Monument Protection, it was listed as a historical monument in 2013.

== Museum development ==
The bunker is located on private property. Visits are offered on the European Heritage Days, historical walks or the Long Night of Museums.
