= Confirmation and overclaiming of aerial victories during World War II =

This article explores confirmation and overclaiming of aerial victories during World War II. In aerial warfare, the term overclaiming describes a combatant (or group) that claims the destruction of more enemy aircraft than actually achieved. The net effect is that the actual losses and claimed victories are unequal, and that the claiming side is inaccurately reporting their combat achievements, thereby potentially undermining their credibility to all parties participating and observing the war.

In order to reduce risk of overclaiming, various militaries participating in World War II developed methods and procedures for confirmation of claimed aerial victories in an attempt to more reliably report actual losses.

== Terminology ==
=== Victories, kills, and aces ===
There are disagreements over the terminology to be used in assessing "aerial victories". Former Canadian Armed Forces pilot and Wings editor Wayne Ralph (2008) cautioned that the term "flying ace", emerging during the First World War, 'was first coined by the French in 1915. There are no governing international bodies controlling the label or screening entry into the club. The enemy you fight does not have to die for you to be credited with a victory. Therefore the expression "kills" used when discussing aces is misleading. It is confirmed victories, not deaths in air combat that produces aces'. Ralph argued that 'books about aces create mythologies of good, better and best, portraying air-to-air combat as a kind of international sporting event where bronze, silver and gold medals are awarded based on scores. Any conclusions drawn from such simplistic rankings are meaningless'.

Mike Spick (1996/2011) stated: 'Fighter pilots differ from most other warriors in that there is a practical, as opposed to subjective, yardstick by which their deeds can be measured. This is the number of aerial victories they score. To pre-empt comments about overclaiming, the author wishes to stress that a victory is not necessarily a kill: it is a combat in which an enemy aircraft appears to be hit, and goes down in such a manner as to make the successful pilot believe that it is a total loss'.

=== Other terms ===
- Forced to land (FTL): the enemy aircraft had to land in either allied or enemy territory. During World War I in 1915 and 1916, the British military could award victories for FTL but for enemy territory cases, it was evidently difficult to confirm whether it was really "forced to land" due to the British flyers' actions or for other reasons. Even if in allied territory, capture of the aircraft and/or its crew was not required either, which also compromised verification and thus accuracy.
  - Fallen in captivity: the enemy aircraft had to land in allied territory and be captured by allied ground or naval forces.
- Out of control (OOC): the enemy aircraft was allegedly out of the pilot's control, but it was not observed to hit the ground. This designation was vulnerable to misperception, and impossible to confirm due to a lack of visual evidence of a crash site.
- Driven down
- Falling in flames
- Crashed to earth
- Disintegrated in flight
- Pilot bailed: the enemy pilot was observed using his parachute. This was one of the better forms of evidence to confirm an enemy pilot had lost control of the aircraft or could no longer safely escape with it. While bailed pilots could stand a high chance of survival (depending on circumstances) and thus not be counted as a "kill", the aircraft was unlikely to be salvaged, and opposing force is generally credited with an aerial victory in such a scenario.

== Causes of overclaiming and efforts at confirmation ==
Overclaiming by individuals can occur:

- when more than one person attacked the same target and each claimed its destruction afterwards;
- when an aircraft appeared to be no longer in a flying condition, but managed to recover on a lower altitude without crashing, and landing safely;
- when an individual simply wished to claim unjustified credit for downing an opponent, based on poor eyewitness testimony of thinking having seen it go down in a split second, but being unable to verify it in the heat of the moment.

In some instances of combat over friendly territory a damaged aircraft may have been claimed as an aerial victory by its opponent, while the aircraft was later salvaged and restored to an operational status. In this situation the loss may not appear in the records while the claim remains confirmed.

Separate from problems with confirmation, overclaiming can also occur for political or propaganda reasons, to stimulate morale amongst the troops or at the home front, or to attempt to undermine the enemy's morale. It was common for both sides to inflate figures for "kills" or deflate figures for losses in broadcasts and news reports. There were also issues of competition and rivalry between individual pilots, as well as aircrew teams or units, where a higher score of aerial victories increased social prestige, and could lead to both official and informal military and civilian decorations, awards and honours, which added pressure to inflate claims, and contributed to overclaiming.

== Procedures for crediting aerial victories ==
Ralph (2008) noted: 'In the First World War, the Second World War and also the Korean War, overclaiming was common; it varied by theatre, nation and individual, but it was inevitable.' 'Comparing aces, within or between nations, based solely on their victory scores is an absurd exercise, and does a great disservice to all fighter pilots. (...) [T]he standard of due diligence in crediting victories to individual pilots varies according to the country, the war being fought, how well or badly the war is going, the doctrine of the opposing air forces, and the leaders in command of individual fighter squadrons and flights. Many other variables affect these alleged rankings. The process of crediting victories is not immune to subjective concerns such as ambition, both individual and institutional, and exaggeration, either deliberate or inadvertent. Aerial combat is almost always confusing. The oft-used term "fog of war" applies equally to air war.'

=== American battle damage assessment procedure for enemy aircraft ===
In the 1945 U.S. report Statistical summary of Eighth Air Force operations: European theater, 17 Aug. 1942 – 8 May 1945, the following definitions were applied:

Destroyed: A. Enemy aircraft in flight shall be considered destroyed when:

1. Seen to crash.
2. Seen to disintegrate in the air or to be enveloped in flames.
3. Seen to descend on friendly territory and be captured.
4. Pilot and entire crew seen to bail out.

=== German recognition procedure for aerial victories ===
The Luftwaffe's aerial victory recognition procedure was based on directive 55270/41 named "Recognition of aerial victories, destructions and sinking of ships" (German: Anerkennung von Abschüssen, Zerstörungen und Schiffsvernichtung) and was issued by the Oberbefehlshaber der Luftwaffe (Luftwaffe high command). The directive was first issued in 1939 and was revised several times.

In theory, the German approval process for the confirmation of aerial victories was very stringent and required a witness. The final destruction or explosion of an enemy aircraft in the air, or bail-out of the pilot from the aircraft, had to be observed on gun-camera film or by at least one other human witness. The witness could be the German pilot's wingman, another in the squadron, or an observer on the ground. If a pilot reported shooting down an aircraft without this confirmation it was considered only a "probable" and did not count in the victory scoring process.

During the 1990s, German archives were made available to the public in the form of microfilm rolls of wartime records, which had not been seen since January 1945. The records show that, although the Luftwaffe generally did not accept a "kill" without a witness, some pilots habitually submitted unwitnessed claims and sometimes these made it through the verification process, particularly if they were made by pilots with established records. Unlike all of the other air forces that fought during World War II, the Luftwaffe did not accept shared claims, but sometimes it happened. Each claim should have referred to a particular aircraft, but some victories were awarded to other pilots who had claimed the destruction of the same aircraft. From mid-year 1943 through 1944, the Wehrmachtbericht (communiqués from the head of the armed forces) often overstated Allied bomber losses by a factor of up to two; these claims existed only in the communiqués and were not used in victory scoring. Defenders of the German fighter pilots maintain that overclaims were eliminated during the confirmation process, but the microfilms show that this was not always the case. A stringent review of German archives shows that 90 percent of the claims submitted to the RLM were "confirmed", or found to be "in order for confirmation", up to the time the system broke down in 1945.

=== Military leadership and intelligence ===
Overclaiming during World War II has been the centre of much scrutiny, partly because of the significant amount of air combat relative to other conflicts. Leadership often recognised overclaiming in World War II, even for non-aerial victories, and a process of dividing figures by 2 was often observed to come to a closer understanding of the reality of the claims. Overclaiming as a whole was very common in World War II, against aerial, naval or ground targets. A good and commonly observed method of cross-examining claims is to corroborate them with the recorded losses by the other side, where overclaiming is often contrasted strongly against real losses.

When questioned after the end of the war on the success of Rabaul's emergent interception tactics against Allied high-level bombing raids, Rear Adm. Sumikawa responded that the "claims of his (Sumikawa's) pilots, as well as ours are absurd and not worth considering".

=== American and Japanese overclaiming in the Pacific ===
Barrett Tillman (2014) noted that U.S. and Japanese claims of aerial victories in the Pacific theatre were often far removed from reality. 'From the first dedicate fighter sweep on 17 December, [1943] through the month's end, IJN [Imperial Japanese Navy] records 25 Zero losses among 492 sorties, whereas US Marine Corps squadrons alone claimed 79 victories. US Navy pilots added nine more, so excluding USAAF and RNZAF claims, the naval squadrons reckoned 3.5 victories for every actual Japanese loss.' He went on to argue: 'If the Americans were often excessive in their victory claims, the Japanese dealt in fantasy. Frequently, Rabaul's fighter pilots claimed 50 victories in a day, the record being 28 January 1943 when the claimed 79 kills, plus probables. American records indicate five airplanes were missing and one fatally damaged on that date. The remarkable thing is that the Japanese believed their own figures, despite the fact that as [sic] no successful Solomons air campaign could have sustained such grievous losses.'

=== British overclaiming in the Battle of Britain ===
In World War II, overclaims were a common problem. Nearly 50 percent of Royal Air Force (RAF) victories in the Battle of Britain do not tally with recorded German losses. Some of this apparent overclaiming can be tallied with known wrecks and German aircrew known to have been in British prisoner of war camps.

== Examples of overclaiming ==
Date	Claiming Air Force (unit)	Notes
10 July 1940	Luftwaffe	III./ZG 26 claimed 12 Hawker Hurricanes. The RAF recorded one lost Hurricane in a collision with a Dornier Do 17
13 July 1940	Royal Air Force	No. 56 Squadron RAF claimed seven Junkers Ju 87 "Stuka"s from Sturzkampfgeschwader 1 destroyed over Isle of Portland. StG 1 recorded the loss of only two Ju 87s shot down.
12 August 1940	Luftwaffe	The Germans claimed 22 British aircraft destroyed, actual British losses were 3. In one engagement Bf 109s from JG 2 claimed six RAF fighters, while bombers from KG 54 claimed 14. Only one fighter was shot down and six damaged.
18 August 1940	Luftwaffe; Royal Air Force	The Germans claimed 147 aircraft destroyed, recorded British losses were 68, the British claimed 144 aircraft destroyed, recorded German losses were 69. By coincidence each side had overclaimed the other's losses by 50%.
15 September 1940	Royal Air Force	On the day termed as the "Battle of Britain Day", the RAF claimed 185 German aircraft shot down. German recorded losses were 60.
1940	Luftwaffe; Royal Air Force	In total, the Germans claimed they shot down approximately 3,600 aircraft, nearly twice as many as the British lost. RAF Fighter Command reported that they shot down 2,692 German aircraft in the Battle of Britain, nearly twice as many as the Germans lost, including losses from flak and accidents.
June 1941 – December 1941	Soviet Air Force	The Soviets of the South-Western Front claimed 85 Bf 109s. A further 53 were claimed by anti-aircraft units in October and another 54 in November. Only 31 Bf 109s were recorded as lost by the Luftwaffe in this period. VVS claims on the Eastern Front amount to 3,879, anti-aircraft units claimed 752, and a further 3,257 were claimed destroyed on the ground. The Luftwaffe reported the loss of 3,827 aircraft to all causes on the Eastern Front in 1941. The VVS overclaimed by more than 100%.
June 1941 – December 1941	Royal Air Force	During this period RAF Fighter Command launched a sustained 'fighter offensive' over Northern Europe, designed to tie down Luftwaffe fighter units, and hence indirectly take pressure off the Eastern Front, and to hopefully draw those Luftwaffe units encountered into a war of attrition. Fighting exclusively over enemy territory, and thus usually unable to accurately verify their pilot's combat reports, Fighter Command claimed 711 Luftwaffe fighters shot down, while losing 411 of its own fighters. The loss to JG 2 and JG 26, the principal opponents, were reportedly just 103 fighters.
6 April 1942	Soviet Air Force	A Red Air Force unit claimed seven Finnish Brewster Buffalos shot down in a single action over Tiiksjärvi-Rukajärvi area and four destroyed on the ground. Not a single Finnish aircraft was confirmed by Finnish records. Soviet pilot V. I. Solomatin claimed to have shot down five Brewster fighters and was later honoured with Hero of the Soviet Union. Finns claimed to have shot down 2 bombers and 12 fighters; actual USSR air losses were 1 bomber and 6 fighters. One of the fighters was shot down by anti-aircraft artillery and one by both AA and FiAF fighter pilot. So FiAF pilots shot down one SB bomber and 4 1/2 Hurricane fighters.
7 May 1942	United States Navy, Task Force 17	During Task Force 17's carrier attack on the MO operation close support force in the Battle of the Coral Sea, American fighter and bomber pilots claimed 'five enemy fighters and one 'VSB' type' and five fighters and one 'VSB' type, respectively, for a total of 12 planes claimed shot down. Actual Japanese losses were two Type 96 fighters and one Type 0 fighter, for a total of three.
8 June 1942	Soviet Air Force	6 GIAP/VVS ChF claimed nine German aircraft shot down in a single action. Not a single German aircraft of any type was recorded as lost.
4 June 1942	Japanese Imperial Navy	In the Battle of Midway Japanese Mitsubishi A6M "Zero" pilots claimed more than 40 American fighters shot down and several probably destroyed. The U.S. Marine Corps squadron, VMF-221, had sent up 25 Brewster Buffalos and Grumman F4F Wildcats, losing 15.
8 July 1942	Finnish Air Forces	24th Fighter Squadron claimed that they had inflicted on Soviet Baltic Fleet the following: 1 Pe-2 bomber, 3 Spitfire fighters and 1 Il-2 aircraft. The VVS KBF suffered in air combat just 2 losses: 2 Yak-1 fighters shot down by FiAF pilots. Pe-2 bomber and Il-2 were shot down by Navy vessels.
20 July 1942 – 10 August 1942	Luftwaffe	During this period, Fliegerkorps VIII claimed to have shot down 606 Soviet aircraft while destroying another 107 on the ground. Actual losses of 8 VA were 230 aircraft – 114 fighters, 70 Shturmoviks, 29 Pe-2s, four Su-2s and 13 night bombers.
26 July 1942	Soviet Air Force: 434 IAP and 512 IAP	These units claimed 18 and 12 kills against Macchi C.200s of the Italian 21 Gruppo Autonomo C.T. during Fall Blau. The Italian unit lost three Macchis.
18 August 1942	Finnish Air Forces	24th Fighter Squadron claimed that they had inflicted on Soviet Baltic Fleet the following: 2 Pe-2, 1 Hurricane and 13 I-16 aircraft shot down. The VVS KBF suffered six losses: four I-16 fighters and two Pe-2 bombers. Baltic Fleet claimed four "Capron" and three Bf 109. Actually FiAF lost just one Brewster fighter
15 September 1942	Luftwaffe; Desert Air Force (Royal Air Force; Royal Australian Air Force and South African Airforce)	Jagdgeschwader 27 claimed 19 aerial victories, while RAAF the South African Airforce (SAAF) and the RAF records report the loss of five aircraft (a further Allied fighter was lost to friendly ground fire). The Allies claimed two destroyed, two probables, and three damaged in the same engagement. The Germans lost Lt. Hoffmann of I. Gruppe and Uffz. Prien to a midair collision, killing Prien. No further losses had been reported.
9 October 1942	United States Army Air Forces	The USAAF claimed that they had inflicted on the Luftwaffe the following: 56 kills, 26 probable kills, and 20 aircraft severely damaged. President Franklin Delano Roosevelt reported these numbers to the American public in a nationwide broadcast. In fact, the Luftwaffe suffered one loss.
15 December 1942	Imperial Japanese Army Air Forces	Burma: 50th Sentai pilots submitted claims for six Hawker Hurricanes shot down over Chittagong. Not one Hurricane was even damaged.
25 December 1942	United States Army Air Forces	Burma: 16th Fighter Squadron, 23rd Fighter Group pilots submitted claims for ten enemy aircraft shot down, five probable, and one damaged. The 64th Sentai lost one Ki-43 and three Ki-48s from 8th Sentai were damaged.
2 March 1943	RAF No. 54 Squadron; RAAF No. 457 Squadron; Imperial Japanese Navy Air Service 202nd Kōkūtai	Each side claimed three enemy aircraft destroyed. Neither side suffered any losses.
17 April 1943	United States Army Air Forces	During a mission against the Focke-Wulf plant near Bremen, the USAAF's 91st and 306th Bomb Groups claimed 63 German fighters destroyed, 15 probable destructions, and 17 damaged. Only two were confirmed destroyed, with nine damaged. Therefore, the USAAF overstated their victories by more than 750 percent.
18 April 1943	United States Army Air Forces	During the Operation Vengeance mission to kill Admiral Isoroku Yamamoto, the 339th Fighter Squadron claimed to have shot down three twin-engined Betty bombers and two Zero fighters. In fact, the Japanese lost two bombers, and no fighters.
4 July 1943	Luftwaffe III./JG 5 Soviet Union 7. VA	The Soviet Union sent three DB-3f, two Hampdens (nine BAP), and two Il-2 (46 ShAP VVS SF) attacking a German convoy near Kirkenes. In the following air combat, the 7./JG 5 and 8./JG 5 Luftwaffe pilots claimed seven Hampdens, six Pe-2s, five Il-2s, and two Boston bombers. Soviet records show that six aircraft were shot down: one DB-3, two Hampdens, two Il-2, and one Pe-2 of 118 RAP VVS SF.
5 July 1943 – 8 July 1943	Soviet Air Force: 2. VA and 16. VA	During the Battle of Kursk, the Soviet 2. VA unit claimed 487 aircraft from Fliegerkorps VIII were shot down. German records show 41 losses. According to the Generalquartiermeister der Luftwaffe, 58 aircraft were lost to all causes, including those from flak and accidents. The 16. VA unit claimed 391 against Luftflotte 6. German records show 39 losses. The Soviet Union claimed that they destroyed a total of 878 German aircraft; this is significantly more airplanes than the Luftwaffe had in the air. Luftwaffe records show that there were 97 losses from all causes, including those from flak and accidents. Losses due to Soviet fighter pilots were 80. The Soviet Union overclaimed by more than 750 percent.
17 August 1943	United States Army Air Forces; Luftwaffe	After the Schweinfurt-Regensburg mission, the USAAF stated that they shot down 309 German fighters, broken-down as follows: gunners on the bombers claimed 288, Spitfire pilots claimed 7, and P-47 pilots claimed 14. Luftwaffe records show 40 aircraft lost. The United States overclaimed their victories by more than 650 percent. The Luftwaffe claimed that they shot down 101 bombers and 5 fighters shot down. USAAF records show that 60 B-17s and no fighters were lost but that between 58 and 95 bombers were damaged.
14 October 1943	United States Army Air Forces; Luftwaffe	After the Second Raid on Schweinfurt, USAAF gunners aboard the B-17 bombers claimed to have shot down 138 German fighters. German records show that 38 were lost and 20 were damaged. German fighter pilots claimed they shot down 121 bombers and 1 fighter. USAAF records show that 60 bombers and 1 fighter were lost, 17 bombers were scrapped, and 121 bombers were damaged.
23–25 October 1943	U.S. Southwest Pacific Air Forces	Between these days, during daylight raids on Japan's air bases at Rabaul, US SW Pacific Forces reported no less than 175 Japanese aircraft destroyed in three daylight raids between October 23 to October 25, General Kenney (in charge of SWPA) later raised this to 181 in his memoirs, in reality, the Japanese lost only 9 aircraft shot down, 25 destroyed on the ground and 27 damaged.
29 October 1943	U.S. Southwest Pacific Air Forces	During a raid on the Japanese air base in Vunakanau, Rabaul, SWPA claimed 45 Japanese aircraft shot down and destroyed. Japanese records show 7 aircraft being shot down and 3 destroyed on the ground.
2 November 1943	U.S. Southwest Pacific Air Forces V Air Force, Imperial Japanese Navy Air Service Rabaul base	During a sizeable raid on Rabaul, the 5th Air Force claimed "85 planes definitely destroyed and 23 probables" and that in 12 minutes "the air attack destroyed or damaged 114,000 tons of shipping", the Japanese had lost 20 planes destroyed in total, and two small merchant ships totaling 4600 tons and a small 500 ton minesweeper were sunk. The Japanese also claimed 22 bombers and 79 fighters shot down, though the raid force suffered a total of 19 losses (9 bombers and 10 fighters).
6 November 1943	Luftwaffe	The Soviet army pushed the retreating German army to the west of Kiev. The Luftwaffe attempted to hold the line. Yak fighters of 256 iad were ordered to patrol to the west of Kiev. Erich Rudorffer of II./JG 54 claimed that he shot down 13 fighters and his wingman, Tangermann claimed 5 near Kiev. Soviet data suggests that they lost 5 Yak fighters, 1 of which was shot down by AA fire, and that a Yak-1 of l-t Khalatjan was slightly damaged on c/m and bellylanded in friendly territory. However, the Soviet Union habitually, and to a high degree, overstated their victories and understated their losses throughout WWII.
January 1944	US Marine Corps; US Navy	'Available Japanese figures for January 1944 look like 73 Zero losses versus 302 US Marine Corps claims (59 on the 23rd alone) and 91 by the US Navy. (...) the Americans were overclaiming at a rate of more than five-to-one.'
6 January 1944	United States Army Air Forces	The United States claimed that they destroyed 241 German fighters, broken-down as follows: bomber crews claimed 210 and their fighter escort claimed 31. German records show they lost 39 fighters. The USAAF overclaimed by more than 500 percent.
3 March 1944	United States Army Air Forces; Luftwaffe	On a bombing mission to Berlin the Eighth Air Force dispatched the 1st and 2nd Air Divisions, comprising the 95th, 100th, and 390th Bomb Groups. The USAAF claimed they shot down 179 Luftwaffe fighters, broken-down as follows: B-17 gunners claimed 97 and their fighter escort claimed 82. German records show that 66 fighters were lost. The Luftwaffe claimed that they shot down 108 bombers and 20 fighters. USAAF losses were 69 bombers and 11 fighters.
? April 1944	United States Army Air Forces vs RAF	An unusual incident involving friendly fire occurred during the Burma campaign when the crew of a US B-25 fired at two approaching aircraft and later claimed to have shot down two Japanese fighters. The fighters were RAF Spitfires, one of which was piloted by New Zealand ace Alan Peart who was recorded by a ground radio unit saying, "Keep clear. The bastards are shooting at us." Both Spitfires returned safely to base, without damage.
14 June 1944	United States Army Air Forces	During the Oil Campaign of World War II, 15 P-38 Lightning escorts from 49th Squadron, 14 Fighter Group were engaged by 32 Bf 109G-6s from the 101. Honi Légvédelmi Vadászrepülő Osztály, Royal Hungarian Air Force over central Hungary. American fighter pilots claimed 19 victories: 13 Bf 109s destroyed, 1 probable destruction, and 5 damaged. The Hungarians suffered 2 losses: 1 Bf 109G was destroyed in air combat and 1 Bf 109G was destroyed in a forced landing as a result of air combat. The USAAF overclaimed by 850 percent.
9–15 June 1944	Finnish Air Forces	Fighter pilots of FiAF claimed they had inflicted on Soviet VVS and PVO losses of 56 aircraft including 27 fighters at the Karelian Isthmus. VVS and PVO actually lost 8 aircraft shot in air combat: 4 bombers, 3 Il-2s and 1 Yak-9 fighter. Twenty aircraft were shot down by anti-aircraft artillery: 3 bombers, 14 Il-2s, 2 La-5 fighters and 1 Yak-9 fighter. One Tu-2 bomber, three Il-2s, two La-5 and two Airacobra fighters were missing in action. Two badly damaged Il-4 bombers were later written off Archives of 275 Fighter Division of VVS confirmed that two La-5s MIA were actually shot down in air combat (14 June, one pilot died, other wounded) while two Airacobras MIA were lost in collision (15 June, both pilots died). So FiAF shot down in air combat 10-14 aircraft, including 3 fighter aircraft. FiAF claimed 9 times more Soviet fighters than VVS and PVO actually lost in air combat. During this 7-day period VVS KBF, Baltic Fleet, reported to have lost one Il-2 shot down (15 June), three Il-2s damaged (14 June) by anti-aircraft artillery and one Pe-2 force landing (10 June, reason unknown).
17 June 1944	Luftwaffe III./JG 5	Pilots of III./JG5, Dörr and Norz claimed both 12 Soviet aircraft. Soviet data checked by Rune Rautio and Yuri Rybin indicated that no Soviet aircraft were lost in that action. Most 7 VA aircraft had been deployed further south against Finnish forces in Svir-Petrozavodsk Offensive.
18 June 1944	Luftwaffe	The Luftwaffe claimed 39 B-24s and 5 P-51s shot down over Schleswig-Holstein. A total of 13 B-24s and 2 P-51s were lost.
10 June to 1 August 1944	Soviet Air Force	A Red Air Force unit from the 324th fighter division with 3 Regiments(195 IAP, 197 IAP and 760 IAP) claimed 39 Finnish Curtiss, 18 Brewster, 6 Morane and 1 Bf 109 shot down during Svir-Petrozavodsk Offensive. Finnish records show just 4 Morane and 2 Brewster shot down by Soviet aircraft. Three Morane and three Curtiss were shot down by anti-aircraft artillery. Soviet 324th fighter division with 3 regiments was not the only Soviet fighter unit there operating north from Lake Ladoga. Other units were 415 IAP and 773 IAP.
4 July 1944	Luftwaffe III./JG 5	Pilots of III./JG 5 claimed they shot down 26 Soviet aircraft. Soviet data checked by Rune Rautio and Yuri Rybin indicated that two Soviet aircraft were lost. Most of 7 VA aircraft had been deployed further south against Finnish forces in Svir-Petrozavodsk Offensive.
17 July 1944	Luftwaffe III./JG5	Pilots of III./JG5 claimed 37 (at 18.59–19.30)including Schuck and Glöckner both having 7. Soviet data checked by Rune Rautio and Yuri Rybin found only 2 Soviet aircraft lost in that action. Most of 7 VA aircraft had been deployed further south against Finnish forces in Svir-Petrozavodsk Offensive.
25 July 1944	31st Fighter Group	31st FG HQ/307th Fighter Squadron/308th Fighter Squadron/309th Fighter Squadron vs Hans Rudel's SG.2 and Hungarian Stukas of 102/2. Dive Squadron and I./Stg 77. USAF Claims of 26 to 28 enemy aircraft. Axis loss were from 9 Stukas
17 August 1944	Luftwaffe III./JG 5	Pilots of III./JG 5 claimed 40 Soviet aircraft during that day (35 found in 'supplementary claim from lists') . Soviet data checked by Rune Rautio and Yuri Rybin: 4 shot down by German fighters, 7 shot down by AA and one destroyed for unknown reason. From early June to late August just 2 Soviet fighter regiments were operating in sector of III./JG 5.
28 October 1944	Luftwaffe II./JG54 and 2./JG54 vs Soviet Air Force 8 GvShAP/47 ShAP in Libau	Pilots of II./JG54 Broch, Rudorffer, Tangermann and Thyben claimed 14 Il-2 shot down at 11.44–11.56 and Ludwig Böes of 2./JG54 two other Il-2 (half hour later). Soviet losses of that day in Libau area were just three Il-2. Two Il-2 of 47 ShAp were shot down more likely by Rudorffer or Tangermann or both (or one by Thyben). Soviet 8 GvShAP lost one Il-2 and most likely shot down by Broch. None of claims of Ludwig Böes can be found on Soviet loss data of that day. Total German claims were 16 Il-2. Soviet confirmed losses of 3 Il-2. 47 ShAp logbook states: "8 Il-2 came under attack of 8 Fw 190 and lost 2 a/c. Both Il-2 were shot up by fighters, and crashed in flames in the sea 8–9 km SW from Libau. Both crew killed." On the other hand, Soviet sources have confirmed Soviet losses been 28 aircraft failed to return and 10 force landed. Total German claims of that day in Courland: 28 by fighters, 31 by AA-troops. Details of Soviet losses are missing.
1944–1945	Luftwaffe	Oberleutnant Kurt Welter, claimed perhaps 25 Mosquitoes shot down by night and two further Mosquitoes by day while flying the Me 262, adding to his previous seven Mosquito kills in "hot-rodded" Bf 109G-6/AS or Fw 190 A-8 fighters. As far as can be ascertained, just three of his Me 262 claims over Mosquitoes coincide with RAF records.
1 January 1945	Luftwaffe	On this date German pilots overclaimed by between 4 and 3:1. During Operation Bodenplatte the Luftwaffe claimed 55 destroyed and 11 probably destroyed in air-to-air combat (according to document: Fernschreiben II.JakoIc Nr.140/44 geh.vom 3.1.1945). Other German sources (according to document: Luftwaffenführungsstab Ic, Fremde Luftwaffen West, Nr. 1160/45 g.Kdos.vom 25.2.1945), quote 65 claims and 12 probables. Just 31 Allied aircraft were hit. Fifteen were shot down in aerial combat, two were destroyed whilst on take-off and seven were damaged by enemy action.
24 March 1945	U.S. Army Air Force	The 332nd Fighter Group was awarded a Distinguished Unit Citation (DUC) for a mission, flown on 24 March 1945, escorting B–17s to bomb the Daimler-Benz tank factory at Berlin. American pilots claimed 11 Me 262 jet fighters; they were credited with three Me 262 jets of the Luftwaffe's Jagdgeschwader 7 JG 7 records show four Me 262s were lost. The bombers also made substantial claims, making it impossible to tell which units were actually responsible for those individual four kills.
8 May 1945	Luftwaffe	There is no evidence from either the American or the Soviet archives that Erich Hartmann of I./JG 52 shot down any aircraft on the final day of the war. No losses around the Brno area were found when checking the 5th and 17th Air Army documents, and no hostile encounter between American and Soviet aircraft were found in the documents either.
18 August 1945	U.S. Air Force	In what became the last aerial combat of the Second World War, two B-32 Dominators flying over areas in and around Tokyo in reconnaissance were attacked by a group of fighters belonging to the Atsugi and Yokosuka Kokutai, one B-32 was severely damaged and the other escaped largely unharmed; the B-32 gunners later claimed to have damaged one fighter and "probably destroyed" two others, although the Japanese lost no fighters that day.

== See also ==
- Aerial victory standards of World War I
- Confirmation bias
- Equipment losses in World War II
  - German and Allied aircraft losses during Operation Bodenplatte
- Fog of war
- Ghost of Kyiv
- Military intelligence
- Selective perception
- Verification bias

== Bibliography ==
=== Primary sources ===
- Statistical summary of Eighth Air Force operations: European theater, 17 Aug. 1942 – 8 May 1945. 8th Air Force. 1945. p. 83.

=== Literature ===
- Bergström, Christer (2007a). Barbarossa – The Air Battle: July–December 1941. Hersham: Midland Publishing. p. 144. ISBN 978-1-85780-270-2.
- Bergström, Christer (2007b). Stalingrad – The Air Battle: November 1942 – February 1943. Hersham: Midland Publishing. p. 144. ISBN 978-1-85780-276-4.
- Bergström, Christer (2007c). Kursk – The Air Battle: July 1943. Manchester: Classic Publications. p. 144. ISBN 978-1-903223-88-8.
- Bergström, Christer (2015). Battle of Britain: An Epic Conflict Revisited. London: Casemate / Vaktel Forlag. p. 336. ISBN 978-1-61200-347-4.
- Brown, Russell (2000). Desert Warriors: Australian P-40 Pilots at War in the Middle East and North Africa, 1941–1943. Maryborough, Queensland, Australia: Banner Books. ISBN 978-1-875593-22-4.
- Bungay, Stephen (2000). The Most Dangerous Enemy: A History of the Battle of Britain. London, UK: Aurum Press. ISBN 978-1-85410-721-3.
- Caldwell, Donald L. (1991). JG 26: Top Guns of the Luftwaffe. New York: Ivy Books. ISBN 978-0-8041-1050-1.
- Caldwell, Donald L. (1996). The JG 26 War Diary: Volume One 1939–1942. London, UK: Grubstreet. ISBN 978-1-898697-52-7.
- Caldwell, Donald L.; Muller, Richard R. (2007). The Luftwaffe over Germany: Defense of the Reich. London, UK: Greenhill Books. ISBN 978-1-85367-712-0.
- Hess, William (1994). B-17 Flying Fortress: Combat and Development History of the Flying Fortress. Motorbooks international. ISBN 978-0-87938-881-2.
- Hinchcliffe, Peter (1996). The Other Battle: Luftwaffe Night Aces vs Bomber Command. London: Zenith Press. ISBN 978-0-7603-0265-1.
- Horvath, Daniel; Horvath, Gabor (2022). Verified Victories: Top JG 52 Aces Over Hungary 1944–45. Warwick, UK: Helion & Company. ISBN 978-1-915070-87-6.
- Lake, Jon (2000). The Battle of Britain. Leicester: Amereon. ISBN 978-1-85605-535-2.
- Lundstrom, John B. (1984). The First Team: Pacific naval air combat from Pearl Harbor to Midway. Annapolis, Md.: Naval Institute Press. ISBN 978-0-87-021189-8.
- Keskinen, Kalevi (2006). Suomen ilmavoimien historia 26 – Ilmavoitot, osa 1. Espoo: Kari Stenman. ISBN 952-99432-8-8.
- Lorant, Jean Yves; Goyat, Richard (2005). Jagdgeschwader 300 "Wilde Sau": June 1943 – September 1944. Vol. I. Hamilton, Montana: Eagle Edition. ISBN 978-0-9761034-0-0.
- Manrho, John; Pütz, Ron (2004). Bodenplatte: The Luftwaffe's Last Hope-The Attack on Allied Airfields, New Year's Day 1945. Ottringham, UK: Hikoki Publications. ISBN 978-1-902109-40-4.
- Pataky, Iván; Rozsos, László; Sárhidai, Gyula (1988). Légi háború Magyarország felett. Második kötet (in Hungarian). Budapest: Zrínyi Kiadó. ISBN 978-963-327-163-6.
- Peart, Alan (2008). From North Africa to the Arakan. Grub Street Publishing. ISBN 978-1-906502-03-4.
- Prien, Jochen; Rodeike, Peter; Stemmer, Gerhard (1998). Messerschmitt Bf 109 im Einsatz bei Stab und I./Jagdgeschwader 27, 1939 – 1945 [Messerschmitt Bf 109 in Action with the Headquarters Unit and I./Jagdgeschwader 27, 1939 – 1945] (in German). Eutin, Germany: Struve-Druck. ISBN 978-3-923457-46-5.
- Rahkola, Erkki; Geust, Carl-Fredrik (2008). Vaiettu Elisenvaaran pommitus : evakkohelvetti 20. kesäkuuta 1944 [The Silent Bombing of Elisenvaara: Evacuee Hell 20 June 1944] (in Finnish). Helsingissä: Ajatus. ISBN 978-951-20-7637-6.
- Ralph, Wayne (2008). Aces, Warriors and Wingmen: The Firsthand Accounts of Canada's Fighter Pilots in the Second World War. Mississauga: John Wiley & Sons. p. 288. ISBN 978-0-470-15814-2.
- Shores, Christopher F.; Franks, Norman & Guest, Russell F. (1990). Above the Trenches: a Complete Record of the Fighter Aces and Units of the British Empire Air Forces 1915–1920. London, UK: Grub Street. ISBN 978-0-948817-19-9.
- Spick, Mike (1996). Luftwaffe Fighter Aces. New York: Ivy Books. ISBN 978-0-8041-1696-1.
- Spick, Mike (2011). Luftwaffe Fighter Aces. Frontline Books. p. 248. ISBN 978-1-78337-578-3. (reprint)
- Shores, Christopher (2005). Air War for Burma: The Allied Air Forces Fight Back in South-East Asia 1942–1945. London: Grub Street. ISBN 978-1-904010-95-1.
- Thomas, Andrew; Davey, Chris (2008). Griffon Spitfire Aces. Oxford, UK: Osprey Publishing. ISBN 978-1-84603-298-1.
- Tillman, Barrett (1990). Wildcat: The F4F in WW II. Annapolis: Naval Institute Press. ISBN 978-0-87021-789-0.
- Tillman, Barrett (2014). US Marine Corps Fighter Squadrons of World War II. Bloomsbury Publishing. p. 336. ISBN 978-1-78200-953-5.
- Uitto, Antero; Geust, Carl-Fredrik (2016). Taistelu Suomenlahden ulkosaarista [Battle for the Outer Islands of the Gulf of Finland] (in Finnish). Jyväskylä: Docendo. ISBN 978-952-291-285-5.
- Valtonen, Hannu (1997). Luftwaffen pohjoinen sivusta: Saksan ilmavoimat Suomessa ja Pohjois-Norjassa 1941–1944 (in Finnish). Tikkakoski: Keski-Suomen Ilmailumuseo. ISBN 978-951-95688-5-0.
- Ward, John (2004). Hitler's Stuka Squadrons: The Ju 87 at War, 1936–1945. St. Paul, MN: MBI. ISBN 978-0-7603-1991-8.
- Weal, John (1999). Messerschmitt Bf 110 Zerstörer Aces World War 2. Aircraft of the Aces. Vol. 25. London, UK: Osprey Publishing. ISBN 1-85532-753-8.
- Weal, John (2006). Bf 109 Defence of the Reich Aces. Aircraft of the Aces. Vol. 68. Oxford, UK: Osprey Publishing. ISBN 978-1-84176-879-3.
