= Suzanne K. Kearns =

- Born: Suzanne Robinson; 1979 (age 46–47); Wiarton, Ontario
- Occupations: Professor and Author
- Employer: University of Waterloo

Suzanne K. Kearns (born 1979) is a Canadian author, academic, and professor of aviation who works at the University of Waterloo. She is the Founding Director of the Waterloo Institute for Sustainable Aeronautics (WISA) and teaches within the Aviation programs. Her research specializations are aviation safety, training methodologies, and human factors. She is best known as the founder of WISA, author of several aviation books and Series Editor of the 'Aviation Fundamentals' textbook series, and for her work supporting the International Next Generation of Aviation Professionals (NGAP) programme and Global Aviation Training initiatives with the International Civil Aviation Organization (ICAO).

== Education ==
Kearns began flight training at the age of 15 in Wiarton, Ontario, Canada. She completed her fixed-wing training in Wiarton, Ontario and her rotary-wing training in Buttonville, Ontario in advance of her 17th birthday. She then completed the Helicopter Pilot Flight Program (including Commercial Rotary-Wing Pilot license) with Canadore College followed by her Bachelor of Science degree in Aeronautical Science (including Commercial Multi-Engine IFR fixed-wing license/ratings) and Master of Science in Human Factors and Systems Engineering, both from Embry-Riddle Aeronautical University in Daytona Beach, Florida. Kearns earned her Doctorate of Philosophy from Capella University in Education, specializing in Instructional Design for Online Learning.

== Career ==
Kearns began working full time as a lecturer of aviation at the University of Western Ontario in 2004, at the age of 24. She progressed to a tenure-track Assistant Professor in 2008 after earning her PhD and subsequently earned academic tenure in 2014. In 2016 she accepted an invitation to move to the University of Waterloo, as an Associate Professor with Tenure.

Kearns has taught the following academic courses: Introduction to Aviation, Human Factors, Aviation Safety, and Sustainability in Aviation.

Her research focuses on aviation safety and training methodologies. She is the author of a wide variety of aviation trade publications, academic journal articles, and several books. Kearns frequently participates as a speaker at aviation events. She is recognized as a thought-leader in the area of aviation training, specifically teaching methodologies (such as e-learning and competency-based training) and around engaging the next generation of aviation professionals.

In 2017, Kearns (in partnership with Michael Kearns) developed an e-learning course called 'Aviation Fundamentals' (AviFun). The University of Waterloo and the International Civil Aviation Organization jointly distribute the AviFun course. The AviFun course is designed to teach young people about the aviation industry, on an international scale. It is interactive, narrated by Suzanne Kearns, and reviews a variety of aviation sectors (air law, aircraft, operations, air navigation, airports, security, the environment, accidents, and safety). The course is available on the ICAO training website and is completed by thousands of professionals around the world.

Books by Suzanne K Kearns
Title	Year	Publisher	Synopsis
Canadian Aviation	2009	Kendall-Hunt	A textbook that explores sectors of the aviation industry in Canada.
e-Learning in Aviation	2010	Ashgate/Routledge	An academic book that reviews the aspects and structure of high-quality e-learning in aviation, as well as principles of instructional design for online learning.
Competency-Based Education in Aviation: Exploring Alternate Training Pathways	2016	Ashgate/Routledge	Kearns co-authored with Timothy J. Mavin and Steven Hodge. An academic book that explores the foundation underlying 'competence' in aviation, based on interviews with international training experts, which is the theory supporting evidence-based and competency-based training
Fundamentals of International Aviation	2018	Routledge	An introductory textbook that explores sectors of the international aviation industry, from air law to airports, operations to security. This textbook is designed to support young professionals seeking an aviation career. This is the book that launched the 'Aviation Fundamentals' textbook series
Engaging the Next Generation of Aviation Professionals: An Edited Volume	2020	Routledge	Kearns is lead editor of a book that will include chapters and case studies from more than 40 aviation academics and professionals from around the world. Thought to be the first academic work on the 'Next Generation of Aviation Professionals (NGAP)' issue
Fundamentals of International Aviation, 2nd Edition	2021	Routledge	This text provides a foundation of ‘how aviation works’ in preparation for any career in the field (including regulators, maintenance engineers, pilots, flight attendants, airline and airport managers, dispatchers, and air traffic controllers, among many others). Each chapter introduces a different cross-section of the industry, from air law to operations, security to environmental impacts. A variety of learning tools are built into each chapter, including 24 case studies that describe an aviation accident related to each topic. This second edition adds new learning features, geographic representation from Africa, a new chapter on economics, full-color illustrations, and updated and enhanced online resources.

== Awards and Volunteer Work ==
Kearns is a member of the Next Generation of Aviation Professionals (NGAP) task force, through which she volunteers to support the aviation industry's efforts to attract, recruit, educate, and retain the next generation. She was elected President of the University Aviation Association, 2015-2016, where she represented about 150 colleges/universities with aviation programs.

In 2013 Kearns was the recipient of the Frank E Sorensen award for 'Outstanding Achievement of Excellence in Aviation Research/Scholarship'. In 2017, Kearns was recognized by Wings Magazine as one of the Top 20 under 40 in Canadian Aviation and in the same year she was also elected as a Fellow of the Royal Aeronautical Society (FRAeS). In 2018 the University Aviation Association awarded Kearns the William A. Wheatley award recognizing outstanding contributions to aerospace education.

In 2019, Kearns received the Elise MacGill Northern Lights award (Education Category) recognizing women who make outstanding contributions to aviation and aerospace.

== Waterloo Institute for Sustainable Aeronautics (WISA) ==
The Waterloo Institute for Sustainable Aeronautics (WISA) is the world’s leading hub for sustainable aeronautical research, technology, and education. Dr. Suzanne Kearns is the Founding Director of WISA.

Designed to be different, WISA mobilizes the interdisciplinary research capacity of all six faculties at the University of Waterloo to drive meaningful change within the aviation, aerospace, and space industries.
