= Robert B. Williams (general) =

United States Army Air Forces major general

Robert Boyd Williams
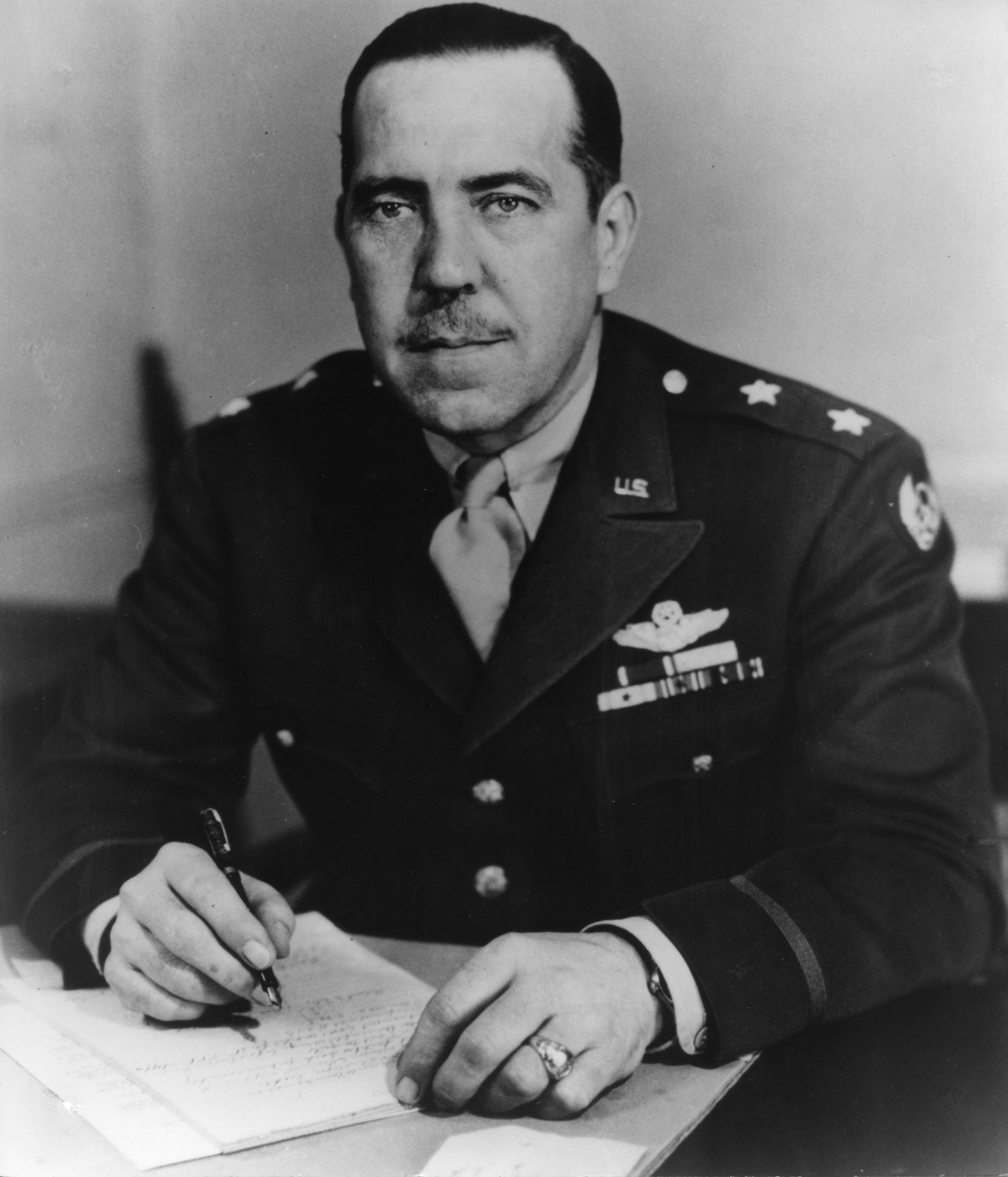
- Major General Robert B. Williams
- Born: November 9, 1901; Albany, Texas
- Died: February 10, 1977 (aged 75); San Antonio, Texas
- Military career
- Allegiance: United States
- Branch: United States Air Force
- Service years: 1923–1946
- Rank: Major General
- Commands: 49th Bombardment Squadron; 2nd Bombardment Group; II Bomber Command; 16th Bombardment Operational Training Wing; 1st Bomb Division; Second Air Force
- Conflicts: World War II
- Awards: Distinguished Service Cross; Distinguished Service Medal

Robert Boyd Williams (November 9, 1901 – February 10, 1977) was a major general in the United States Army Air Forces and an eminent combat commander during World War II. He personally led the B-17 raid on the Schweinfurt ball-bearing factories on 17 August 1943, the first large-scale deep penetration bombing raid on Germany. He was also an important personage in the training of heavy bombardment units both before and after his combat tour.

== Early life ==
Robert B. Williams was born in the small Texas city of Albany and graduated from Texas Agricultural and Mechanical College with a Bachelor of Science degree in civil engineering in 1923. He was commissioned a second lieutenant in the Army Air Service on June 6, 1923.

== Pre-war career ==
Williams entered flying training in June 1923 at Brooks Field in San Antonio. In January 1924, he began advanced flying training at nearby Kelly Field.

From August 1924 to October 1924, Williams served as Squadron Adjutant at Kelly Field. From October 1924 to June 1925, he attended the Photography Course at the Air Service Technical School at Chanute Field, Illinois. From June 1925 to May 1926, Williams served with the 5th Observation Squadron at Mitchel Field, New York. While stationed there, as a second lieutenant, he was reported missing in the newspapers on a flight to Washington. In May 1926, Williams was transferred to France Field in the Panama Canal Zone, where he served with the 6th Composite Group and the 7th Observation Squadron. There, on 11 November 1927, he was promoted to first lieutenant. In 1928, he was commended for making an emergency landing in a crater lake in El Salvador and then spiraling his plane out of this hazardous area after refueling. In July 1928, he became the operations officer of the 24th Pursuit Squadron at France Field and a year later, was assigned to command the 12th Photo Section, 24th Pursuit Squadron.

In May 1930, Williams returned to the U.S., assigned as a flying instructor at the primary training school March Field, California. In August 1931, he transferred to Randolph Field, Texas where he also served as a flight instructor. From August 1933 to June 1934, Williams attended the Air Corps Tactical School, Maxwell Field, Alabama. Williams moved to Rockwell Field, California in August 1934, where he served as secretary (adjutant) and senior instructor, Advanced Air Navigation Training Unit. In April 1935, he was promoted to captain and assigned to the 30th Bombardment Squadron, also at Rockwell Field. From August 1936 to June 1937, Williams attended the U.S. Army Command and General Staff School at Fort Leavenworth, Kansas.

In June 1937, Williams was assigned as operations officer of the 2nd Bombardment Group, General Headquarters Air Force, Langley Field, Virginia. The 2nd Bomb Group received the first 12 B-17 Flying Fortresses delivered to the Air Corps in March 1937. In February 1938, Williams participated in a goodwill tour by six B-17s from Langley Field to Buenos Aires, Argentina, and back. Williams was commended in connection with that flight. The flight to Argentina represented the longest distance performance of its kind to date and subsequently earned the 2nd Bomb Group the Mackay Trophy. In May 1938, Williams was assigned to the 49th Bombardment Squadron at Langley Field and became squadron commander the next year. In November 1939, he took part in a second goodwill flight when seven B-17s of the 2nd Group flew to Rio de Janeiro, Brazil and back. Williams received the Order of the Southern Cross from the government of Brazil in 1940 for his participation in the Rio flight. Williams was promoted to major on 11 March 1940.

From September 1940 to 31 January 1941 Williams was detached from the 2nd Bomb Group to act as a military observer in England during the Blitz. He was wounded during an air raid on London, losing an eye. Upon his return from the UK, Williams resumed duty with the 2nd BG, assigned as group commander in April, upon which he submitted a favorable report on the merits of the Royal Air Force's operational training (OTU) system, based on his observations, to the Training and Operations Division of the Office of Chief of Air Corps. Promoted to lieutenant colonel on 8 November 1941, he was still in command of the 2nd BG when the Japanese attacked Pearl Harbor and brought the United States into World War II. Williams was immediately moved to staff duty at the headquarters of the First Air Force at Mitchel Field on 10 December 1941, assigned to the I Bomber Command, and was promoted to colonel on 1 March 1942.

== World War II ==
On 21 September 1942 Williams received promotion to brigadier general, having risen from captain to general officer in 31 months. He subsequently became commanding general of the II Bomber Command at Fort George Wright, Washington. On 4 April 1943, he became commanding general of the 16th Bombardment Operational Training Wing headquartered at Biggs Field, El Paso, Texas. In July 1943 the commanding general of the 1st Bomb Wing of the 8th Air Force, Brig. Gen. Frank A. Armstrong Jr., was severely injured in a fire in his quarters and Williams was sent to England to replace him. He subsequently continued as commanding general of the new 1st Bombardment Division on its activation 16 September 1943.

=== The first Schweinfurt raid ===
Soon after taking command of the 1st Bombardment Wing, Williams led a large mission beyond the range of escort fighters to bomb ball bearing factories in Schweinfurt, on 17 August 1943. Production of ball bearings was concentrated at Schweinfurt and was identified by Allied planners of the Combined Bomber Offensive as a key "bottleneck" target, the destruction of which could impair German war production. The 1st Bomb Wing consisted of nine combat groups and so was organized for the mission into four "provisional combat bomb wings" to facilitate command and control, a restructuring that foreshadowed the reorganization of the wing into the 1st Bomb Division a month later.

Schweinfurt was the primary target of a larger mission in which aircraft factories at Regensburg were to be attacked simultaneously by B-17s of the 4th Bombardment Wing, to divide Luftwaffe interceptor reaction, with the Regensburg force continuing on to North Africa instead of returning to its home bases. The "double strike" had already been postponed once by bad weather. Timing was crucial to success of the plan, complicated by the 11-hour length of the Regensburg mission, which required a takeoff soon after dawn to allow it to reach North African bases while it was still daylight. A thick fog covered the bases of both forces at the scheduled takeoff time, however, forcing a postponement of launch of the mission. The Regensburg force delayed its takeoff 90 minutes but then proceeded, while Williams' force was delayed a further four hours. Rather than postpone the mission again, the Schweinfurt force also took off, completely disrupting the timing of the mission. The Regensburg force was nearly to its target, which allowed the entire German interceptor force to refuel and rearm before concentrating on the second mission.

During the intense air battle that ensued, more than 300 German fighters attacked the Schweinfurt force, shooting down 36 of its 222 bombers. Williams flew the mission as co-pilot of a B-17 in the lead group and manned a machine gun in the nose of the bomber, firing until the barrel burned out. Despite a loss of 60 B-17s to the combined force, bombing efforts on the whole were good, causing an immediate drop in ball bearing production and forcing German industry to dip into its limited stockpiles to continue manufacturing. However planners were unaware that an immediate follow-up strike was necessary to overcome the resiliency of German industry until intelligence reports indicated a frantic effort by the Germans to rebuild and obtain ball bearings. A second mission utilizing the entire B-17 force was flown 14 October, once again beyond escort range, and another 60 bombers were lost. Further deep penetration strikes were abandoned until long range fighter escort became available in early 1944.

After the war, Major Major General Haywood S. Hansell wrote about Williams,

Bob Williams's achievements are less well known, but his stature looms as great in the eyes of his men and associates. Actually, neither could exercise much command control during the mission. Their contribution had come in the months of training and indoctrination and inspiration. But their presence on the mission meant a lot to the crews and to the conduct of the operation.

Bob Williams was a few years senior to the rest of us. He had been one of the few chosen to pilot a B-17 in the early days of the 2d Bombardment Group at Langley Field, Virginia. To me he seemed the very personification of "the officer and gentleman." As a commander he was urbane and personable without any hint of familiarity. He was an exacting but an understanding taskmaster, and whatever the job he demanded, he could do it better himself. It has seemed to me that the perfect achievement of leadership lies in getting other people to do what you want them to do because you are convinced that it is both right and necessary to do, and they are inspired to want to do it. To my mind, Bob Williams provided that kind of leadership. He was the "follow me" kind of leader.

Bob Williams had been selected to go to England as an observer before the U.S. entered the war. He was wounded and lost an eye during a heavy air raid on London. He had chosen to view the scene from the roof of his hotel rather than seek safety in a shelter. A bomb falling close at hand blasted nearby windows, and glass shards damaged one eye beyond repair. This would have sent most men to retirement or to inactive posts. Williams recovered enough to keep right on going.

On the Schweinfurt mission, Williams and his division went through torture during the hours of waiting for the weather to clear enough to permit takeoff. They knew that the carefully integrated plan of operations had been thrown out of balance by the fog that held the 1st Bomb Division on the ground long after the 3d Bomb Division had departed.

General Nathan Twining, who served many years with Bob Williams, says: "He is a wonderful man. Solid. Calm. Strong character. Competent. Great pilot. Great leader. One of the best."

=== Later Action ===
Williams commanded the 1st Bomb Division in the first largescale daylight attack against Berlin on March 6, 1944.

=== Return to U.S. ===
Williams returned to the United States in October 1944 to become commanding general of the Second Air Force, Colorado Springs, Colorado. In this capacity he directed the training of B-29 units and crews for service in the strategic bombing campaign by Twentieth Air Force against the Japanese home islands. Williams served in that capacity until November 1945.

== Awards and decorations ==
Williams' decorations from World War II included the Distinguished Service Cross, the Distinguished Service Medal, Great Britain's Order of the Bath, and France's Legion of Honor and Croix de Guerre. The Distinguished Service Cross (DSC) is the second highest military decoration that can be awarded to a member of the United States Army, awarded for extreme gallantry and risk of life in actual combat with an armed enemy force. Williams and several other Texas A&M alumni general officers were conferred honorary doctorates by the university on April 21, 1946.

== Later life ==
Williams retired, disability received in the line of duty, on 1 July 1946 as a major general. He lived in San Antonio during his retirement, and died on 10 February 1977 at the age of 75. According to military veterans' records, Williams and his wife Amy are interred in Section 6 of Fort Sam Houston National Cemetery.

== Memorial ==
A sculpture by New Mexico artist Duke Sundt honoring Williams and two other World War II heroes was dedicated in February 2006 at the courthouse in Williams' hometown of Albany, Texas. The Albany Heroes' Monument honors Williams, Lt. Col. William E. Dyess, namesake of Dyess Air Force Base, and Rear Admiral Emory Arden Grantham, who supervised wartime Naval ship repairs at the Puget Sound Naval Shipyard and the Pearl Harbor Naval Shipyard. The life size bas relief portraits are accompanied by biographical information on plaques.

The memorial lists Williams' rank as Lieutenant General and says that he retired in the 1950s.
