= Schweinfurt–Regensburg mission =

1943 US Army Air Forces strategic bombing mission during World War II

Schweinfurt-Regensburg mission
- Part of Operation Pointblank
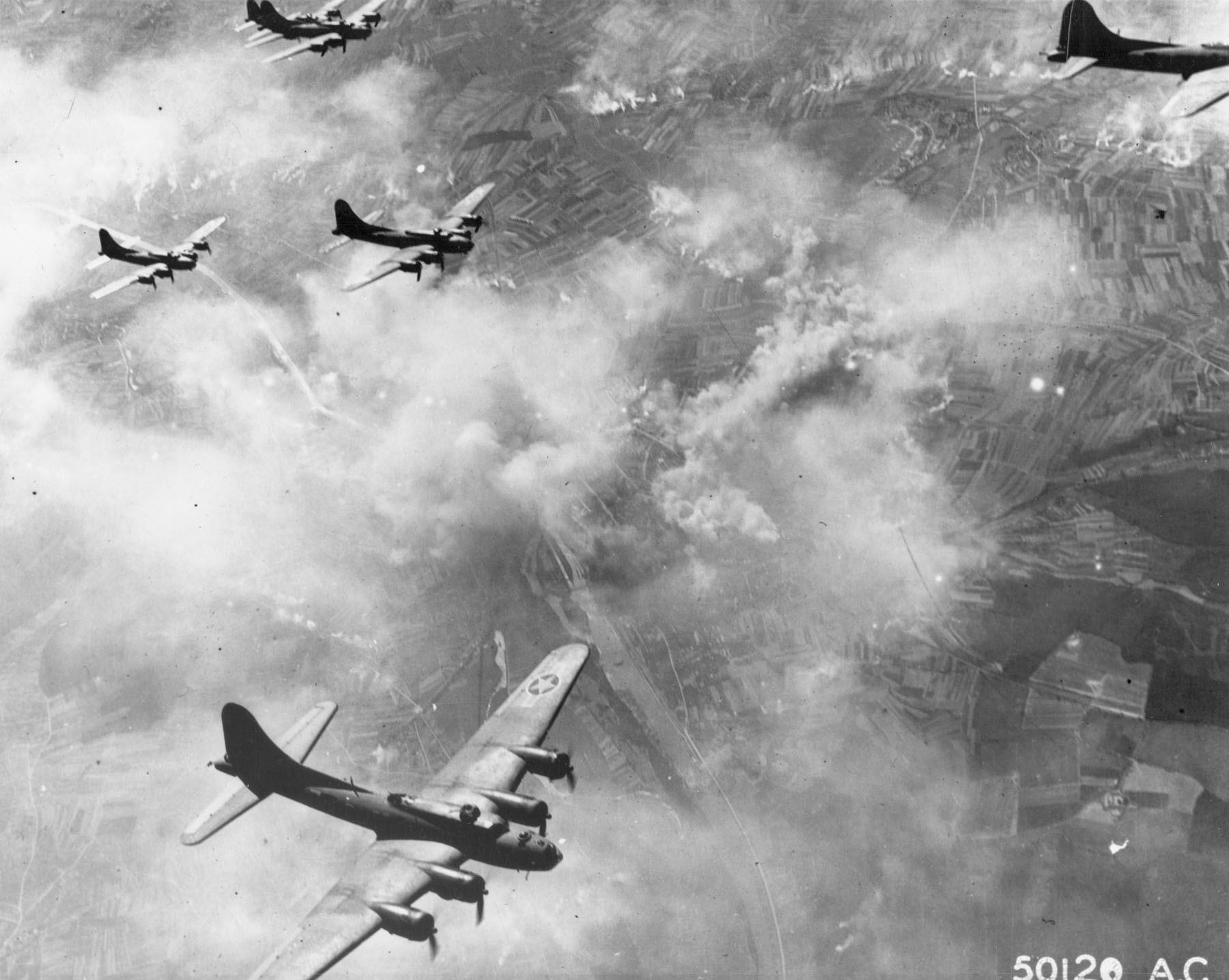
- 1st Bomb Wing B-17s over Schweinfurt, Germany
Date	August 17, 1943
Location	Schweinfurt and Regensburg, Germany
Result	German victory

Belligerents
United States; United Kingdom	Nazi Germany

Commanders and leaders
(United States) Curtis LeMay (United States) Robert B. Williams	(Nazi Germany) Adolf Galland

Units involved
(United States) Eighth Air Force (United Kingdom) RAF Fighter Command	(Nazi Germany) Luftwaffe

Strength
376 B-17 heavy bombers 268 P-47 fighter sorties 191 Spitfire fighter sorties	Approx. 400 Bf 109, Bf 110, Fw 190 and other fighters

Casualties and losses
60 bombers, 3 P-47s, and 2 Spitfires lost 58-95 bombers heavily damaged (Note: Sources vary as the number lost. Most of the damaged aircraft were stranded in French Algeria and some never returned to service, due to the lack of repair facilities there.); 7 aircrew KIA and 21 WIA aboard returning aircraft 557 aircrew MIA or POW	25–27 fighters 203 civilians killed

The Schweinfurt–Regensburg mission was a strategic bombing mission during World War II carried out by Boeing B-17 Flying Fortress heavy bombers of the US Army Air Forces on August 17, 1943. The mission was an ambitious plan to cripple the German aircraft industry; it was also known as the "double-strike mission" because it entailed two large forces of bombers attacking separate targets in order to disperse fighter reaction by the Luftwaffe. It was also the first American shuttle mission, in which all or part of a mission landed at a different field and later bombed another target before returning to its base.

After being postponed several times by unfavorable weather, the operation, known within the Eighth Air Force as "Mission No. 84", was flown on the anniversary of the first daylight raid by the Eighth Air Force.

Mission No. 84 was a strike by 376 bombers of 16 bomb groups against German heavy industry well beyond the range of escorting fighters. The mission inflicted heavy damage on the Regensburg target, but at catastrophic loss to the force, with 60 bombers lost and many more damaged beyond economical repair. As a result, the Eighth Air Force was unable to follow up immediately with a second attack that might have seriously crippled German industry. When Schweinfurt was attacked again two months later, the lack of long-range fighter escort had still not been addressed and losses were even higher. As a consequence, deep penetration strategic bombing was curtailed for five months.

As soon as the reconnaissance photographs were received on the evening of the 17th, Generals Eaker and Anderson knew that the Schweinfurt raid had been a failure. The excellent results at Regensburg were small consolation for the loss of 60 B-17s. The results of the bombing were exaggerated, and the high losses were well disguised in after-mission reports. Everyone who flew the mission stressed the importance of the escorts in reducing losses; the planners grasped only that Schweinfurt would have to be bombed again, soon, in another deep-penetration, unescorted mission.

— Donald Caldwell

== Background ==
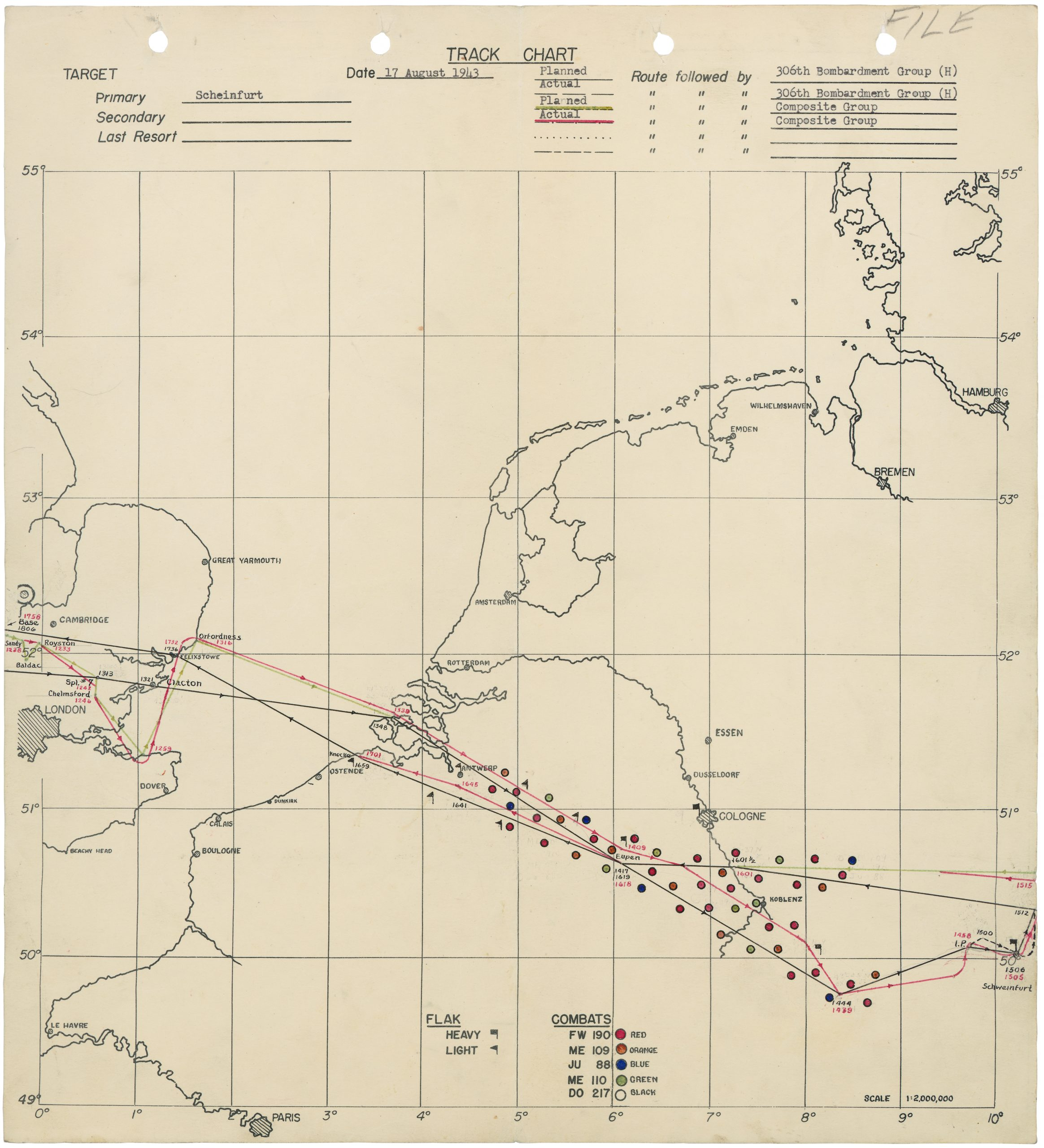
Track chart of the Schweinfurt–Regensburg mission

Because of diversions of groups to the invasion of North Africa, the bomber force in England had been limited in size to four groups of B-17s and two of Consolidated B-24 Liberators until May 1943. At that time, and in conjunction with the Pointblank Directive to destroy the Luftwaffe in preparation for the invasion of Europe, the B-17 force had expanded fourfold and was organized into the 1st and 3rd Bombardment Wings, which due to their large size were soon re-designated Bomb Divisions. The 1st Bombardment Wing, which included all of the original B-17 groups, was based in the English Midlands while the 3rd Bombardment Wing stations were located in East Anglia.

Pointblank operations in April and July 1943 had concentrated solely on the production of the Focke-Wulf Fw 190 at factories in Bremen, Kassel, and Oschersleben, and although serious losses to the bomber forces had occurred, the attacks had been successful enough to warrant attacking those manufacturing Messerschmitt Bf 109s.

The production of Bf 109s (and almost half of all German fighters) was located in Regensburg in Bavaria and in Wiener Neustadt, Austria. To attack these in sufficient force, "Operation Juggler" was conceived, in which the fighter production plants in Wiener Neustadt were targeted for attack by B-24 Liberators of the Ninth Air Force based in Libya, and Regensburg by B-17s of the Eighth Air Force. The original mission date of August 7 could not be met because of bad weather, and the B-24s flew Operation Juggler on August 13 without participation by the Eighth Air Force, which was still hampered by unacceptable weather conditions.

=== The mission plan ===
To successfully complete its portion of the attack, the Eighth Air Force decided to attack a target in central Germany as well as Regensburg to divide and confuse German air defenses. The 3rd Bombardment Wing, using B-17s equipped with "Tokyo (fuel) tanks" for longer range, would attack the Messerschmitt Bf 109 plants in Regensburg and then fly on to bases in Bône, Berteaux and Telergma (French Algeria).

The 1st Bombardment Wing, following it, would turn northeast and bomb the ball-bearing factories of Schweinfurt, where almost the entire production of bearings was centralized, and by doing so catch German fighter aircraft on the ground re-arming and refueling. Due to the limited range, a result of inexplicably not employing drop tanks, escorting Republic P-47 Thunderbolt fighters would be able to protect the bombers only as far as Eupen, Belgium, which was roughly an hour's flying time from both of the targets.

Two supporting attacks were also made a part of the overall mission plan. The first, a diversionary attack, involved the bombing of three locations along the French and Dutch coast: the German airfields at Bryas-Sud and Marck by American Martin B-26 Marauder and Royal Air Force North American B-25 Mitchell medium bombers, and the marshalling yards at Dunkirk by other Mitchells, all timed to coincide with the Regensburg strike.

The second was a series of attacks on Luftwaffe fighter fields at Poix, Lille-Vendeville, and Woensdrecht by Hawker Typhoons of the RAF simultaneous with the diversionary attack, and Poix by two groups of B-26s in the afternoon as the Schweinfurt force was returning.

Donald Miller states: "LeMay's force was expected to take the brunt of the German counteroffensive, allowing the Schweinfurt armada to proceed to the target with only light resistance. With LeMay escaping over the Alps, the Schweinfurt force would be left to face the full fury of the Luftwaffe on its return to England. The plan was brutally simple: LeMay would fight his way in and Williams would fight his way out."

=== Weather delays ===
The length of Eighth Air Force bomber missions was calculated with one to two hours of climb and assembly into formations. The duration of the Regensburg mission was anticipated to be eleven hours, so that commanders had only a 90-minute "window" in which to launch the mission and still allow the 3rd Bombardment Wing B-17s to reach North Africa in daylight. Mission 84 planning indicated a takeoff window from dawn, approximately 06:30 British Double Summer Time, to approximately 08:00.

At dawn of August 17, after airmen had gone to their airplanes, England was covered in fog. The mission takeoff was delayed until 08:00, when the fog had cleared sufficiently over East Anglia to allow the 4th Bombardment Wing to take off using instruments, a technique they had practiced. Although attacking both targets simultaneously was deemed critical to success of the mission without prohibitive loss, the Regensburg force was ordered to take off even though the 1st Bombardment Wing remained grounded at its bases by the adverse weather.

By the time the fog had sufficiently cleared over the Midlands, the Regensburg force had already reached the Dutch coast, which indicated that reacting German fighters would have time to land, replenish, and attack the second task force. Consequently, the launch of the Schweinfurt force was further delayed to allow US escort fighters time to return to base to rearm for a second escort mission. In all, the 1st Wing was delayed more than three hours behind the 3rd Wing.

== Raids ==
=== Regensburg strike force ===
The Regensburg task force was led by the 3rd Bombardment Wing commander, Colonel Curtis E. LeMay. This mission would make LeMay's name as a combat leader. The task force consisted of seven B-17 groups totaling 146 aircraft, each group but one flying in a 21-aircraft combat box tactical formation. The groups were organized into three larger formations termed "provisional combat wings." Three groups in a Vee formation wing box led the procession, followed by two wing boxes of two groups each in echelon formation, with one group leading and the second trailing at a lower altitude. The groups flying at lower altitudes included the 388th, 100th, 381st and 303rd.

Regensburg Task Force organization
Provisonal wing	Group	UK airfield	Sent	Losses
403d PCBW	96th Bomb Group	Snetterton Heath	21	0
403d PCBW	388th Bomb Group	Knettishall	21	1
403d PCBW	390th Bomb Group	Framlingham	20	6
401st PCBW	94th Bomb Group	Bury St. Edmunds	21	1
401st PCBW	385th Bomb Group	Great Ashfield	21	3
402nd PCBW	95th Bomb Group	Horham	21	4
402nd PCBW	100th Bomb Group	Thorpe Abbotts	21	9

Fighter escort support
Times	Group	Leg	Sent	Claims
10:05–10:20	353rd Fighter Group	Haamstede to Diest	37 P-47	1
10;30–10;45	56th Fighter Group	Herentals to Eupen	50 P-47	0

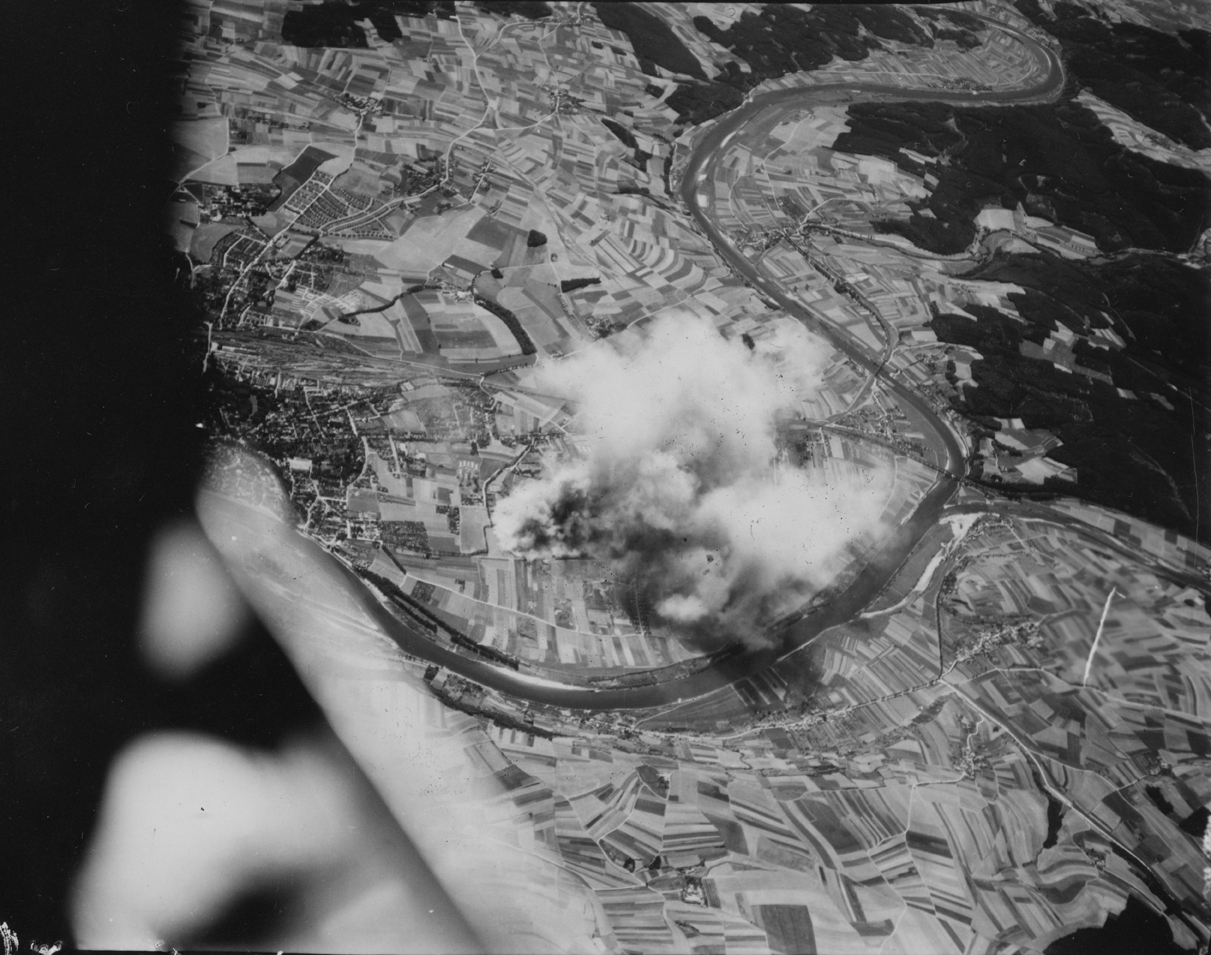
The Messerschmitt factory at Regensburg obscured by smoke after it was bombed

Approximately fifteen minutes after it crossed the coast at 10:00, the Regensburg force encountered the first German fighter interception, which continued with growing intensity nearly all the way to the target area. Several factors weighed against the Regensburg force in this air battle. The arrangement of two groups instead of three in the two following provisional wings meant a third fewer guns available to each for their mutual defense and made them more likely targets. The overall length of the task force was too great for effective fighter support.

The last wing formation of bombers was fifteen miles behind the first and nearly out of visual range. Of the two groups of P-47s (87 aircraft) tasked to escort the force to the German border, only one arrived at the rendezvous point on time, covering only the lead wing, and the second arrived fifteen minutes late. Both P-47 groups were forced to turn back to base after only fifteen minutes of escort duty, without engaging any German interceptors. The last provisional wing in the task force was left without any fighter protection at all.

After ninety minutes of combat the German fighter force broke off the engagement, low on fuel and ammunition. By then at least 15 bombers had been shot down or fatally damaged, 13 from the trailing formation. Anti-aircraft fire ("flak") was light over Regensburg and visibility clear, and of the remaining 131 bombers, 126 dropped 298.75 tons of bombs on the fighter aircraft factories with a high degree of accuracy at 11:43 British time.

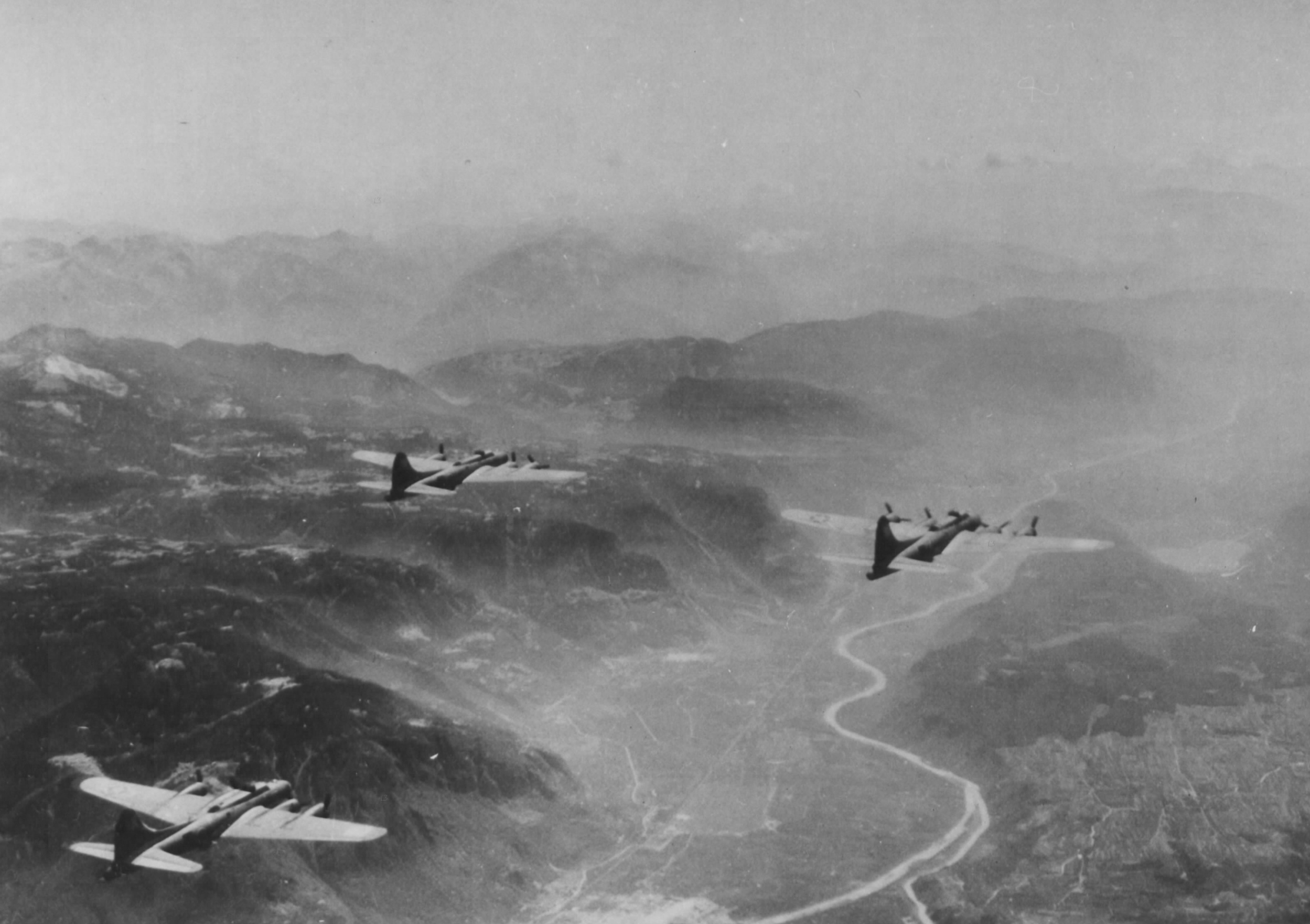
B-17s of the Regensburg strike force flying south over the Alps on their way to North Africa

The Regensburg force then turned south to cross the Alps, confronted by only a few twin-engined fighters, soon forced to disengage by lack of range. The German force had not been prepared for this contingency, but they were in the process of re-arming to meet the Schweinfurt force, then forming over East Anglia. Two damaged B-17s turned away from the Regensburg task force and landed in neutral Switzerland, where their crews were interned and the bombers confiscated. Colonel LeMay ordered the formation to perform two 10-minute turns over Switzerland, allowing damaged aircraft to rejoin the formation before flying to North Africa. Another crash-landed in Italy and five more were forced down by lack of fuel into the Mediterranean Sea. In all 24 bombers were lost. More than 60 of the 122 surviving aircraft landing in Tunisia had suffered battle damage.

=== Schweinfurt strike force ===
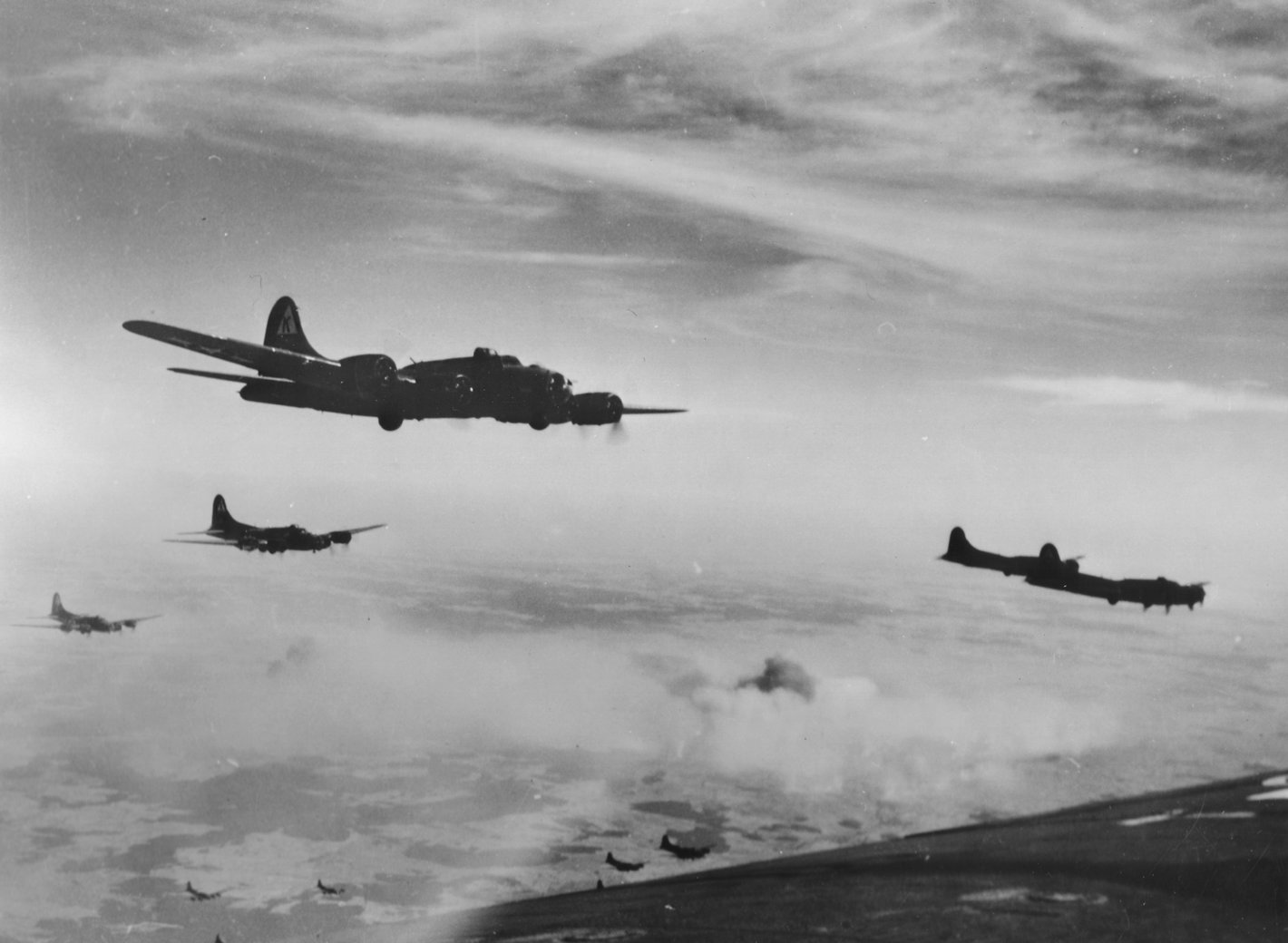
B-17s of the 379th Bomb Group, part of the Schweinfurt strike force

The 1st Bombardment Wing, commanded by Brigadier General Robert B. Williams, was made up of nine B-17 groups. Previously, because of this large number of groups, "provisional combat bomb wings" had been formed in April to control the groups tactically during large missions. To achieve a "maximum effort" against Schweinfurt, the 1st Bomb Wing, with sufficient aircraft and crews to employ four wing-sized boxes, formed provisional groups as well as wings, accomplished by eight groups providing a squadron or spare aircraft to form the "composite groups" needed to form a fourth combat wing.

The Schweinfurt force had 230 bombers, comprising 12 groups, divided into two task forces, each with two wings. Each wing was composed of a three group formation, and was more than twenty miles in length. Williams personally led the mission, flying as co-pilot in an aircraft of the lead formation, as wingman to the commander of the 91st Bomb Group.

Schweinfurt mission organization
Prov. Wing	Group	UK base	Sent	Losses
(first task force)
201st PCBW	91st Bomb Group	Bassingbourn	18	7
	"101st Composite Group" (Note: The 101 CG was made up of B-17s from the 381st (7), 351st (6), and 91st (6) BG. The 306 CG had 9 each from the 306th and 305th BG, and 2 from the 92d. The 103 CG had 11 from the 303d and 6 from the 379 BG.)		19	6
	381st Bomb Group	Ridgewell	20	9
202d PCBW	351st Bomb Group	Polebrook	21	1
	306th Composite Group		20	0
	384th Bomb Group	Grafton Underwood	18	5
(second task force)
203d PCBW	306th Bomb Group	Thurleigh	21	0
	305th Bomb Group	Chelveston	20	2
	92nd Bomb Group	Alconbury	20	2
204th PCBW	379th Bomb Group	Kimbolton	18	0
	103rd Composite Group		17	4
	303rd Bomb Group	Molesworth	18	0

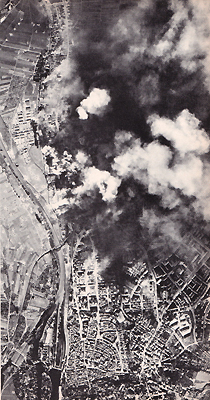
Smoke and dust rises over the ball bearing works in Schweinfurt, Germany

The Schweinfurt task forces followed the same route as the Regensburg force. Because of the delayed start of the mission, eight RAF squadrons of Spitfire fighters (96 aircraft) from 11 Group and 83 Group had been added to escort the Schweinfurt force as far as Antwerp, where P-47s would take over and escort it to Eupen. The field order for the mission specified that the B-17s would fly at altitudes between 23,000 and 26,500 feet (7,000–8,000 m), but approaching the coast of the Netherlands at 13:30, it was confronted with developing cloud masses not present earlier in the day. The commander of the first task force estimated that the bombers would not be able to climb over the clouds and elected to fly under them at 17,000 feet (5,000 m), increasing the vulnerability of the bombers to fighter attacks.

The first German attacks began almost immediately and employed different tactics from the morning mission. The lead wing was attacked continuously in head-on attacks by both Messerschmitt Bf 109 and Focke-Wulf Fw 190 fighters, and although the RAF escorts claimed eight victories they were forced to return to base early in the engagement. The two groups of P-47s (88 aircraft) arrived five and eight minutes late, and despite some individual combats, they too were forced to break off virtually as soon as they arrived.

Inside German airspace, the Bf 109 G-6 fighters of 5 Staffel/JG 11, which had pioneered the fitment of the Werfer-Granate 21 unguided air-to-air rocket weapon system to the Luftwaffe's single engine day fighter force the previous day, as well as the similarly armed rocket-launching twin-engined Bf 110 Zerstörer heavy fighters, including night fighters, joined the battle as more than 300 fighters from 24 bases opposed the raid. At 14:36 the force diverged from the morning's route at Worms, Germany, alerting the German defenders that the target was Schweinfurt.

Losses among the 57 B-17s of the lead wing were so severe that many among its airmen considered the possibility that the wing might be annihilated before reaching the target. However, 15 miles from Schweinfurt, the opposing fighters, after shooting down 22 bombers, disengaged and landed to refuel and re-arm in order to attack the force on its way out. Five miles from Schweinfurt, German anti-aircraft guns began firing an effective flak barrage into the path of the bomber force.

At 14:57 approximately 40 B-17s remained of the lead wing, when it dropped its bombs on the target area containing five factories and 30,000 workers, followed over a 24-minute span by the remainder of the force. Each wing found increasingly heavy smoke from preceding bomb explosions a hindrance to accuracy. 183 bombers dropped 424.3 tons of bombs, including 125 tons of incendiary bombs.

Three B-17s were shot down by flak over Schweinfurt. Fifteen minutes after leaving the target, each task force circled over the town of Meiningen to reassemble its formations, then continued west toward Brussels. At approximately 15:30, German fighters renewed their attacks, concentrating now on damaged bombers. Between 16:20 and 17:00 a covering force of 93 P-47s and 95 Spitfires (Note: RAF Fighter Command squadrons participating were: No. 129 Squadron RAF, No. 222 Squadron RAF, No. 303 Polish Fighter Squadron, No. 316 Polish Fighter Squadron, No. 331 (Norwegian) Squadron RAF, No. 332 (Norwegian) Squadron RAF, No. 403 Squadron RCAF, and No. 421 Squadron RCAF.) arrived to provide withdrawal support, claiming 21 fighters shot down. Eight more bombers were lost before the force reached the North Sea, where three more crash-landed. The Schweinfurt force lost a total of 36 bombers.

Schweinfurt fighter escort support
Times	Group	Leg	Sent	Claims	Losses
Penetration support
13:36–13:55	11 Group RAF	Walcheren to Antwerp	72 Spitfires	8	0
13:36–13:55	83 Group RAF	Walcheren to Antwerp	24 Spitfires	0	0
13:53–14:10	78th Fighter Group USAAF	Antwerp to Eupen	40 P-47	2	0
13:55–14:09	4th Fighter Group USAAF	Diest to Eupen	48 P-47	0	0
Withdrawal support
16:21–16:51	56th Fighter Group	Nideggen to Sint-Niklaas	51 P-47	16	3
16:41–17:00	353rd Fighter Group	Mechelen to Sint-Niklaas	42 P-47	0	0
16:47–17:15	11 Group RAF	Sint-Niklaas to England	72 Spitfires	3	0
17:20–17:40	83 Group RAF	Sint-Niklaas to England	23 Spitfires	2	2

== Aftermath ==
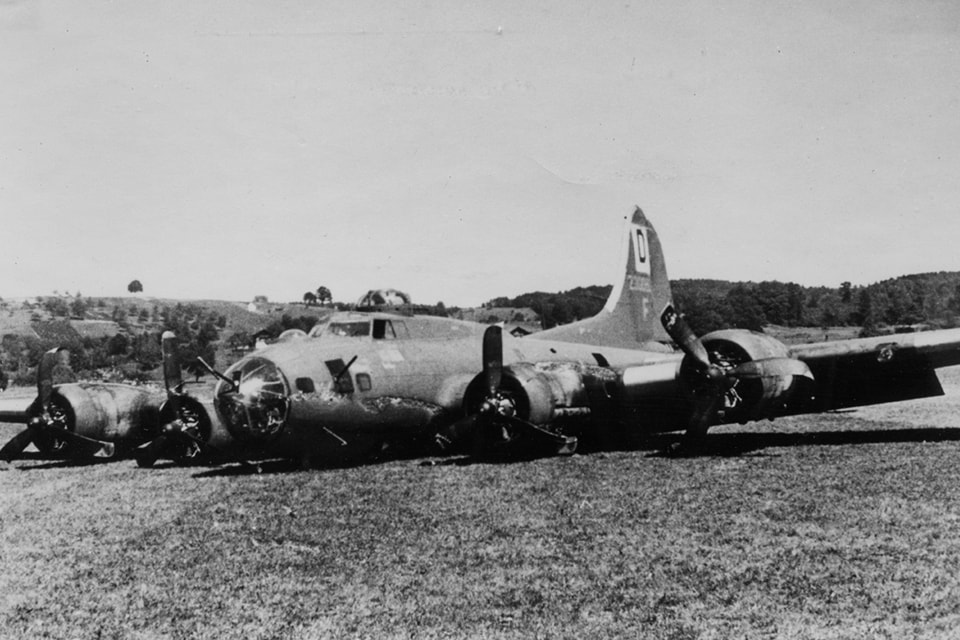
A B-17 nicknamed "High Life" of the 100th Bomb Group that crash landed in Switzerland, where the plane and its crew were interned

The Americans listed 55 of their bombers with 552 crewmen as missing after the August 17 double-target mission. About half of those became prisoners of war of the Germans and 20 were interned in Switzerland. Sixty aircraft were lost over German-controlled territory, in Switzerland, or ditched at sea, with five crews rescued. Seven aircrew were killed aboard bombers returning to base having completed the mission, and twenty-one were wounded.

The 60 aircraft lost on a single mission more than doubled the highest previous loss at that time. Another 55 to 95 aircraft were badly damaged. Of those damaged, many were stranded in North Africa and never repaired. Three P-47 Thunderbolts of the 56th Fighter Group and two RAF Spitfires were shot down attempting to protect the Schweinfurt force.

Spitfire pilots claimed 13 German fighters shot down and P-47 pilots claimed 19. (Note: All break down the claims as 16 for the 56th FG, 2 for the 78th FG, and one for the 353rd FG.) (Note: Caldwell and Muller state 16 claims.) Gunners on the bombers claimed 288 fighters shot down, (Note: Freeman states that the gunners' claims were later reduced to 148, and that actual German loss was "only 27 fighters".) but Luftwaffe records showed only 25 to 27 were lost. Overclaiming, especially by bomber defensive gunners, was persistent throughout the war.

In Regensburg, all six main workshops of the Messerschmitt factory were destroyed or severely damaged, as were many supporting structures including the final assembly shop. In Schweinfurt, the destruction was less severe but still extensive. The two largest factories, Kugelfischer & Company and Vereinigte Kugellager Fabrik I, suffered 80 direct hits. 35,000 m^{2} (380,000 square feet) of buildings in the five factories were destroyed, and more than 100,000 m^{2} (1,000,000 square feet) suffered fire damage. All the factories except Kugelfischer had extensive fire damage to machinery when incendiaries ignited the machine oil used in the manufacturing process.

Albert Speer reported an immediate 34 percent loss of production, (Note: Miller puts the loss at 38%.) but both the production shortfall and the actual loss of bearings were made up for by extensive surpluses found throughout Germany in the aftermath of the raid. The industry's infrastructure, while vulnerable to a sustained campaign, was not vulnerable to destruction by a single raid. Speer indicated that the two major flaws made by the USAAF in the August strike were first in dividing their force instead of all striking the ball-bearing plants, and second, failing to follow up the first strike with repeated attacks.

203 civilians were also killed in the strike. (Note: According to Coffey: 70 men, 77 women, 48 children, and 8 foreign workers. Miller rounded the figure at 200.) While the battle resulted in a German victory, the scale and range of the American operation, along with the British-led Operation Hydra against the German rocket development site in the same day, shocked the German air command; the stress contributed to the suicide of the Chief of General Staff of the Luftwaffe Hans Jeschonnek the next day.

The Schweinfurt mission in particular foretold the failure of deep penetration raids of Germany without adequate long-range escort. The 1st Bomb Wing was over German-occupied territory for three hours and thirty minutes, of which two hours and ten minutes, including all of the time spent over Germany itself, saw no fighter support whatsoever. When the second attack on Schweinfurt came on October 14, the loss of more than 20% of the attacking force (60 out of 291 B-17s) resulted in the suspension of deep raids for five months.

== Legacy ==
The bombing of Regensberg was fictionalized and illustrated by Ludwig Bemelmans in The Blue Danube (New York, The Viking Press, 1945). Bemelmans tells the story of the bombing from the point of view of the people on the ground.

The mission was enshrined in fiction as the "Hambrucken raid" in Beirne Lay and Sy Bartlett's novel, Twelve O'Clock High. It provides a reasonably accurate view of the thinking behind the planners' intention and the decisions that led to the abandonment of the goal of launching a double strike in such a way that the second strike would meet no aerial opposition; and of the action in the air itself.

It is also cited as a failure of the Bomber Mafia's precision bombing doctrine, in the book by the same name by Canadian journalist Malcolm Gladwell.

The Schweinfurt portion of the mission also formed the framework for the novel The War Lover, by John Hersey.

In the early 1990s, the raid was depicted for the first time in a video game, as a playable mission in Secret Weapons of the Luftwaffe.

In February 2024, the raid was depicted in Episode 3 of Masters of the Air on Apple TV+.

== Bibliography ==
- Bishop, Cliff T. (1986). Fortresses of the Big Triangle First, ISBN 1-869987-00-4
- Bowman, Martin W.; Boiten, Theo (2001). Battles With The Luftwaffe: The Bomber Campaign Against Germany 1942–45. Harper Collins. ISBN 0-00-711363-3.
- Caldwell, Donald L.; Muller, Richard R. (2007). The Luftwaffe over Germany: Defense of the Reich. London: Greenhill Books. ISBN 978-1-85367-712-0.
- Coffey, Thomas M. (1977). Decision Over Schweinfurt. David McKay Company, Inc. ISBN 978-0-679-50763-5.
- De Cock, Jean-Pierre; Kit, Mister (1980). Bombardiers lourds de la dernière guerre : B-17, forteresse volante, Avro Lancaster, B-24 Liberator [Last World War Heavy Bombers: B-17, Flying Fortress, Avro Lancaster, B-24 Liberator] (in French). Editions Atlas. ISBN 978-2-7312-0031-7.
- Freeman, Roger A. (1990). The Mighty Eighth War Diary. Motorbooks International. ISBN 978-0-87938-495-1.
- Freeman, Roger A. (1993). The Mighty Eighth. Motorbooks International. ISBN 978-0-87938-638-2.
- Jablonski, Edward (1974). Double strike: the epic air raids on Regensburg-Schweinfurt, August 17. Doubleday. ISBN 0-385-07540-5.
- Miller, Donald L. (2006). Masters of the Air: America's Bomber Boys Who Fought the Air War Against Nazi Germany. Simon & Schuster. ISBN 0-7432-3544-4.
- Overy, Richard. (1995) Why the Allies won. W.W. Norton & Co. ISBN 978-0-393-31619-3
- Woods, Tony (20 September 2005). "Tony Wood's Combat Claims & Casualties Lists". Archived from the original on 2007-02-10. "These lists are my interpretations of "Allied Combats & Casualties" which were taken from the official RAF Fighter Command records held at PRO/Kew"
- Price, Alfred (2005). Battle over the Reich – The strategic air offensive over Germany. Hersham, Surrey: Classic Publications. ISBN 1-903223-47-4.
- Ramsey, John F (August 1945). The War Against the Luftwaffe: AAF Counter-Air Operations, April 1943 – June 1944 (PDF). USAF Historical Studies (Report). Air Force Historical Research Agency. Archived from the original (PDF) on 2012-09-02.
- Terdoslavich, William (2010). "Raids on Ploesti and Schweinfurt: August 1943 and October 1943". In Fawcett, Bill (ed.). How to Lose WWII: Bad Mistakes of the Good War. New York: HarperPaperbacks. ISBN 978-0-06-180731-2.
