= German and Allied aircraft losses during Operation Bodenplatte =

Losses during 1945 World War II action

Operation Bodenplatte (English: Operation Baseplate or Operation Ground Plate), launched on 1 January 1945, was an attempt by the Luftwaffe to cripple Allied air forces in the Low Countries during the final months of the Second World War. The Germans husbanded their resources in the preceding months at the expense of the units defending against the Allied strategic bombing in what was a last-ditch effort to keep up the momentum of the German Army (Heer) during the stagnant stage of the Battle of the Bulge (codenamed "Operation Watch on the Rhine" German: Unternehmen Wacht am Rhein).

This is a list of all known casualties during the course of the operation.

== Background ==
Despite the passage of time, there is still controversy regarding the extent of Allied losses. One author, Norman Franks, has pointed to what "some" historians call a "conspiracy to hide the true, unacceptable, total of aircraft destroyed". This theory has been aided in the conflicting totals quoted in official records and the apparent lack of detailed surviving reports. For example, some authors claim the Eindhoven airfield attack may have destroyed 141 Hawker Typhoons. RAF loss records refute this claim. Total figures give only 107 operational Typhoons; 17 were destroyed outright, nine damaged beyond repair, 10 badly damaged but repaired and 24 slightly damaged. In a more recent study, Fighter Command Losses of the Second World War: Volume 3, Operational Losses, Aircraft and Crews 1944–1945, the same author states that a report made by No. 85 Group RAF gave 127 operational aircraft destroyed and 133 damaged, while British personnel casualties were said to be 40 killed (11 pilots; six were killed in the air) and 145 wounded. In another report, dated 3 January 1945, losses were given as 120 destroyed and 73 damaged. 24 non-operational aircraft were also lost with 11 damaged. This included aircraft outside of RAF Second Tactical Air Force's control. The Air Force's losses were 73 destroyed and the same figure damaged, 12 non-operational aircraft destroyed and 11 damaged.

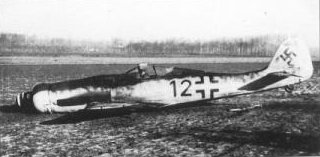
A Fw 190D-9 of 10./JG 54 Grünherz, pilot (Leutnant Theo Nibel), downed by a partridge which flew into the nose radiator near Brussels on 1 January 1945.

Werner Girbig in his book, Six Months to Oblivion: The Eclipse of the Luftwaffe Fighter Force, gives German losses, from their sources, as 137 destroyed (98 in the British sector and 39 in the American). Some 57 were shot down by Allied fighters and 80 by Allied anti-aircraft defences. Girbig notes a further 48 were lost to unknown causes making a total of around 200 fighters. The rest, the author attributes to German anti-aircraft fire ("flak"). His final total is given as 300. Girbig gives personnel losses as 151 pilots killed and 63 captured. Girbig gives Allied losses as roughly 500, including quoted figures according to Allied sources of 144 destroyed and 84 damaged for the RAF and 134 destroyed and 62 damaged for the USAAF. Girbig asserts that 65–75 were shot down in combat.

In recent years other authors have offered more detail on the losses of each side. John Manrho and Ronald Pütz, published their findings in Bodenplatte: The Luftwaffe's Last Hope. According to their figures, taken from German and Allied sources, which include the remains of German airmen found up until 2003, German casualties were 271 fighters destroyed, 65 single-engine fighters damaged and 9 twin-engine aircraft destroyed, and four damaged. Some 143 pilots were killed in action, 70 became prisoners of war and 21 were wounded in action. The Allies lost 305 aircraft destroyed and 190 aircraft damaged. A further 15 Allied aircraft were shot down and ten damaged. A further six were downed by other causes. Manrho and Pütz have also deduced that only 17 German aircraft are certain to have been shot down by German Flak. Even if aircraft with unknown fates are added, it still gives a figure of only 30–35. They state that the notion that one-third of the German aircraft were shot down by friendly fire is "myth".

Jochen Prien and Gerhard Stemmer in their book, Jagdgeschwader 3 "Udet" in World War II, quoted Allied losses as being 340 destroyed with 84 heavily damaged from Allied records. Tertiary histories give varying figures; anywhere between 250 and 500 Allied aircraft destroyed. Steven Zaloga gives figures of 214 German aircrew killed or captured and 304 aircraft destroyed. In return, Allied losses are put at 144 lost on the ground, 62 damaged and 70 lost in aerial combat.

== Loss statistics ==
=== Total Allied aerial losses ===
Allied aerial casualties directly related to Bodenplatte:

Name	Rank	Unit	Aircraft type	Fate	Cause
Howard P. Gibboms	Flight Lieutenant	168 Squadron RAF	Hawker Typhoon	KIA	shot down by JG 3 Fw 190s
Don Webber	Flying Officer	183 Squadron RAF	Hawker Typhoon	KIA	shot down in error by 352nd P-51
Wacław Chojnacki	Flight Lieutenant	308 Polish Fighter Squadron	Supermarine Spitfire	KIA	shot down by JG 1 Fw 190s
Stanisław Bednarczyk	Warrant Officer	308 Polish Fighter Squadron	Supermarine Spitfire	uninjured	shot down by JG 1 Fw 190s
Józef Stanowski	Flight Sergeant	308 Polish Fighter Squadron	Supermarine Spitfire	uninjured	ran out of fuel
Tadeusz Szlenkier	Flying Officer	308 Polish Fighter Squadron	Supermarine Spitfire	uninjured	ran out of fuel
Stanisław Breyner	Sergeant	308 Polish Fighter Squadron	Supermarine Spitfire	uninjured	ran out of fuel
Tadeusz Powierza	Sergeant	317 Polish Fighter Squadron	Supermarine Spitfire	KIA	shot down by JG 1 Fw 190s
Zenobiusz Wdowczyński	Warrant Officer	317 Polish Fighter Squadron	Supermarine Spitfire	uninjured	ran out of fuel
Czesław Mroczyk	Flight Lieutenant	317 Polish Fighter Squadron	Supermarine Spitfire	uninjured	shot down by JG 1 Fw 190s
L Rose	Sergeant	329 Squadron	Supermarine Spitfire	uninjured	engine trouble
David Harling	Flight Lieutenant	416 Squadron RCAF	Supermarine Spitfire	KIA	shot down by JG 26 Fw 190D-9
Peter Wilson	Flight Lieutenant	438 Squadron RCAF	Hawker Typhoon	KIA	shot down by JG 3 Fw 190D-9
Ross Keller	Flying Officer	438 Squadron	Hawker Typhoon	KIA	strafed and killed during take-off JG 3 Fw 190s
Hugh Fraser	Flying Officer	439 Squadron RCAF	Hawker Typhoon	uninjured	damaged by JG 6 Bf 109. Wheels up landing at Volkel airfield (after downing two German aircraft)
Samuel Angelini	Flying Officer	439 Squadron	Hawker Typhoon	KIA	shot down by JG 6
Len Wilson	Flying Officer	442 Squadron RCAF	Supermarine Spitfire	uninjured	shot down by JG 6
Don Gordon	Flight Lieutenant	442 Squadron	Supermarine Spitfire	WIA	shot down by JG 6
Donald Brigden	Flying Officer	442 Squadron	Supermarine Spitfire	KIA	shot down by JG 6
William Whisner	Captain	487 Fighter Squadron, 352 Fighter Group	North American P-51 Mustang	uninjured	After damage from JG 11 20 mm fire, Whisner destroyed two Bf 109s and two Fw 190s and made a "wheels down" landing
Dean Huston	First Lieutenant	487th Fighter Squadron, 352 Fighter Group	P-51 Mustang	uninjured	minor damage
James Hall	Second Lieutenant	366th Fighter Group	Republic P-47 Thunderbolt	uninjured	shot down by JG53 Bf 109
Dofel Brunetti	Second Lieutenant	366 Fighter Group	P-47 Thunderbolt	uninjured	shot down by JG53 Bf 109
William Schubert	First Lieutenant	367/358 Fighter Group	P-47 Thunderbolt	uninjured	shot down by JG53 Bf 109
David Johnson Jr	Flight Officer	366 Fighter Group	P-47 Thunderbolt	uninjured	shot down by JG11
John Feeney	First Lieutenant	366 Fighter Group	P-47 Thunderbolt	uninjured	shot down by JG11
John Kennedy	Second Lieutenant	390th Fighter Group	P-47 Thunderbolt	uninjured	shot down by JG11
D.K Neil; Other crew: Crew Sgt. Owen Stafford WIA; William Fletcher KIA	Lieutenant	125 Liaison Squadron	Stinson Vigilant	uninjured	shot down by JG4
Pilot and Observer	unknown	27th Field Artillery	Artillery Spotter	both KIA	shot down by JG53
Pilot and Observer	unknown	XX. Art Corps	Artillery Spotter	KIA	shot down by JG53
? Harvey	unknown	Air Despatch Letter Service Flight	Auster	uninjured	shot down by JG53 (bailed out)

=== Total German losses ===
German casualties related directly to Bodenplatte:

Unit	KIA or MIA	POW	wounded	Average number of aircraft deployed	Percentage of staff lost
I./JG 1	7	3			
II./JG 1	10	1	1		
III./JG 1	1	2			
	18	6	1	80	31%
Stab./JG 2		1			
I./JG 2	9	6	1		
II./JG 2	3	1	1	1	
III./JG 2	10	3	2		
	22	11	4	90	31%
I./JG 3	3	5			
III./JG 3	3		2		
IV./JG 3	4	1			
	10	6	2	70	26%
I./JG 4	3				
II./JG 4	8	3	1		
III./JG 4	1				
IV./JG 4	6	2			
	18	5	1	55	42%
Stab./JG 6		1			
I./JG 6	4	1	1		
II./JG 6	5	2			
III./JG 6	6	3			
	15	7	1	70	33%
Stab./JG 11	2				
I./JG 11	4				
II./JG 11	6	2			
III./JG 11	9	2			
	21	4		65	38%
I./JG 26	5	3	2		
II./JG 26	4	4	1		
III./JG 26	3	1	1		
	12	8	4	160	38%
I./JG 27	6	1			
II./JG 27	1	1			
III./JG 27	2		1		
IV./JG 27	2	1			
	11	3	1	85	18%
II./JG 53	5	2	1		
III./JG 53			2		
IV./JG 53	5	2	1		
	10	4	4	50	36%
III./JG 54	5	4	1	17	60%
IV./JG 54	2	1		25	12%
	7	5	1		
I./JG 77	2	1			
II./JG 77	1	1			
III./JG 77	3	3			
	6	5		105	10%
Est./JG 104		1		3	
Total (day fighters)	150	65	19	875	
Stab./SG 4	1				
III./SG 4	2	1			
	3	1			
FlüG 1	1				
NJG 1	9	2			
NJG 3	3	1			
NJG 101	1				
	14	3			
KG (J) 51	2				
Total (other units)	19	4			
Grand Total	169	69	19		

Jagdgeschwader 27 losses on 1 January 1945 numbered 18 pilots overall. Fifteen pilots were lost as a direct result of Bodenplatte.
