= Second Schweinfurt raid =

1943 World War II air battle

Second Schweinfurt raid (Eighth Air Force Mission 115)
- Part of Operation Pointblank
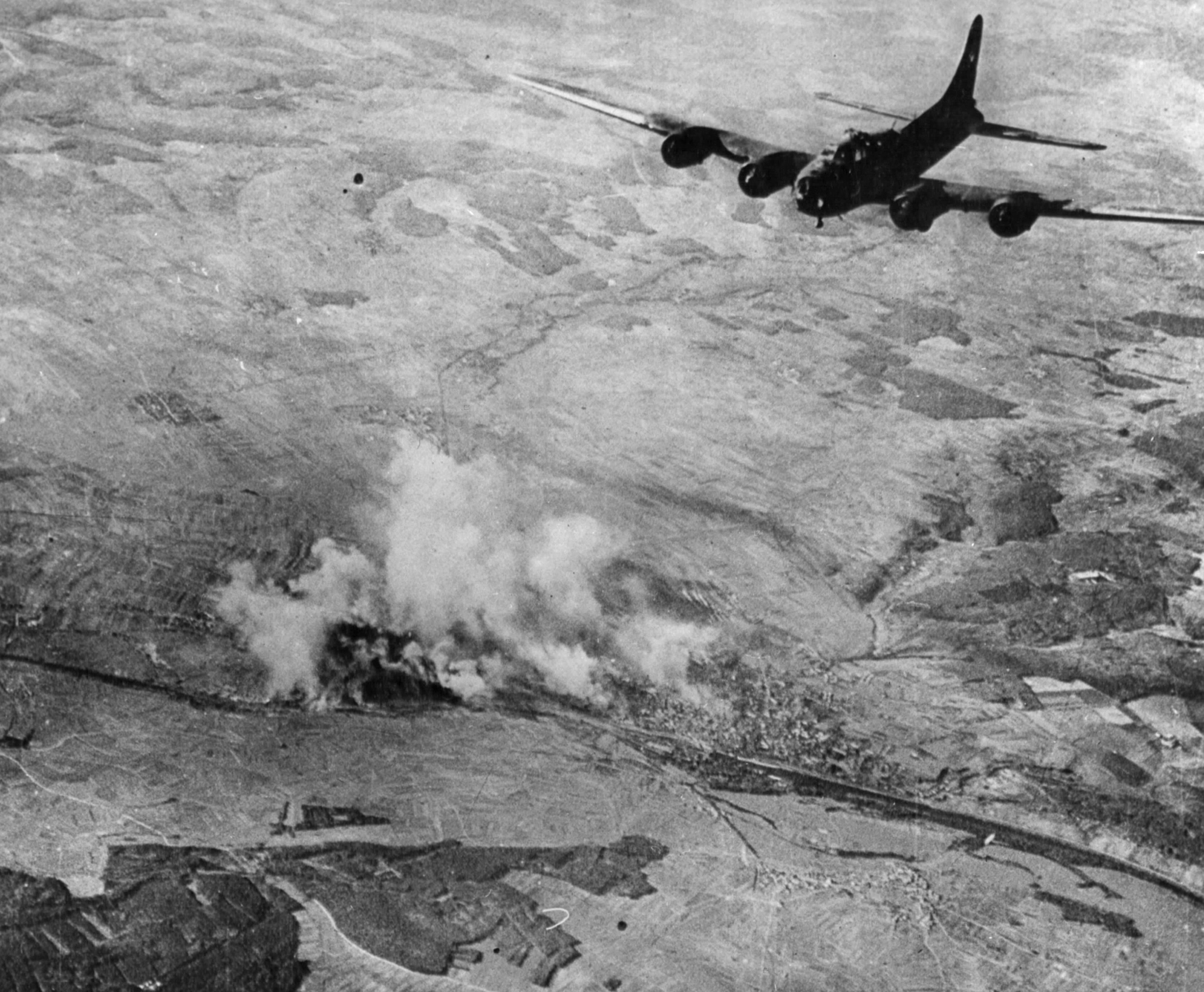
- A B-17 returning to England above Schweinfurt in flames
Date	14 October 1943
Location	Schweinfurt, Nazi Germany
Result	German victory

Belligerents
(United States) Eighth Air Force	(Nazi Germany) Luftwaffe

Units involved
1st Air Division: 91st, 92nd, 303rd, 305th, 306th, 351st, 379th, 381st and 384th BGs; 3rd Air Division: 94th, 95th, 96th, 100th, 385th, 388th and 390th BGs.	JGs 1, 3, 11, 25, 26, 27, 54

Strength
291 B-17 Flying Fortresses 60 B-24 Liberators (Note: 229 of 291 B-17s hit the city area and ball bearing plants at Schweinfurt, Germany in two group[s]; the first group bombs at 1439–1445 hours, the second group at 1451–1457 hours; they claim 186-27-89 Luftwaffe aircraft; 60 B-17s are lost, seven damaged beyond repair, and 138 damaged; casualties are five KIA, 40 WIA and 594 MIA.) (diverted)	

Casualties and losses
3 P-47 fighters 77 B-17s lost (Note: 59/1 downed/ditched + 5/12 crashed/scrapped); 121 damaged	35–38 Messerschmitt Bf 109s & Focke-Wulf Fw 190 lost 20 damaged

The second Schweinfurt raid, also called Black Thursday, was a World War II air battle that took place on 14 October 1943, over Nazi Germany between forces of the United States 8th Air Force and German Luftwaffe fighter arm (Jagdwaffe). The American bombers conducted a strategic bombing raid on ball bearing factories to reduce production of these vital parts used in all manner of war machines. This was the second attack on the factories at Schweinfurt. American wartime intelligence claimed the first Schweinfurt–Regensburg mission in August had reduced bearing production by 34 percent but had cost many bombers. A planned follow-up raid had to be postponed to rebuild American forces.

As the squadrons rebuilt, plans for the return mission were modified based on the lessons learned. Planners added additional fighter escorts to cover the outward and return legs of the operation and sent the entire force against Schweinfurt alone, instead of splitting the force. Despite these changes, a series of minor mishaps combined with the ever-increasing efficiency of the German anti-aircraft effort proved to be devastating. Of the 291 B-17 Flying Fortresses sent on the mission, 60 were lost, another 17 damaged so heavily that they had to be scrapped and another 121 had varying degrees of battle damage. Losses represented over 26 percent of the attacking force and losses in aircrew were equally severe, with 650 men lost of 2,900, 22 percent of the bomber crews. The American Official History of the Army Air Forces in the Second World War acknowledged losses had been so great that the USAAF would not return to the target for four months, "The fact was that the Eighth Air Force had for the time being lost air superiority over Germany".

The operation was a failure. The bomber formations were left exposed to attacks by German fighters and the faulty preparations for the creation of reserves in the summer of 1943 meant that such costly operations could not be sustained. An escort of 24 squadrons of Spitfires equipped with drop tanks was provided on the first and last leg of the mission.

The strategy of the Allied air forces was flawed. Arthur Harris, Air Officer Commanding RAF Bomber Command questioned the intelligence that claimed ball bearings to be vital to the German war economy. Harris refused to cooperate with the Americans, who believed ball bearing targets to be a "panacea". Post-war analysis has shown Harris's objections to be correct. The Germans had built up enormous reserves of ball bearings and were receiving supplies from all over Europe, particularly Italy, Sweden and Switzerland. The operation against these industries would, even if successful, have achieved little. By 1945, the Germans had assembled more reserves than ever.

== Background ==
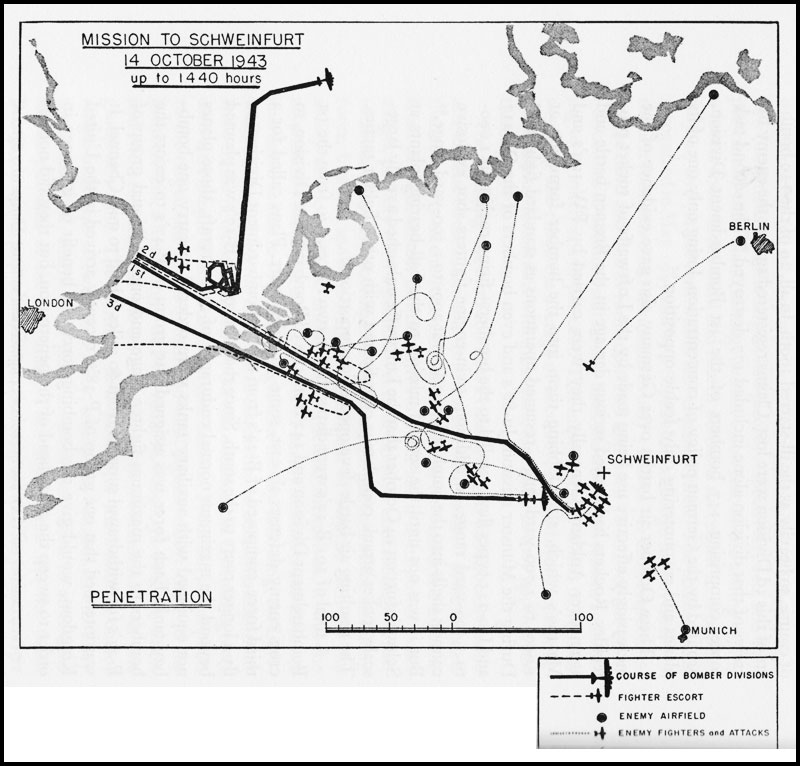
USAAF map of the flight to Schweinfurt

Factories in and around Schweinfurt accounted for a significant amount of German ball bearing production. The Kugelfischer plant produced 22 percent, the Vereinigte Kugellagerfabriken I and II produced 20 percent, and another one percent came from the Fichtel & Sachs factory. After the supposed German ball bearing "bottleneck" had been identified in 1942 and ball bearings had been named the second-most-vital Pointblank industry for the Combined Bomber Offensive in March 1943, Schweinfurt's ball bearing plants were selected for a second air raid after being bombed during the August Schweinfurt–Regensburg mission.

== Mission ==
Each of the three bomber wings was to be escorted by fighters from a group with several squadrons of P-47 Thunderbolts. The fighters were inexplicably not employing drop tanks which limited their escort range. One fighter outfit was diverted to escort a squadron of 29 B-24s that switched to a spoof mission to Emden because of the bad weather forecast. Some 229 of 291 B-17s hit the city area and ball bearing plants at Schweinfurt in two groups: the first group bombed at 14:39–14:45 hours, the second group at 14:51–14:57 hours. They claimed 186 Luftwaffe aircraft - more than four times the Germans' actual losses of 35–38 aircraft. Sixty B-17s were lost, two damaged beyond repair and 13 damaged; casualties amounted to five KIA, 40 WIA and 594 MIA.

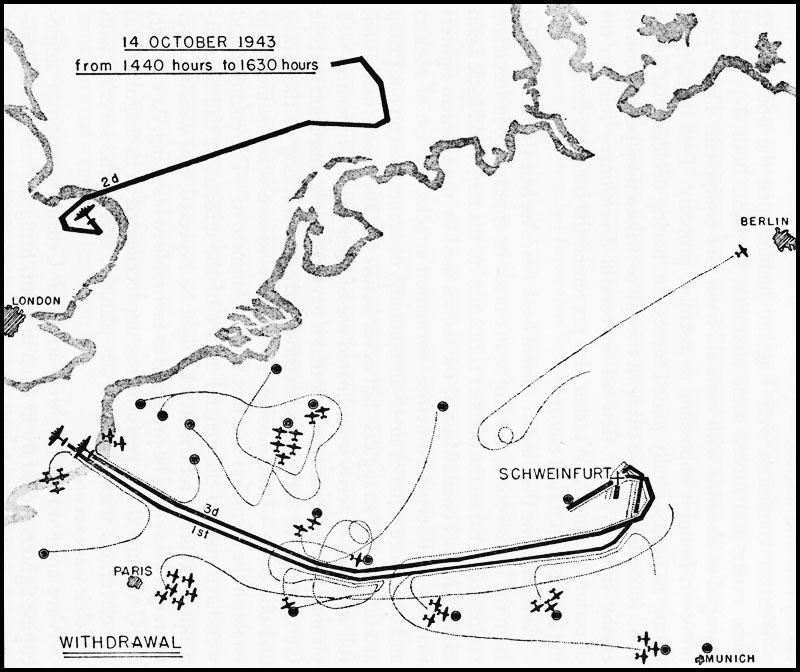
USAAF map of the withdrawal from Schweinfurt

The bomber formations were spread out and vulnerable because of bad weather. The Luftwaffe military intelligence officers had suspected a deep penetration air raid because of the substantial amount of bombers. Jagdgeschwader 3 Udet intercepted the bombers as they crossed the coast but P-47s shot down seven Bf 109s while losing just one P-47. A P-47 was also lost when it crashed at Herongate and another during a one-wheel landing at base. Over the Netherlands elements of two more "named" Luftwaffe fighter wings, JG 1 Oesau and JG 26 Schlageter made repeated attacks. The 305th Bomb Group lost 13 of its 16 B-17s in minutes. The B-17s were attacked after bombing by fighters that had refueled and rearmed (JG 11 shot down 18 B-17s).

Sixty bombers were shot down by German fighters and flak and 12 bombers were damaged so badly that they crashed upon return or had to be scrapped. Another 121 bombers returned with moderate damage. Of 2,900 crew, about 254 did not return (65 survived as prisoners-of-war), while five killed-in-action and 43 wounded were in the damaged aircraft that returned (594 were listed as missing-in-action). Among the most seriously affected American units was the 306th Bomb Group. It lost 100 men, 35 killed on the mission or died of wounds and 65 were captured. The 305th Bomb Group lost 130 men (87%), with 36 killed.

The defensive efforts of both JG 1 and JG 11 during the "Black Thursday" raid are said to have included substantial use of the BR 21 unguided stand-off rockets against the USAAF combat boxes, as both Luftwaffe fighter wings had been using the rockets for about six months.

== Aftermath ==
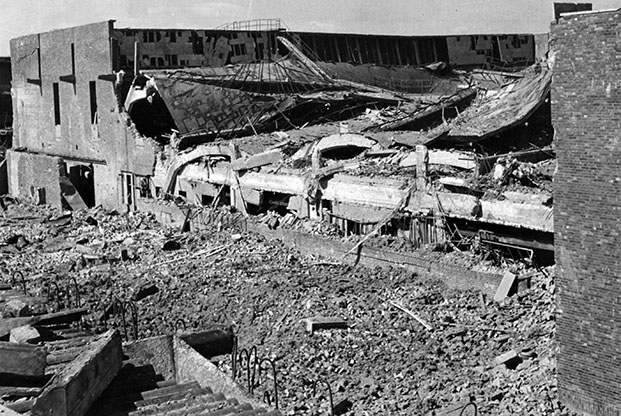
Destruction at Schweinfurt after 14 October 1943 raid

Although the Schweinfurt factories were badly hit, the mission failed to achieve any lasting effect. The production of ball bearings in the factories was halted for only 6 weeks and Germany's war industry could easily rely on its substantial inventory of ball bearings as well as a large production surplus. In addition, the ball bearing facilities were dispersed to reduce their bombing risk. Despite General Henry H. Arnold's claim that the Black Thursday "loss of 60 [downed/ditched] American bombers in the Schweinfurt raid was incidental", unescorted daylight bomber raids deep into Germany were suspended until the February 1944 Big Week missions with P-51B Mustang escorts that included additional Schweinfurt day/night USAAF/RAF bombing on 24 February.

Another example of the strategy of using heavy bombers against a particular wartime resource, the Oil Campaign of World War II was essentially started by RAF Bomber Command in August 1941 – two months after Hitler's invasion of the Soviet Union, and six months before the United States entered the war. It went forward relentlessly from that time with the USAAF joining in on the efforts by late June 1943 during daylight. The Oil Campaign had its priority diminished from time to time with important events, such as the lead-up to Operation Overlord, which by June 1944 demanded heavy bomber support for a time, but soon thereafter the relentless attacks by day and night resumed, starving the Wehrmacht of fuel and lubricants from the autumn of 1944.
