= Verification bias =

Type of measurement bias

In statistics, verification bias is a type of measurement bias in which the results of a diagnostic test affect whether the gold standard procedure is used to verify the test result. This type of bias is also known as "work-up bias" or "referral bias".

In clinical practice, verification bias is more likely to occur when a preliminary diagnostic test is negative. Because many gold standard tests can be invasive, expensive, and carry a higher risk (e.g. angiography, biopsy, surgery), patients and physicians may be more reluctant to undergo further work-up if a preliminary test is negative.

In cohort studies, obtaining a gold standard test on every patient may not always be ethical, practical, or cost effective. These studies can thus be subjected to verification bias. One method to limit verification bias in clinical studies is to perform gold standard testing in a random sample of study participants.

In most situations, verification bias introduces a sensitivity estimate that is too high and a specificity that is too low.
