= Wings (Canadian magazine) =

- Mar/April 2008 issue of Wings
- Group Publisher & VP Sales: Martin McAnulty
- Editor: Jon Robinson
- Categories: aviation, commercial aviation
- Frequency: 6 per year
- Publisher: Annex Business Media
- Country: Canada
- Language: Canadian English
- Website: www.WingsMagazine.com
- ISSN: 0701-1369

Wings is a bimonthly Canadian magazine that focuses on providing aviation news and business information for all sectors of the industry in Canada. Founded more than 65 years ago, Wings today is part of Annex Business Media, Canada’s largest B2B media company with more than 60 brands. Annex’ aviation group holds three sector specific brands, including Wings, Helicopters and UAV Canada. The aviation group also produces a range of annual resources such as the MRO Directory, Aerial Firefighting Directory and Careers in Aviation Guide. Annual events produced by the group include the Careers in Aviation Expo and Canadian Wildfire Conference, in addition to a range of webinars and other content platforms.
