= Tamerville V-1 site =

Planned Second World War V-1 site in Normandy, France

- Wasserwerk Valognes
- Part of the German V-weapons programme
- near Tamerville, Manche, Normandy, France
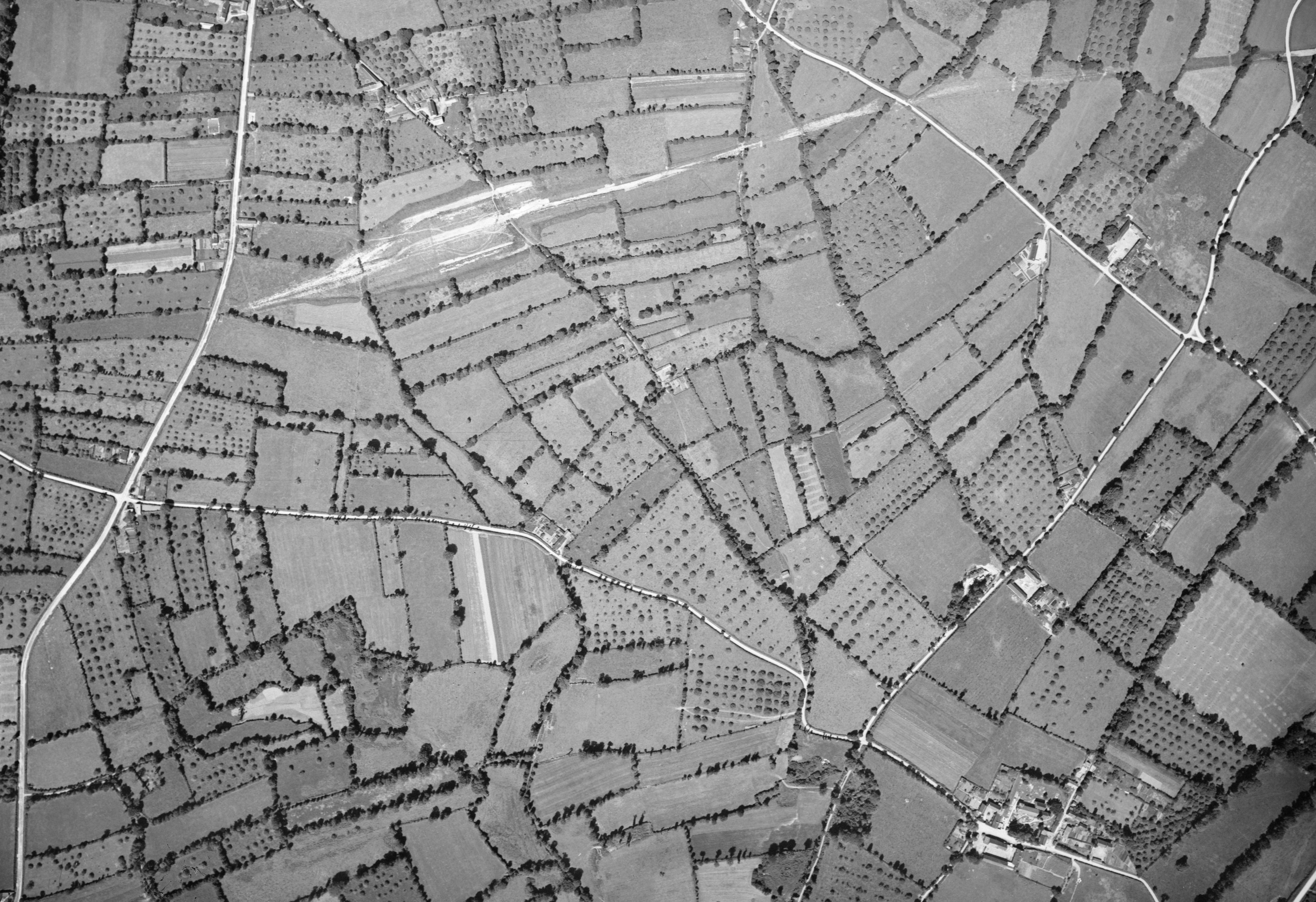
- Remains of the preparatory works for Wasserwerk Valognes, north of Tamerville, France (1947)

Site information
- Type: Planned fortified bunker complex; V-1 flying bomb storage, preparation and launch site
- Code: Wasserwerk Valognes; Wasserwerk Tamerville; Bauvorhaben B7
- Controlled by: Nazi Germany
- Condition: Fragmentary remains

Location
- Location within Normandy
- Coordinates: 49.54198°N 1.45762°W (Note: The coordinate marks the Tamerville–Croix du Val de Saire railway-work area associated with the planned Wasserwerk Valognes project in the IRSP railway inventory. It should not be treated as the confirmed centre of the planned bunker, whose exact position is not clearly identified in the available sources.)

Site history
- Built: 1943
- Built by: Organisation Todt
- In use: Never operational
- Materials: Reinforced concrete
- Battles/wars: Operation Crossbow
- Events: Identified by Allied reconnaissance in October 1943; Land requisition requested in November 1943; Work stopped before completion in 1944

The Tamerville V-1 site was a planned German V-1 flying bomb storage, preparation and launch site near Tamerville, close to Valognes, on the Cotentin Peninsula in Normandy, France. Its German cover name was Wasserwerk Valognes (lit. 'Valognes waterworks').

The project formed part of the Luftwaffe's early programme to build heavily fortified V-1 flying bomb launch installations for attacks against Britain. It was one of the original large Wasserwerk sites, alongside Wasserwerk Desvres at Lottinghen, Wasserwerk St. Pol at Siracourt and Wasserwerk Cherbourg at Couville. These installations were designed to centralise the storage, assembly, fuelling and launch of V-1 flying bombs within large reinforced-concrete bunkers protected against air attack.

Unlike Siracourt and Couville, the Tamerville project did not progress beyond preliminary works. The Organisation Todt requested the requisition of land at Tamerville on 19 November 1943 but the site was never completed and no V‑1 was launched from it. Little now remains of the project, apart from features associated to railway infrastructure built to supply the planned construction site.

== Background ==
Main German V-weapons heavy sites built or begun in France by the Organisation Todt from 1943 to 1944.

In 1943, Germany began developing a network of launch sites and support facilities for the V-1 flying bomb, a pilotless missile intended for attacks against London and southern England. The first generation of V-1 infrastructure included a small number of large, heavily protected sites known as Wasserwerke ("waterworks"). Early German plans envisaged up to ten such launch complexes. Four main Wasserwerk projects were initially undertaken: Wasserwerk Desvres at Lottinghen, Wasserwerk St. Pol at Siracourt, Wasserwerk Cherbourg at Couville and Wasserwerk Valognes at Tamerville. The Cotentin Peninsula was also used for other V-weapon projects, including the V-2 storage and maintenance bunker at Sottevast and the later V-1 installation at Brécourt.

Large fixed V-weapon sites were vulnerable to Allied aerial reconnaissance and bombing. Following attacks on exposed construction works at Watten, Couville and other sites, the German V-weapon programme increasingly shifted away from conspicuous bunker projects towards smaller, dispersed and better-camouflaged launch sites.

== Location and naming ==
The name Wasserwerk Valognes referred to the nearby, larger and better-known town of Valognes, while the actual worksite was at Tamerville. Some secondary sources use the name Wasserwerk Tamerville, while other sources identify the same project as Wasserwerk Valognes B7 or Bauvorhaben B7.

The exact location of the planned main bunker is uncertain. The project was located near Tamerville, about 3 km (1.9 mi) from Valognes, in the Manche department of Normandy. The most precise surviving locational evidence is the construction of a branch line from the Valognes–Barfleur railway, that circumvented Tamerville and an unfinished turning arrangement at La Biaiserie.

The site should be distinguished from the V-1 reception and distribution centres in the Valognes area built to serve Cherbourg launches. The installations V1 Versorgungsstelle 1008 at Valognes–La Tuilerie and V1 Versorgungsstelle 1009 at Bricquebec–La Lucerine-du-Bas were intended to receive, assemble and distribute V-1 flying bombs to supply smaller launch sites. The site known as "La Tuilerie", located near the Valognes rail yard, site reportedly consisted of ten assembly workshops, in addition to eleven other buildings of various types, all of which were connected by concrete paths.

== Design and construction ==
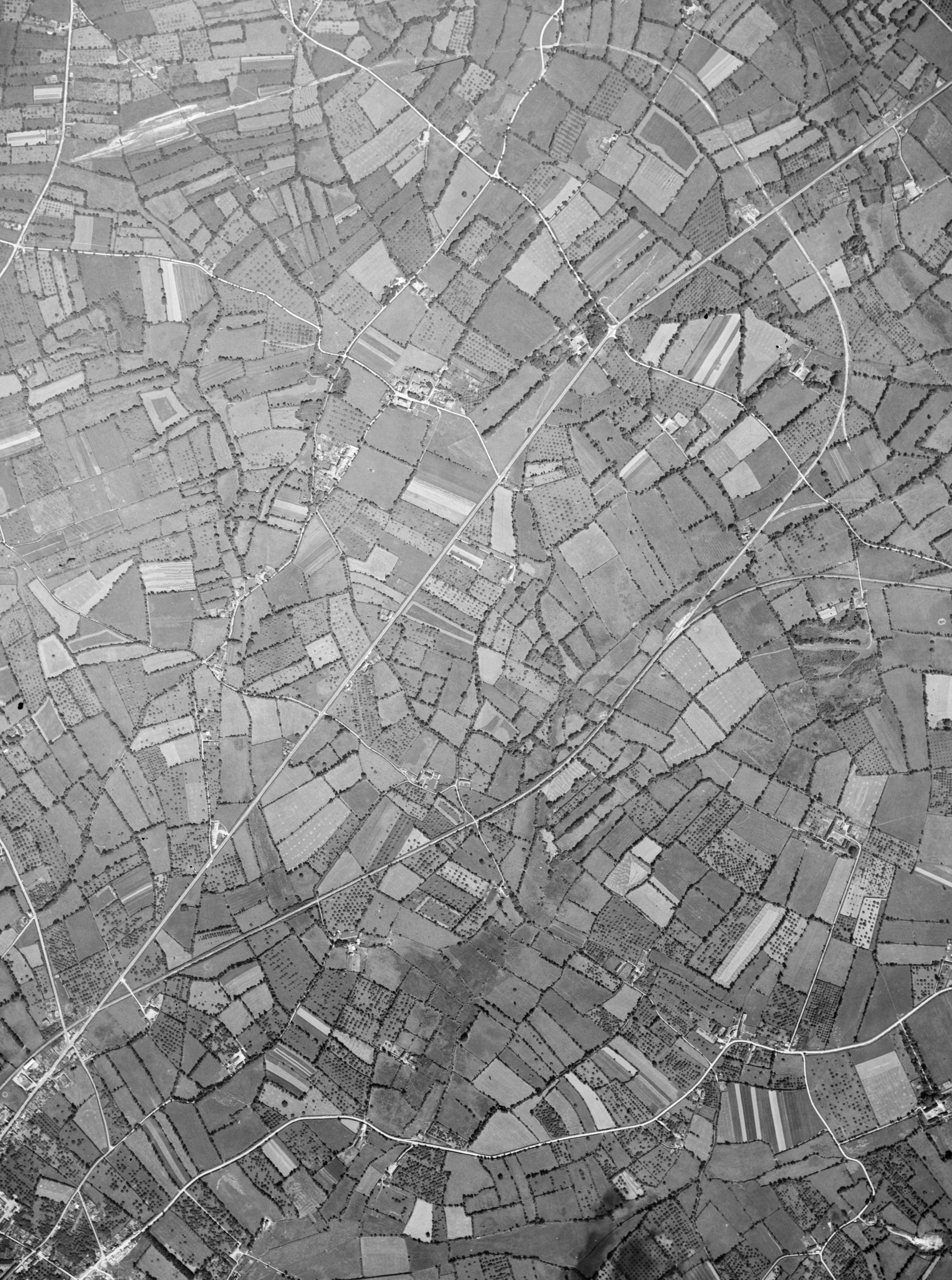
Remains of the branch line of the Valognes–Saint-Vaast-la-Hougue railway around Tamerville in 1947, built by the Organisation Todt to supply the planned Wasserwerk Valognes.

Wasserwerk Valognes was planned as a reinforced-concrete V-1 flying bomb storage, preparation and launch complex. The exact final design of Wasserwerk Valognes is uncertain. It appears to have been intended as a sister site to Wasserwerk Couville. Like the other early Wasserwerk projects, it would have centralised several operational functions within one protected structure: receiving V-1 flying bombs, storing them, completing preparation and fuelling, and launching them from protected infrastructure.

The Organisation Todt, which was responsible for many large German military engineering projects in occupied France, requested the requisition of land at Tamerville on 19 November 1943 and began preparatory work. The planned construction method appears to have followed the roof-first technique used at other German heavy bunker projects. This method, often described as Verbunkerung or Erdschalung. For similar heavily fortified V-1 flying bomb launch installations, it involved casting a massive reinforced-concrete roof before excavating beneath it and an estimated total of 135,000 m^{3} (4,800,000 cu ft) of concrete. Railway access was planned but only partly executed. A station and part of the branch line were built to connect the site with the Valognes–Saint-Vaast-la-Hougue railway. The existing railway was reinforced over a distance of approximately 3 km (1.9 mi) from 29 July 1943.

== Allied discovery and abandonment ==
Allied aerial reconnaissance and photographic interpretation played a central role in identifying and destroying German V-weapon sites in northern France. Large fixed sites were particularly exposed because their construction work, railway access and logistical preparations were difficult to conceal.

The Tamerville site was discovered by Allied reconnaissance on 30 October 1943. The discovery placed it within the wider Allied intelligence picture of "heavy" Crossbow installations, alongside other heavy V-weapon sites.

Tamerville is not documented as having undergone a bombing campaign like Couville, Siracourt or Lottinghen. After the severe damage inflicted on Couville in November 1943, the usefulness of continuing the Wasserwerk project at Tamerville appears to have been reconsidered. After Erwin Rommel inspected the Atlantic Wall in the Cotentin in December 1943, work at Tamerville was stopped. The planned Wasserwerk Valognes was very close to the command post of the 709th Infantry Division defending this sector. Army commanders pressed Organisation Todt to divert resources to the coastal defences and to Siracourt and Couville, with the intention that the less advanced sites could be resumed later. The site was consequently treated as a reserve launch position and was not further developed as a heavy Wasserwerk bunker. No V-1 flying bombs were launched from Tamerville.

By the time the V-1 flying bomb offensive against Britain began in June 1944, German launch operations relied chiefly on smaller and more dispersed launch sites rather than the early Wasserwerk complexes.

Nothing substantial remains of the site today, apart from a water reservoir associated with the wartime construction works.

== See also ==
- V-1 flying bomb facilities
- Operation Crossbow
- Organisation Todt

== Bibliography ==
- "Le Wasserwerk". À la découverte des vestiges des Armes allemandes (in French). 12 July 2017.
- Collier, Basil (1976) [1964]. The Battle of the V-Weapons, 1944–1945. Yorkshire: Emfield Press. ISBN 0-7057-0070-4.
- Delefosse, Yannick (July 2005). Gratianne, J.M. (ed.). "Les bases de V1" (PDF). On ne passe pas Magazine (in French).
- Gruen, Adam L. (1998). Preemptive Defense: Allied Air Power Versus Hitler's V-Weapons, 1943–1945 (PDF). The U.S. Army Air Forces in World War II. Washington, D.C.: Air Force History and Museums Program.
- Hautefeuille, Roland (1995). Constructions spéciales : histoire de la construction par l'Organisation Todt, dans le Pas-de-Calais et le Cotentin, des neuf grands sites protégés pour le tir des V1, V2, V3 et la production d'oxygène liquide, 1943–1944 (in French) (2nd ed.). Paris: Cerin. ISBN 2-9500899-0-9.
- Henshall, Philip (2002). Hitler's V-Weapon Sites. Stroud: Sutton Publishing. ISBN 978-0-7509-2607-2.
- Manche – Bases de lancement V1-V2 IRSP n°50000.1 (PDF) (Report) (in French). Inventaire des Réseaux Spéciaux et Particuliers. 3 July 2023.
- Braun, Alexander (2013). "V1-3". Normandie 1944 (in German).
- Sanders, Terence R. B. (1945). Investigation of the "Heavy" Crossbow Installations in Northern France (Report). Crossbow Committee.
- "Site spécial de Tamerville : Wasserwerk Valognes Bauwerk – B 7". Voyage au pays du V1 (in French). Archived from the original on 22 January 2009.
- Williams, Allan (2013). Operation Crossbow: The Untold Story of Photographic Intelligence and the Search for Hitler's V Weapons. London: Preface Publishing. ISBN 978-1-84794-654-6.
- Zaloga, Steven J. (2005). V-1 Flying Bomb 1942–52: Hitler's Infamous "Doodlebug". Oxford: Osprey Publishing. ISBN 1-84176-791-3.
- Zaloga, Steven J. (2008). German V-Weapon Sites 1943–45. Fortress. Oxford: Osprey Publishing. ISBN 978-1-84603-247-9.
