= Couville V-1 site =

Unfinished Second World War V-1 launch and preparation complex in Normandy, France

- Wasserwerk Cherbourg
- Part of V-weapons programme
- Couville, Manche, Normandy, France
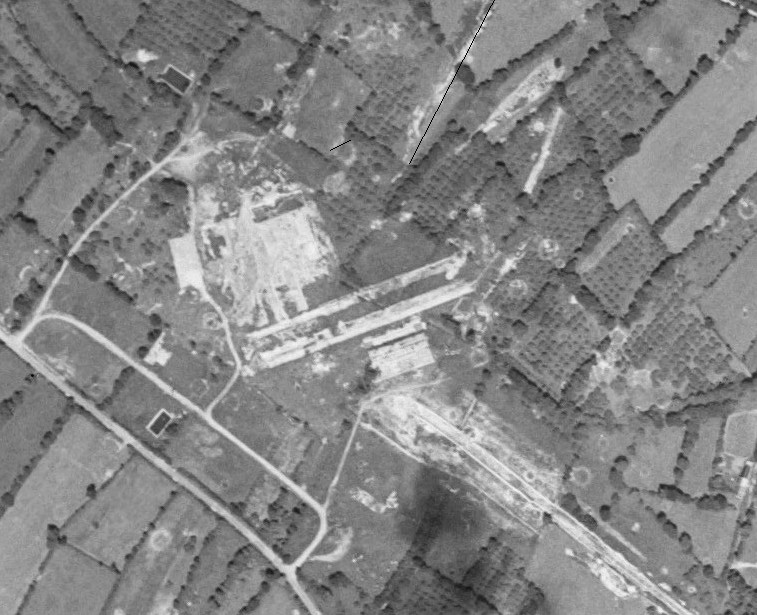
- Aerial photograph of the remains of the V-1 launch site Wasserwerk Cherbourg taken in 1947

Site information
- Type: V-1 flying bomb launch and preparation complex
- Code: Wasserwerk Cherbourg; Wasserwerk B8; Martinvast V-1 site (Note: The 387th Bombardment Group mission list records a target named "Martinvast V-1 site" on 11 November 1943. French sources describing the Couville works identify the principal raid on Wasserwerk Cherbourg B8 as having taken place on the same date. Since Couville lies close to Martinvast, historians generally treat the Allied designation as referring to the Couville installation.)
- Owner: Private
- Controlled by: Nazi Germany
- Open to the public: No
- Condition: Ruins

Location
- Location within Normandy
- Coordinates: 49°34′5.4″N 1°41′25.99″W

Site history
- Built: 1943
- Built by: Organisation Todt
- In use: Never operational
- Materials: Reinforced concrete
- Battles/wars: Operation Crossbow
- Events: Bombed 11 November 1943; Abandoned in early 1944

The Couville V-1 site was an unfinished German V-1 flying bomb launch and preparation complex constructed near Couville, close to Cherbourg, in Normandy, France. Its German codename was Wasserwerk Cherbourg (lit. 'Cherbourg waterworks'). The site formed part of the Luftwaffe’s early programme to build heavily fortified V-1 launching facilities intended to support sustained bombardment of southern England. These installations were designed to centralise the storage, assembly, fuelling, and launch of V-1 flying bombs within large reinforced-concrete bunkers protected against air attack.

Construction of the Couville complex began in mid-1943 under the supervision of the Organisation Todt as one of several major Wasserwerk sites, alongside facilities at Siracourt, Lottinghen, Tamerville, and nearby Brécourt. The concept of large, fixed installations was soon undermined by improved Allied aerial reconnaissance and the subsequent Operation Crossbow bombing campaign. Following heavy air attacks on V-weapon sites in northern France during 1943, German engineers revised construction methods and partially redesigned the works. The Couville site suffered significant bomb damage on 11 November 1943 and was abandoned before completion. No V-1 launches were conducted from the site prior to the Allied liberation of Normandy in 1944.

Today, only fragmentary remains of the partially completed works survive.

== Background ==
List of the main German V-weapons heavy sites built in France by the Organization Todt from 1943 to 1944.

In 1943, the German military started to develop an extensive network of heavily fortified facilities for launching V-1 flying bombs for attacks against London and southern England.

Early plans envisaged up to 10 launch complexes capable of storing, assembling, fuelling in reinforced-concrete bunkers and launching large numbers of V-1 flying bombs. These installations represented the first generation of V-1 infrastructure, later superseded by dispersed "ski sites" and mobile launch systems following Allied bombing. The original plan was to have the four Wasserwerke operational by the end of December 1943 and four additional sites by March 1944.

The Cotentin Peninsula was selected because of its proximity to England and its railway connections with Cherbourg and Paris. Only four principal "Wasserwerk" sites were initiated. Two were located in the Calais–Somme area (Siracourt and Lottinghen) and two were located on the Cotentin peninsula (Couville, Tamerville). These large installations were codenamed Wasserwerk ("waterworks") by the Luftwaffe: Wasserwerk Desvres (Lottinghen), Wasserwerk St. Pol (Siracourt), Wasserwerk Valognes (Tamerville) and Wasserwerk Cherbourg (Couville). The Couville works were connected to a temporary wartime railway network that was built to supply the different construction sites with building materials and to support their future operations.

These heavily protected sites were later identified by Allied intelligence as "heavy" Crossbow installations. Large fixed V-weapon installations were highly vulnerable to sustained Allied aerial attack. The strategic concept behind the heavy sites was progressively undermined by Allied air superiority during 1943. Following the destruction of exposed construction works at Watten, La Coupole and other V-weapon sites, German engineers increasingly abandoned large visible fortified structures in favour of smaller, more dispersed and better-camouflaged launch sites.

In March 1944, in response to a shortage of large launch bunkers, the Luftwaffe revived the proposed Ölkeller at Cherbourg, which had originally been intended for V-2 storage, and redesignated it Wasserwerk Nr. 2. The Brécourt site, codenamed Minenlager or Ersatz B8, was thus conceived as a replacement for the failed Waterworks B8.

== Design ==
The Couville complex was planned as a heavily protected reinforced-concrete structure intended to centralise all phases of V-1 preparation and launching. The principal bunker was designed to measure approximately 178 m (584 ft) long by 36 m (118 ft) wide, with a roof approximately 5 m (16 ft) thick. Two launch ramps were planned within the complex, consistent with the standard layout adopted for all four Wasserwerk sites.

Like other German "heavy" V-weapon sites, Couville was intended to protect personnel and equipment from Allied air attack while allowing sustained launch operations. The installation was designed to include storage areas, assembly facilities, fuelling equipment and launch infrastructure within a single protected complex.

Aerial photograph of the remains of the V-1 launch site Wasserwerk Cherbourg next the extensive marshalling yard at Couville (1947)

The site also required extensive rail infrastructure to transport construction materials and supplies during operation. Such rail infrastructure was essential to the Wasserwerk concept, which depended on bulk delivery of prefabricated components, fuel, and warheads. Several temporary railway branches were built to supply materials to the construction site. A major marshalling yard was also established at Couville station on the Paris–Cherbourg main line, situated between the now-closed stations at Sottevast and Martinvast. Five separate railway sections associated with the Couville V-1 site were built between 1943 and 1944. The railway earthworks remained visible on aerial photographs taken in March 1947. By the early 21st century, much of the former railway zone had disappeared or had become overgrown.

== Construction ==
Construction began in June 1943 under the supervision of the Organisation Todt. Initial works concentrated on rail access, excavation and preparation of the foundations. Contemporary estimations anticipated the use of approximately 135,000 m^{3} (4,800,000 cu ft) of concrete before October 1943.

During the summer of 1943, Allied bombing severely damaged major V-weapon construction projects in northern France, particularly the bunker at Watten. In response, German engineers adopted revised construction methods known as Verbunkerung, in which the reinforced-concrete roof slab was cast at ground level before excavation proceeded beneath it.

At Couville, the original construction area was partly abandoned and a revised worksite was established nearby. The new works began with two parallel trenches approximately 210 m (690 ft) long and about 30 m (98 ft) apart, defining the future bunker structure. The final layout of the site is not known. The remaining structures are two parallel walls approximately 155 m (509 ft) long, 1.3 m (4.3 ft) thick and about 8.5 m (28 ft) apart.

The redesign of the Couville works reflected broader German attempts to adapt V-weapon construction to Allied air superiority during Operation Crossbow. Despite these measures, the site remained vulnerable to repeated aerial bombardment.

== Allied bombing ==
The Couville installation became a target during Operation Crossbow, the Allied campaign against German V-weapon sites. Allied intelligence and mission reports frequently referred to the site as "Martinvast", reflecting nearby rail and administrative geography rather than the precise construction location. The site was first reported on 22 October 1943. On 11 November 1943, Allied bombers attacked the site in extensive raids conducted against the Cotentin V-weapon facilities. 157 medium bombers of the Ninth US Air Force dropped around 290 t (320 short tons) of bombs on the site and surrounding area. The raid reportedly damaged about 30 per cent of the construction works. German military records noted that two soldiers were wounded; civilian casualties in the surrounding communes were reported at approximately 25 dead.

Although construction could have resumed, German authorities abandoned the project soon after the November raid. To conceal the abandonment and draw Allied bombing away from more discreet launch facilities elsewhere in the Cotentin, visible activity and an anti-aircraft battery was deliberately maintained at the site. Eight additional small bombing raids by the RAF and USAAF struck Couville between 25 November 1943 and 21 January 1944, after the Germans had already ceased all serious construction work there.

The Luftwaffe subsequently transferred its efforts to the Brécourt site as a replacement for Couville and adopted the principle of dispersed mobile launch ramps that could be deployed on small concrete platforms scattered across the countryside, as well as mobile launch systems requiring less permanent infrastructure.

== Operational status ==
No V-1 launch operations were conducted from Couville before the Allied liberation of Normandy in 1944.

The failure of the site reflected a wider problem for the early heavy V-weapon installations. Large heavily-fortified sites offered theoretical protection but were difficult to conceal from aerial reconnaissance and required lengthy construction periods. By the time the V-1 flying bomb campaign began against Britain in June 1944, German launch operations relied chiefly on smaller, more dispersed and better-camouflaged launch sites rather than the large Wasserwerk complexes.

== Present condition ==
After the war, the former construction area returned largely to agricultural use but remained visible in aerial photography until the 1960s. Remains of the unfinished bunker and railway works survive in an overgrown condition near the D22 road at La Lande. The surviving concrete structures are heavily damaged and are located on private land.

== See also ==
- V-1 flying bomb facilities
- Operation Crossbow
- Operation Overlord
- Siracourt V-1 bunker
- Brécourt
- Sottevast V-2 bunker
- La Coupole

== Bibliography ==
- "387th Bombardment Group (Medium): Combat Missions". 387th Bombardment Group (Medium).
- "Le Wasserwerk". A la découverte des vestiges des Armes allemandes (in French). 12 July 2017.
- Carter, Kit C.; Mueller, Robert (1991). U.S. Army Air Forces in World War II: Combat Chronology 1941–1945 (PDF). Washington, D.C.: Center for Air Force History.
- Collier, Basil (1976) [1964]. The Battle of the V-Weapons, 1944–1945. Yorkshire: Emfield Press. ISBN 0-7057-0070-4.
- Gruen, Adam L. (1998). Preemptive Defense: Allied Air Power Versus Hitler's V-Weapons, 1943–1945. Washington, D.C.: Air Force History and Museums Program. ISBN 978-0-16-049671-4.
- Hautefeuille, Roland (1995). Constructions spéciales : histoire de la construction par l'Organisation Todt, dans le Pas-de-Calais et le Cotentin, des neufs grands sites protégés pour le tir des V1, V2, V3 et la production d'oxygène liquide, 1943–1944 (in French) (2nd ed.). Paris: Cerin. ISBN 2-9500899-0-9.
- Henshall, Philip (2002). Hitler's V-Weapons and Their Launching Sites. Stroud: Sutton Publishing. ISBN 978-0-7509-2607-2.
- Manche – Bases de lancement V1-V2 IRSP n°50000.1 (PDF) (Report) (in French). Inventaire des Réseaux Spéciaux et Particuliers. 3 July 2023.
- "Les sites de lancement de V1/V2 du Cotentin". Cicatrices de Guerre (in French). 15 September 2017.
- McNab, Chris (2014). Hitler's fortresses: German fortifications and defences 1939–45. Oxford: Osprey Publishing. ISBN 978-1-78200-828-6.
- "Wasserwerk Couville". NormandyBunkers.
- Sanders, Terence R. B. (1944). Investigation of the "Heavy" Crossbow Installations in Northern France (Report). Crossbow Committee.
- "Les sites lourds : Wasserwerk Cherbourg, Couville". Voyage au pays du V1 (in French).
- "Site V1 de Couville". Wikimanche (in French).
- "Site de Brécourt (Équeurdreville-Hainneville)". Wikimanche (in French).
- "Gare de Couville". Wikimanche (in French).
- Williams, Allan (2013). Operation Crossbow: The Untold Story of Photographic Intelligence and the Search for Hitler's V Weapons. Random House. ISBN 978-1-84794-654-6.
- Zaloga, Steven J. (2008). German V-Weapon Sites 1943–45. Fortress. Oxford: Osprey Publishing. ISBN 978-1-84603-247-9.
- Zaloga, Steven J. (2005). V-1 Flying Bomb 1942–52: Hitler's Infamous "Doodlebug". Oxford: Osprey Publishing. ISBN 1-84176-791-3.
- Zaloga, Steven J. (2018). Operation Crossbow 1944: Hunting Hitler's V-weapons. Bloomsbury Publishing. ISBN 978-1-4728-2615-2.
