= Desvres V-1 site =

Unfinished Second World War V-1 launch site in Pas-de-Calais, France

- Wasserwerk Desvres
- Part of the German V-weapons programme
- near Lottinghen, Pas-de-Calais, Hauts-de-France, France
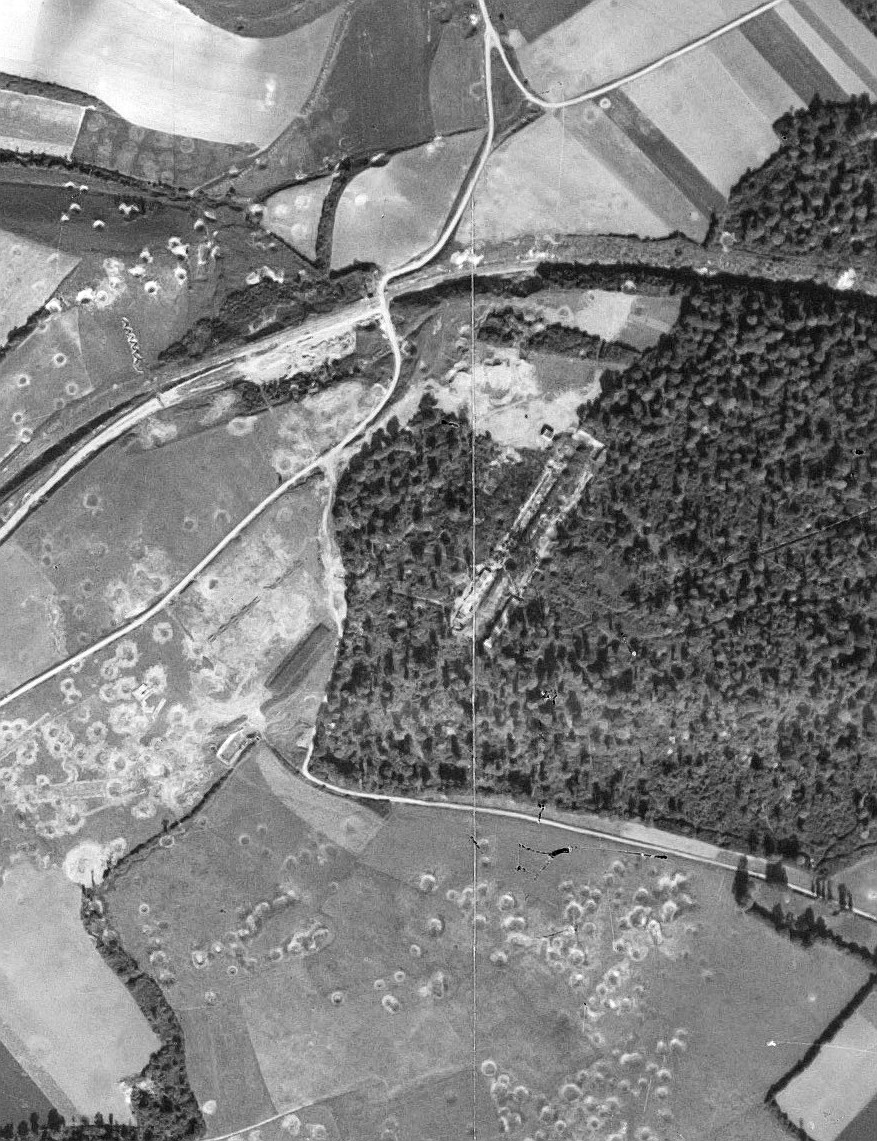
- Aerial photograph of the remains of the V-1 launch site Wasserwerk Desvres taken in 1947

Site information
- Type: Unfinished fortified bunker complex; V-1 flying bomb storage, preparation and launch site
- Code: Wasserwerk Desvres; Lottinghen (Note: The modern commune name is Lottinghen, but the spelling "Lottinghem" appears in some wartime and post-war English-language sources.) (Note: United States Army Air Forces records used the target name "Lottinghen/Les Grands Bois" for a V-weapon site attacked on 13 March 1944.)
- Owner: Private
- Controlled by: Nazi Germany
- Open to the public: No
- Condition: Ruins

Location
- Location in Hauts-de-France
- Coordinates: 50°40′48.67″N 1°57′58.68″E

Site history
- Built: 1943–1944
- Built by: Organisation Todt
- In use: Never operational
- Materials: Reinforced concrete
- Battles/wars: Operation Crossbow
- Events: Reported by Allied photographic intelligence in November 1943; Bombed from February to April 1944; Abandoned before completion

The Desvres V-1 site was an unfinished German V-1 flying bomb launch and preparation complex constructed near Lottinghen in the Pas-de-Calais department of northern France. Its German codename was Wasserwerk Desvres (lit. 'Desvres waterworks'), although the construction site itself was near Lottinghen, about 7 km (4.3 mi) east or north-east of Desvres.

The site formed part of the Luftwaffe's early programme to build heavily fortified V-1 launching facilities intended to support sustained bombardment of London and southern England. These installations were designed to centralise the storage, assembly, fuelling and launch of V-1 flying bombs within large reinforced-concrete bunkers protected against air attack.

Construction of the Lottinghen complex began in August 1943 under the supervision of the Organisation Todt, as one of several major Wasserwerk sites alongside facilities at Siracourt, Couville, Tamerville and Brécourt. The concept of large, fixed installations was soon undermined by improved Allied aerial reconnaissance and the subsequent Operation Crossbow bombing campaign. Wasserwerk Desvres was reported by Allied photographic intelligence in November 1943 and was bombed repeatedly from February to April 1944. The roof of the main bunker was still unfinished when the first raid took place. Construction had stopped by the time of the final raid on 30 April 1944. No V-1 flying bombs were launched from the site before the Allied liberation of northern France in 1944.

Today, only fragmentary remains of the partially completed works survive in the woodland of Les Grands Bois near Lottinghen.

== Background ==
Main German V-weapons heavy sites built or begun in France by the Organisation Todt from 1943 to 1944.

In 1943, the German military began to develop an extensive network of heavily fortified facilities for launching V-1 flying bombs against London and southern England. These large installations were codenamed Wasserwerk ("waterworks") by the Luftwaffe.

Early plans envisaged up to ten large launch complexes capable of storing, assembling, fuelling and launching large numbers of V-1 flying bombs from reinforced-concrete bunkers. These installations represented the first generation of V-1 infrastructure, later superseded by smaller, dispersed and better-camouflaged launch ramps and by mobile or semi-mobile launch systems following Allied bombing.

The original plan was to have four Wasserwerke operational by the end of December 1943 and four additional sites by March 1944. The first heavy V-1 bunker sites were Wasserwerk Desvres near Lottinghen and Wasserwerk St. Pol near Siracourt, both in the Artois region of northern France. Lottinghen already had developed local industrial and railway infrastructure, and the local cement plant Delattre et Cie was capable of directly supplying cement for the site's construction.

Further Wasserwerk sites were begun or planned on the Cotentin Peninsula, including Wasserwerk Valognes near Tamerville and Wasserwerk Cherbourg at Couville. The Pas-de-Calais sites were well placed for attacks against Britain and were close to established rail and industrial infrastructure, which was necessary for moving construction materials, V-1 flying bombs, fuel and technical equipment.

These heavily protected sites were later identified by Allied intelligence as "heavy" Crossbow installations. Large fixed V-weapon installations were highly vulnerable to sustained Allied aerial attack. The strategic concept behind the heavy sites was progressively undermined by Allied air superiority during 1943 and 1944. Following attacks on exposed construction works at Watten, Wizernes, Siracourt, Lottinghen and other V-weapon sites, the progressive abandonment of Wasserwerk sites before operational use was part of a broader shift away from conspicuous fortified V-1 complexes towards smaller, dispersed launch sites that were harder to detect and attack.

== Location and naming ==
The name Wasserwerk Desvres referred to Desvres, the nearest larger settlement, rather than to the exact site of construction. The site is located near Lottinghen, close to Seninghem, about 7 km (4.3 mi) east or north-east of Desvres and about 32 km (20 mi) inland from Boulogne-sur-Mer. Allied and later English-language sources sometimes used the spelling "Lottinghem", although the modern commune name is Lottinghen.

== Design and construction ==
Wasserwerk Desvres was planned as a large reinforced-concrete V-1 flying bomb storage, preparation and launch complex. It belonged to the early generation of heavy Wasserwerk sites designed to centralise the receiving, storage, assembly, fuelling and launching of V-1 flying bombs within a protected bunker complex. Construction began in August 1943 under the supervision of the Organisation Todt, which was responsible for many large German military engineering projects in occupied France. The workforce associated with the project reached about 5,000 workers at the end of 1943. Work at Lottinghen started later than at Siracourt and remained at an early stage when the site was abandoned.

The site was deliberately located in woodland known as Les Grands Bois, close to the Lumbres–Hesdigneul-lès-Boulogne railway, where only the minimum number of trees was cut down to allow excavations while the remainder were retained for camouflage. The construction method appears to have followed the roof-first approach used at several German heavy bunker projects, often described as Verbunkerung, in which a massive reinforced-concrete roof slab was built before excavation proceeded beneath it. When the first bombing raid took place in February 1944, the roof of the main structure was still unfinished.

Modern site surveys describe the intended main structure as approximately 228 m (748 ft) long and 45 m (148 ft) wide, with walls or roof sections approximately 5 m (16 ft) thick. The structure was planned on a scale comparable with, and possibly larger than, the better-known V-1 launch facility at Siracourt. The main bunker included a V-1 exit in the west wall similar to that originally planned at Siracourt. The site was served by a concrete access road and by a railway connection. A single-track railway in the ravine near Les Grands Bois served as the main unloading area, with sidings built alongside the track. Remains of a generator bunker, water reservoir, concrete-lined trench, air-raid shelter and road system have been reported by modern site surveys.

The complex was still incomplete when Allied bombing began in February 1944. Construction had definitely stopped by the end of April 1944, before the site could become operational.

== Allied discovery and bombing ==
Allied aerial reconnaissance and photographic interpretation played a central role in identifying German V-weapon sites in northern France. Large fixed construction projects such as Wasserwerk Desvres were especially exposed to detection because of their size, visible construction activity and telltale railway construction, a characteristic feature of the large rail-served heavy sites.

During the autumn of 1943, Allied photographic interpreters identified several heavy sites in the Pas-de-Calais and Cotentin. In the Pas-de-Calais, Mimoyecques was reported on 25 September 1943, Siracourt on 5 October, Lottinghen on 2 November and Wizernes on 5 November.

The bombing campaign against Lottinghen began on 24 February 1944, then 38 B-24 Liberators bombed the target on 29 February 1944. The roof was still unfinished when the first raid took place. The attack also damaged a neighbouring hutted camp associated with the construction works. The 391st Bombardment Group carried out attacks on 4 and 5 March 1944.

Another mission is recorded against "Lottinghen/Les Grands Bois" on 13 March 1944, when 40 B-26 Marauders were sent against the target but most of the force aborted because of bad weather.

Selected recorded Allied attacks on the Lottinghen V-weapon site
Date	Force	Notes
24 February 1944	US Ninth Air Force	First bombing raid recorded: "145 B-26’s bomb NOBALL targets between Saint-Omer and Abbeville during afternoon". The roof of the main structure was still unfinished.
29 February 1944	US Eighth Air Force	48 B-24s of the Eighth Air Force, of which 38 dropped 112.5 tons of high explosives on the V-weapon site at Lottinghen.
4–5 March 1944	391st Bombardment Group	
13 March 1944	US Ninth Air Force	40 B-26s of the Ninth Air Force were directed against the V-weapon site at Lottinghen/Les Grands Bois; 37 aborted because of bad weather.
30 April 1944	Allied air forces	Last raid recorded; by this time construction work had stopped.

Bombing continued until 30 April 1944, by which time construction work had stopped. Wasserwerk Desvres suffered nine raids totalling about 600 t (660 short tons) of bombs dropped on the site, while modern site surveys give a similar figure of more than 600 t (660 short tons) between late February and 30 April 1944. Because the main bunker was incomplete and had not advanced beyond the middle stages of Verbunkerung, the bombing was sufficient to halt work before the arrival of Allied ground forces.

== Operational status ==
Wasserwerk Desvres never became operational. No V-1 flying bombs were launched from the site, and there is no evidence that the main bunker, launch infrastructure or logistical system was completed before the German withdrawal from the area.

The failure of the site reflected a wider problem for the early heavy V-weapon installations. Large heavily fortified sites offered theoretical protection but were difficult to conceal from aerial reconnaissance and required lengthy construction periods. By the time the V-1 flying bomb campaign began against Britain in June 1944, German launch operations relied chiefly on smaller, more dispersed and better-camouflaged launch sites rather than the large Wasserwerk complexes.

In post-war assessments, the heavy Crossbow installations attracted attention because they represented the most visible and resource-intensive part of the German V-weapons construction programme in occupied France. In late 1944, Colonel Terence Sanders of the Royal Air Force was sent to France to inspect the five large Pas-de-Calais bunker sites. In his detailed inspection report submitted on 21 February 1945, Sanders did not consider Lottinghen a military priority because it was the least advanced of the five major sites he had examined.

== Post-war history and present condition ==
After the war, Wasserwerk Desvres had little continuing military value because the site was incomplete and had never become operational. The exact date on which the Siracourt and Lottinghen sites were removed from military status is not known. Their removal from military status occurred between 1946 and 1952 at the latest. This marked the definitive end of the site's military function.

After its abandonment by the military, the Lottinghen bunker was not rehabilitated and the remains of Wasserwerk Desvres fell into neglect in the woodland of Les Grands Bois. (Note: One of the few recent visual records of the site consists of a set of photographs published on the blog Maquetland, probably taken in the early 2010s.) The forest contains numerous bomb craters left by the 1944 raids. The largest surviving complete structure is an air-raid bunker on the edge of the forest. The main bunker structure remains incomplete and heavily overgrown. Modern site surveys identify the remains of the main concrete structure, generator bunker, water reservoir, road system, railway trackbed, concrete-lined trench and air-raid shelter. The site is on private land and is not open to the public.

== See also ==
- V-1 flying bomb facilities
- Operation Crossbow
- Siracourt V-1 bunker
- Blockhaus d'Éperlecques
- La Coupole
- Fortress of Mimoyecques
- V-weapons
- Organisation Todt

== Bibliography ==
- "Le Wasserwerk". À la découverte des vestiges des Armes allemandes (in French). 12 July 2017.
- Carter, Kit C.; Mueller, Robert (1991). U.S. Army Air Forces in World War II: Combat Chronology 1941–1945 (PDF). Washington, D.C.: Center for Air Force History.
- Collier, Basil (1976) [1964]. The Battle of the V-Weapons, 1944–1945. Yorkshire: Emfield Press. ISBN 0-7057-0070-4.
- Deschamp, Marc (2024). "Les Sonderbauten du Pas-de-Calais : un progressif démantèlement de leur éphémère fonction militaire". In Byhet, Thomas; Diest, Philippe; Aubry, Christine (eds.). Les Places fortes des Hauts-de-France, t. 6 : Le démantèlement des fortifications dans les Hauts-de-France (XVIe–XXe siècle). Entre pertes patrimoniales et (re)découvertes archéologiques [The Sonderbauten of Pas-de-Calais. A gradual dismantling of their ephemeral military function] (in French). Vol. 70. Villeneuve-d'Ascq: Institut de Recherches Historiques du Septentrion. ISBN 978-2-490296-43-9.
- Gruen, Adam L. (1998). Preemptive Defense: Allied Air Power Versus Hitler's V-Weapons, 1943–1945 (PDF). The U.S. Army Air Forces in World War II. Washington, D.C.: Air Force History and Museums Program.
- Hautefeuille, Roland (1995). Constructions spéciales : histoire de la construction par l'Organisation Todt, dans le Pas-de-Calais et le Cotentin, des neuf grands sites protégés pour le tir des V1, V2, V3 et la production d'oxygène liquide, 1943–1944 (in French) (2nd ed.). Paris: Cerin. ISBN 2-9500899-0-9.
- Henshall, Philip (2002). Hitler's V-Weapon Sites. Stroud: Sutton Publishing. ISBN 978-0-7509-2607-2.
- Jones, R. V. (1978). Most Secret War. London, UK: Hamish Hamilton. ISBN 0-241-89746-7.
- "Commune de Lottinghen". lottinghen.com (in French). Commune de Lottinghen.
- Delefosse, Yannick (July 2005). Gratianne, J.M. (ed.). "Les bases de V1" (PDF). On ne passe pas Magazine (in French).
- "Pas de Calais Lottinghen Wasserwerk V1 Desvres". Maquetland.com (in French). Archived from the original on 24 May 2026.
- "Wasserwerk Desvres". NormandyBunkers.
- Sanders, Terence R. B. (1945). Investigation of the "Heavy" Crossbow Installations in Northern France (Report). Vol. 1. Crossbow Committee.
- Ramsey, Winston G. (1973). "The V weapons". After the Battle. 6: 2–29. ISSN 0306-154X.
- Williams, Allan (2013). Operation Crossbow: The Untold Story of Photographic Intelligence and the Search for Hitler's V Weapons. London: Preface Publishing. ISBN 978-1-84794-654-6.
- Zaloga, Steven J. (2005). V-1 Flying Bomb 1942–52: Hitler's Infamous "Doodlebug". Oxford: Osprey Publishing. ISBN 1-84176-791-3.
- Zaloga, Steven J. (2008). German V-Weapon Sites 1943–45. Fortress. Oxford: Osprey Publishing. ISBN 978-1-84603-247-9.
