= Équeurdreville =

Équeurdreville may mean or refer to:

- Équeurdreville-Hainneville, a commune in the Manche department of the Normandy region of northern France
- Équeurdreville, the community that merged with Hainneville on January 1, 1965 to form Équeurdreville-Hainneville
- Brécourt, a World War II V-weapon bunker built near Équeurdreville
