= Siracourt V-1 bunker =

Launch site for V-1 flying bombs

Siracourt
- Part of Nazi Germany
- Canton of Saint-Pol-sur-Ternoise, France
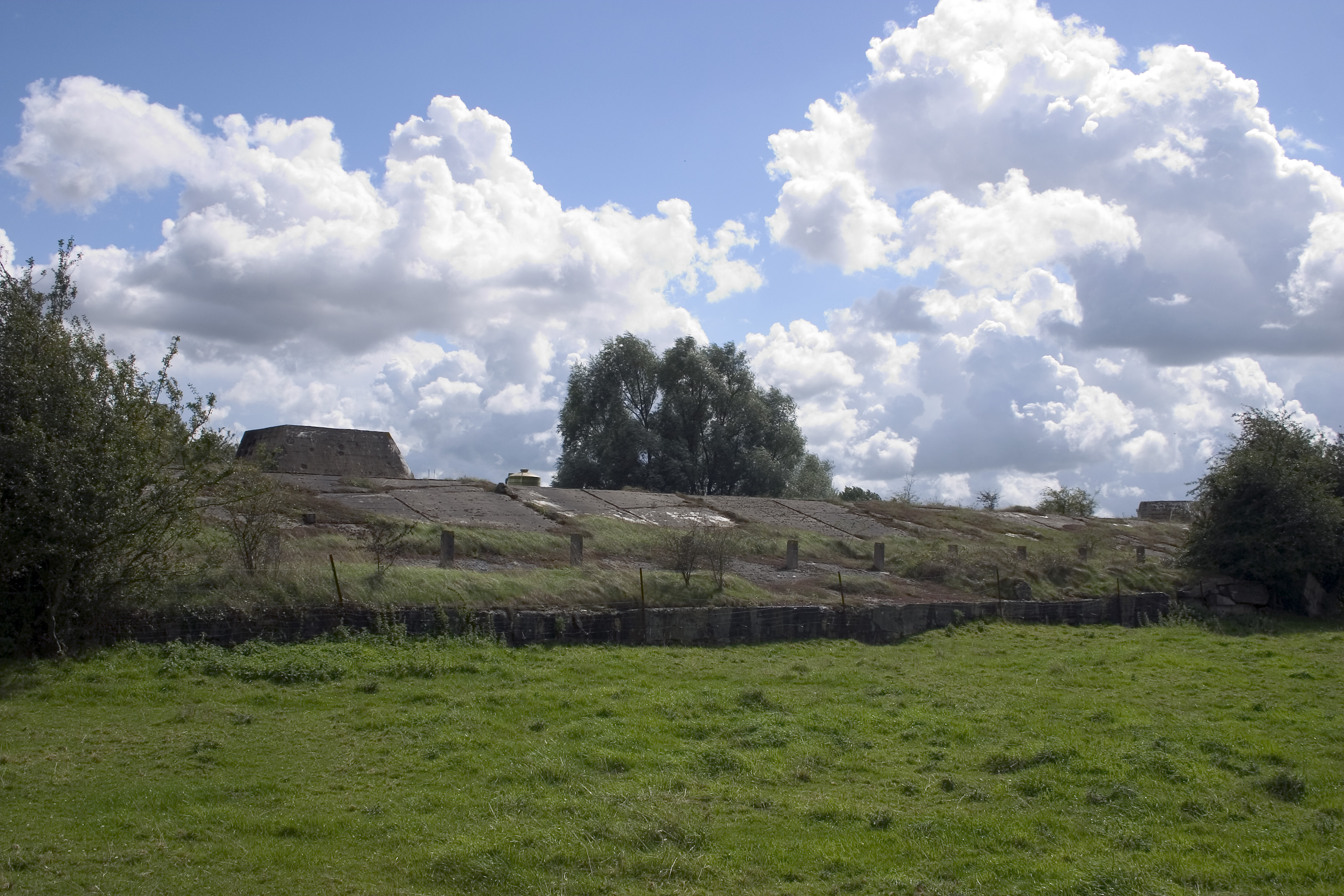
- Remains of Siracourt V-1 storage and launch depot

Site information
- Type: Unfinished fortified bunker complex; V-1 flying bomb storage, preparation and launch site
- Code: Wasserwerk St. Pol
- Owner: Privately owned
- Open to the public: No
- Condition: Ruined

Location
- Location within France
- Coordinates: 50.37424°N 2.26810°E
- Height: 10 metres (33 ft)

Site history
- Built: September 1943 – April 1944
- Built by: Organisation Todt
- In use: Captured before being used
- Materials: Concrete
- Battles/wars: Operation Crossbow, Operation Aphrodite

The Siracourt V-1 bunker is a Second World War bunker built in 1943–44 by the forces of Nazi Germany at Siracourt, a commune in the Pas-de-Calais department in the Nord-Pas-de-Calais region of France. Codenamed Wasserwerk St. Pol (Waterworks St Pol), it was intended for use as a bomb-proof storage facility and launch site for V-1 flying bombs. However, it never went into operation due to intensive Allied bombing that made it the most heavily attacked of all the German V-weapon sites, and also of all military targets in Europe during World War II.

== Background ==
Main German V-weapons heavy sites built or begun in France by the Organisation Todt from 1943 to 1944.

With the Allies gaining air superiority by 1943, different sections of the Luftwaffe – which had responsibility for the V-1 – debated how best the weapons could be deployed in the face of an increased threat of aerial bombardment. The Luftwaffe's Flak division favoured dispersing V-1s to a large number of small camouflaged launch sites. However, General Erhard Milch, who was in charge of the Luftwaffe's production programme, advocated large launch bunkers. Adolf Hitler was known to be in favour of such an approach, which had already led to the construction of a massive bunker at Watten for launching V-2 missiles. In July 1943, Luftwaffe chief Hermann Göring brokered a compromise under which both alternatives would be pursued; four (and ultimately ten) heavy launch bunkers would be built along with 96 light installations. The heavy bunkers were all intended to be built to a standard design, codenamed Wasserwerk (waterworks) to conceal their true purpose. The first two would be built in the Pas-de-Calais at Desvres near Lottinghen and Siracourt near Saint-Pol-sur-Ternoise. The two sites are about 177 kilometres (110 mi) and 210 kilometres (130 mi) from London respectively. Two more would be built at Tamerville and at Couville on the Cotentin Peninsula near Cherbourg. It was intended that all four would be operational by December 1943, with further bunkers to be built subsequently.

== Design and construction ==
The Siracourt bunker is about 215 metres (705 ft) long, 36 metres (118 ft) wide and 10 metres (33 ft) high, built using some 55,000 m³ of steel-reinforced concrete. Its design and method of construction took into account the lessons learned from the destruction in August 1943 of the Watten bunker while it was still under construction. It was constructed on high ground about a kilometre (three-quarters of a mile) north of the Hesdin-Saint Pol road, to the north of the original site of the village of Siracourt. The bunker was built in loamy soil some 7.5 metres (25 ft) deep, resting on a layer of chalk bedrock. The German engineers adopted a new method which they called Verbunkerung, which involved first building the roof flat on the ground then excavating beneath it – sheltered from bombs – to create the rest of the facility.

The bunker would have been linked with the main railway line from Saint Pol to Abbeville, enabling trains carrying V-1s and supplies to enter the body of the structure. It was, in effect, a fortified railway tunnel with a storage area capable of housing 150 missiles and an aperture from which they would have been launched. Although Allied reconstructions imagined a single launch ramp, it is possible that the Germans intended to install two parallel ramps to increase the rate at which V-1s could be fired.

It is also possible that, as early as November 1943, the Luftwaffe decided to continue the construction works at Siracourt and other Wasserwerk sites to deceive Allied intelligence into believing that the sites were still under active construction and to use the four Wasserwerk sites as ‘bomber baits’.

== Discovery and destruction ==
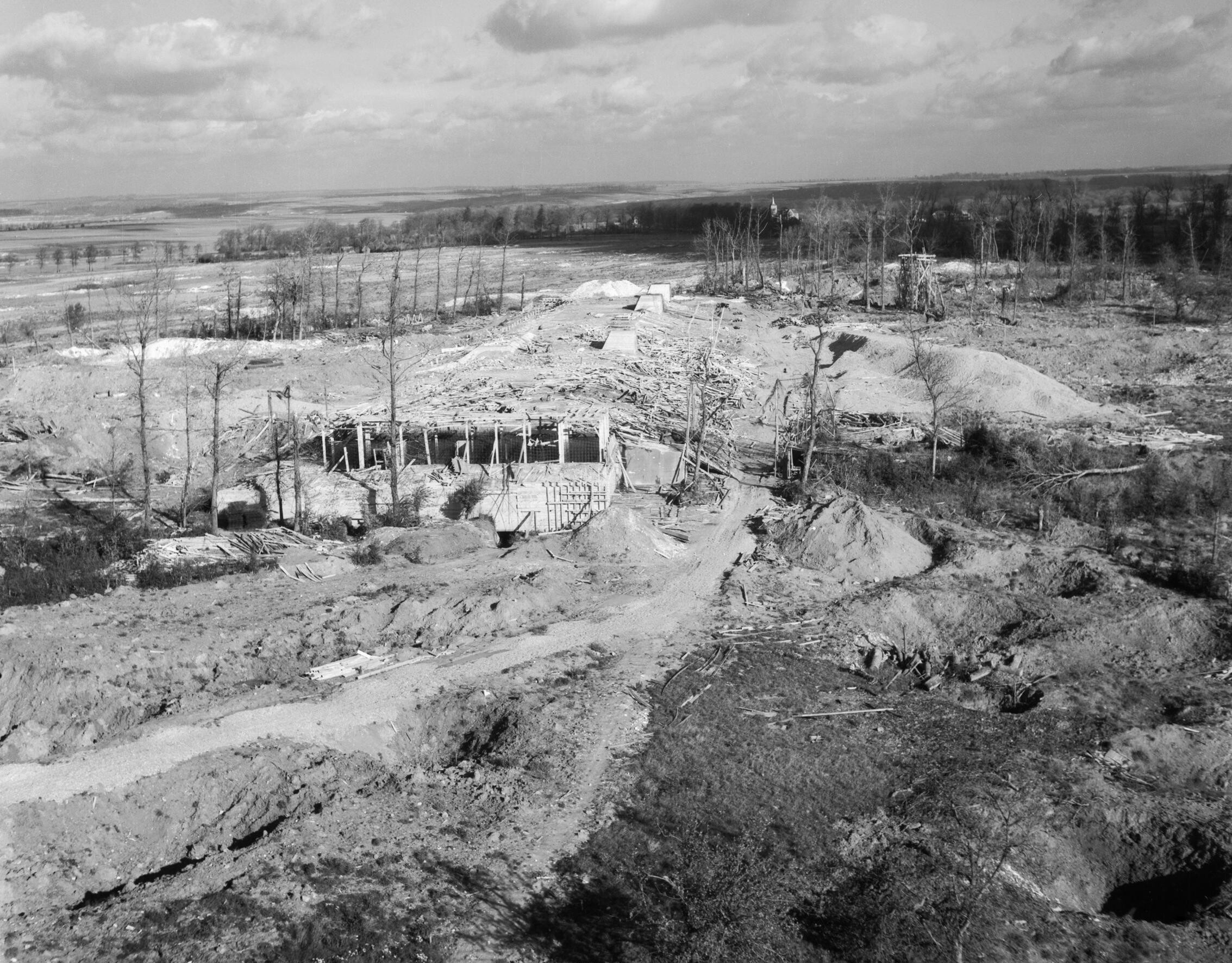
Low-level oblique aerial photograph showing the heavily-bombed flying-bomb assembly and launch bunker at Siracourt (1944).

The Allies spotted the construction of the Siracourt bunker almost as soon as it began in September 1943, when two parallel trenches were dug and concreted to form the walls of the structure. Heavy Allied bombing hindered construction but it continued until the end of June 1944, when the site was wrecked by Tallboy bombs dropped by the Royal Air Force. By this time about 90 per cent of the concrete had been completed, apart from the end sections, but the supposedly bomb-proof structure proved unable to withstand the six-ton Tallboy. One bomb fully penetrated the roof and exploded underneath, while another caused substantial damage when it exploded next to one of the walls. The ground around the site was churned up by over 5,000 tons of bombs. By the time the site was abandoned in April 1944, the exterior had practically been completed but the excavation of the interior had only just begun. Roland Hautefeuille estimated that Siracourt was the most heavily bombed military target in all of Europe with 5,070 tons of bombs directed at it. These bombs considerably change the terrain around the site, destroying most of the village of Siracourt. After the war, the authorities quickly abandoned the idea of demolishing the bunker. Before the land was leveled, 80 German prisoners of war removed the launching ramp facing England and partially filled in the interior of the bunker.

The Siracourt bunker is still extant today and is visible from the road. It is located on private land.

== Air raids on the Siracourt site ==
Bombing of Siracourt in World War II
Date	Result
January 31, 1944	Mission 203: 74 of 74 B-24s hit V-weapon site construction at St. Pol/Siracourt, France; 2 aircraft are damaged beyond repair; no losses. The B-24s are escorted by 114 P-47s
February 2, 1944	Mission 205: 95 of 110 B-24s hit V-weapon construction sites at St Pol/Siracourt and Watten, France; 2 B-24s are lost, 1 is damaged beyond repair and 2 damaged; casualties are 10 KIA and 19 MIA. 183 P-47s escort the B-24s without loss.
February 6, 1944	Mission 212: 150 B-24s are dispatched to St Pol/Siracourt V-weapon site but 37 hit Chateaudun Airfield
February 8, 1944	Mission 214: 53 of 54 B-24s hit the V-weapon site at Siracourt
February 11, 1944	Mission 218: 94 of 201 B-24s, including the HEAVEN CAN WAIT II of the 68th Squadron, bomb the Siracourt V-weapon site in France with PFF equipment
February 12, 1944	Mission 220: 97 of 99 B-24s hit the V-weapon site at St Pol/Siracourt, France; 29 B-24s are damaged (the HEAVEN CAN WAIT II crash-landed); no losses or casualties; escort is provided by 84 Eighth and Ninth Air Force P-47's and 41 P-51s; no claims, losses or casualties.
February 13, 1944	Mission 221 included the 453rd Bombardment Group
February 15, 1944	Mission 223: 52 of 54 B-24s hit V-weapon sites at St Pol/Siracourt, France; 29 B-24s are damaged; no losses or casualties.
March 12, 1944	Mission 256: 46 of 52 B-24s dispatched hit a V-weapon site at St Pol/Siracourt, France and 6 hit targets of opportunity, all using blind-bombing techniques; 1 B-24 is lost and 26 damaged; casualties are 1 WIA.
April 5, 1944	Mission 288: 21 of 50 B-24s dispatched hit V-weapon sites at St Pol/Siracourt, France without loss; heavy clouds and the failure of blind-bombing equipment cause other B-24s to return to base without bombing. 50 P-47s escort the B-24s without loss.
April 20, 1944	Mission 309 included the 466th Bombardment Group
April 22, 1944	B-17 42-95928 Shot down by flak on a mission to Siracourt V-1 launch site. MACR#4093.
April 27, 1944	Mission 322 included the 466th Bombardment Group
April 30, 1944	Mission 329: 52 of 55 B-24s bomb V-weapon sites at Siracourt; 3 B-24s are damaged; 1 airman is WIA. Escort is provided by 128 P-38s, 268 P-47s and 248 Eighth and Ninth Air Force P-51s
May 1, 1944	A mission included the 401st Bombardment Group
May 2, 1944	Mission 335 included the 453rd Bombardment Group
May 6, 1944	Mission 340: 168 bombers and 185 fighters are dispatched to hit NOBALL (V-weapon) targets in France; 90 B-17s dispatched to the Pas de Calais area return to base with bombs due to cloud cover over the target; 70 of 78 B-24s hit Siracourt; 48 B-17s are damaged. Escort is provided by 57 Ninth Air Force P-38s, 47 P-47s and 81 P-51s without loss.
May 15, 1944	Mission 356: 166 bombers and 104 fighters hit V-weapon sites in France with 1 fighter lost; 38 of 58 B-17s bomb Marquise/Mimoyecques with 5 B-17s damaged; 90 of 108 B-24s bomb Siracourt with 8 B-24s damaged; escort is provided by 104 P-51s with 1 lost (pilot is MIA). One B-24 received a direct hit by an AAA shell. At least one aircraft aborted.
May 21, 1944	Mission 360: 150 bombers and 48 fighters hit V-weapon sites in France without loss; 25 of 40 B-17s hit Marquise/Mimoyecques and 13 B-17s are damaged; 99 of 110 B-24s hit Siracourt and 1 B-24 is damaged. Escort is provided by 48 P-47s without loss. At least one aircraft aborted.
May 22, 1944	Mission 361: 94 of 96 B-24s hit V-weapon sites at Siracourt, France; 1 B-24 is damaged. Escort is provided by 145 P-38s, 95 P-47s and 328 P-51s; P-38s claim 8-1-5 Luftwaffe aircraft, P-47s claim 12-1-2 and P-51s claim 2-2-1; 3 P-38s, 3 P-47s and a P-51 are lost; 1 P-38 and 2 P-47s are damaged beyond repair; 1 P-38, 2 P-47s and a P-51 are damaged; 6 pilots are MIA.
May 30, 1944	Mission 380 included the 447th Bombardment Group
June 21, 1944	Mission 429: In the late afternoon, 31 B-24s bomb CROSSBOW (V-weapon) supply sites at Oisemont/Neuville and Saint-Martin-L'Hortier and 39 bomb a rocket site at Siracourt, France. AA fire shoots down 1 B-24; escort is provided by 99 P-47s, meeting no enemy aircraft, but 1 group strafes railroad and canal targets.
June 22, 1944	234 aircraft – 119 Lancasters, 102 Halifaxes, 13 Mosquitos – of Nos 1, 4, 5 and 8 Groups to special V-weapon sites and stores. The sites at Mimoyecques and Siracourt were accurately bombed by 1 and No 4 Group forces with Pathfinder marking but the No 617 Squadron force attacking Wizernes failed to find its target because of cloud and returned without dropping its bombs. 1 Halifax lost from the Siracourt raid.
June 25, 1944	323 aircraft – 202 Halifaxes, 106 Lancasters, 15 Mosquitos – of Nos 1, 4, 6 and No 8 Group attacked 3 flying bomb sites. The weather was clear and it was believed that all 3 raids were accurate. 2 Halifaxes of No 4 Group were lost from the raid on the Montorgueil site. No 617 Squadron sent 17 Lancasters, 2 Mosquitos and 1 Mustang to bomb the Siracourt flying-bomb store.
June 29, 1944	286 Lancasters and 19 Mosquitos of Nos 1, 5 and 8 Groups attacked 2 flying-bomb launching sites and a store. There was partial cloud cover over all the targets; some bombing was accurate but some was scattered. 5 aircraft – 3 Lancasters and 2 Mosquitos – lost, including the aircraft of the Master Bomber on the raid to the Siracourt site.
July 6, 1944	551 aircraft – 314 Halifaxes, 210 Lancasters, 26 Mosquitos, 1 Mustang (Group-Captain Leonard Cheshire's marker aircraft) – attacked 5 V-weapon targets. Only 1 aircraft was lost, a No 6 Group Halifax from an on Siracourt flying-bomb store. Four of the targets were clear of cloud and were believed to have been bombed accurately but no results were seen at the Forêt de Croc launching site. Three Tallboy bomb hits are claimed, but the postwar Sanders Report indicates no direct hits.
August 1, 1944	No. 617 Squadron RAF
August 4, 1944	Mission 515: The first Operation Aphrodite mission is flown using 4 radio-controlled war weary B-17s as flying bombs. The B-17G 42-39835 Wantta Spa pilot was killed, and the Siracourt drone had control problems and crashed in a wood at Sudbourne in Suffolk.

== Bibliography ==
- Livesey, Jack (2008). "Wasserwerk Siracourt" (PDF). Mars & Clio (22). British Commission for Military History. Archived from the original (PDF) on 2012-03-26.
- Sanders, Terence R.B. (1945). Investigation of the "Heavy" Crossbow installations in Northern France. Report by the Sanders Mission to the Chairman of the Crossbow Committee: Appendix D. Vol. 1.
- Zaloga, Steven J.; Johnson, Hugh; Taylor, Chris (2008). German V-Weapon Sites 1943–45. Osprey Publishing. ISBN 978-1-84603-247-9.
- Zaloga, Steven J.; Laurier, Jim (2005). V-1 Flying Bomb 1942–52: Hitler's Infamous 'Doodlebug'. Osprey publishing. ISBN 978-1-84176-791-8.
