= Sottevast V2 bunker =

World War II bunker complex

Sottevast Reservelager West
- Sottevast, Normandy, France
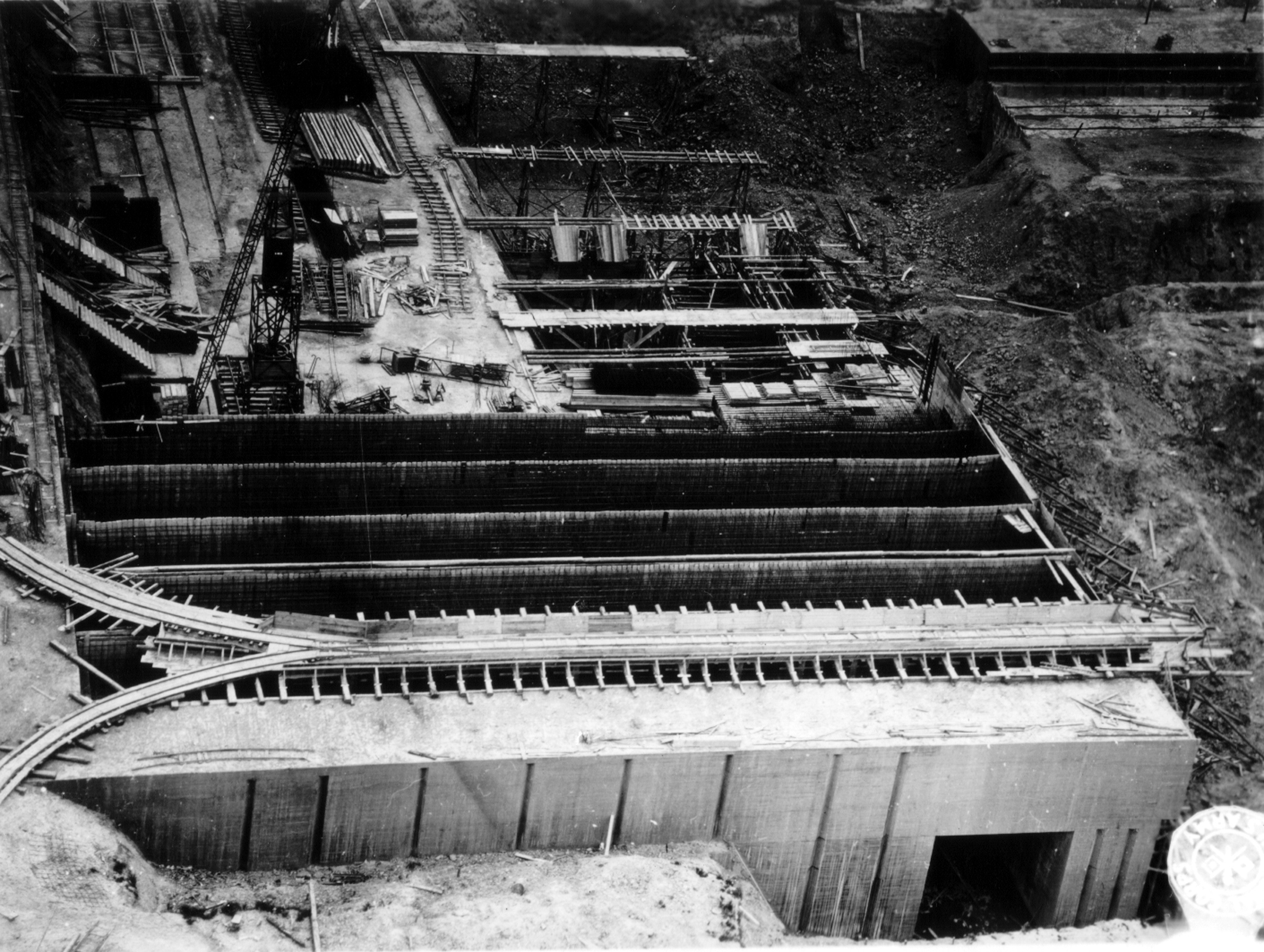
- Aeral view of the V2 rocket site at Sottevast in 1944

Site information
- Type: Bunker; V-2 rocket storage facility
- Code: Reservelager West
- Owner: Private property
- Controlled by: Nazi Germany
- Open to the public: No
- Condition: ruins

Location
- Location within France
- Coordinates: 49°32′14.98″N 1°34′54.7″W

Site history
- Built: 1943-1944
- Built by: Organization Todt
- In use: never operational
- Materials: reinforced concrete
- Battles/wars: Operation Crossbow

Sottevast was a Second World War bunker complex for launching V2-weapons in Sottevast near Cherbourg, in Normandy, France. It was built, under the codename Reservelager West (Reserve Store West), by the forces of Nazi Germany between 1943 and 1944 to serve as a launch base for V-2 rockets directed against southern England.

The bunker was never completed as a result of the bombings by the British and United States air forces as part of Operation Crossbow against the German V-weapons program and the Normandy landings in June 1944.

== Background ==
Main German V-weapons heavy sites built or begun in France by the Organisation Todt from 1943 to 1944.

The V-2 rocket (German: Vergeltungswaffe 2, "Retribution Weapon 2") was one of several innovative long-range weapons developed by the Germans after the failure of the Luftwaffe to strike a decisive blow against Britain. The missile, powered by a liquid-propellant rocket engine, was developed during the Second World War in Germany as a "vengeance weapon", assigned to attack Allied cities as retaliation for the Allied bombings against German cities.

The German leadership hoped that a barrage of rockets unleashed against London would force Britain out of the war. Although Adolf Hitler was at first ambivalent, he eventually became an enthusiastic supporter of the V-2 program as Allied air forces carried out increasingly devastating attacks on German cities.

Nazi Germany decided to build four giant bombproof bunkers to assemble, service and launch V2 rockets in the North of France. Watten and Wizernes were set up in Pas-de-Calais, Sottevast and Brécourt on the Cherbourg peninsula in Normandy.

At the end of May 1943, the British Chiefs of Staff ordered that aerial attacks be carried out against the so-called "heavy sites" being built for the V-weapons. On 27 August 1943, the US Air force attacked Watten with devastating effect. It was no longer possible to use it as a V-2 launch site, but the Germans still needed liquid oxygen production facilities to supply V-2 sites elsewhere. The Germans' main focus of attention switched instead to Schotterwerk Nordwest, the former quarry at nearby Wizernes, where work had been ongoing to build a bombproof V-2 storage facility. This project was expanded to turn the quarry into a fixed launch facility. The Reservelager West in Sottevast and the Olkeller Cherbourg near Brécourt were designed to be launcher bunkers like Watten with the main building measuring about 30 by 200 metres (100 ft × 655 ft)

Following Operation Crossbow bombing, initial plans for launching from the massive underground Watten and Wizernes bunkers or fixed pads such as near the Château du Molay were dropped and forced Walter Dornberger to develop mobile launching systems. In November 1943, Dornberger ordered that the oxygen machines planned for installation at Sottevast be placed in facilities in the rear.

== Description ==
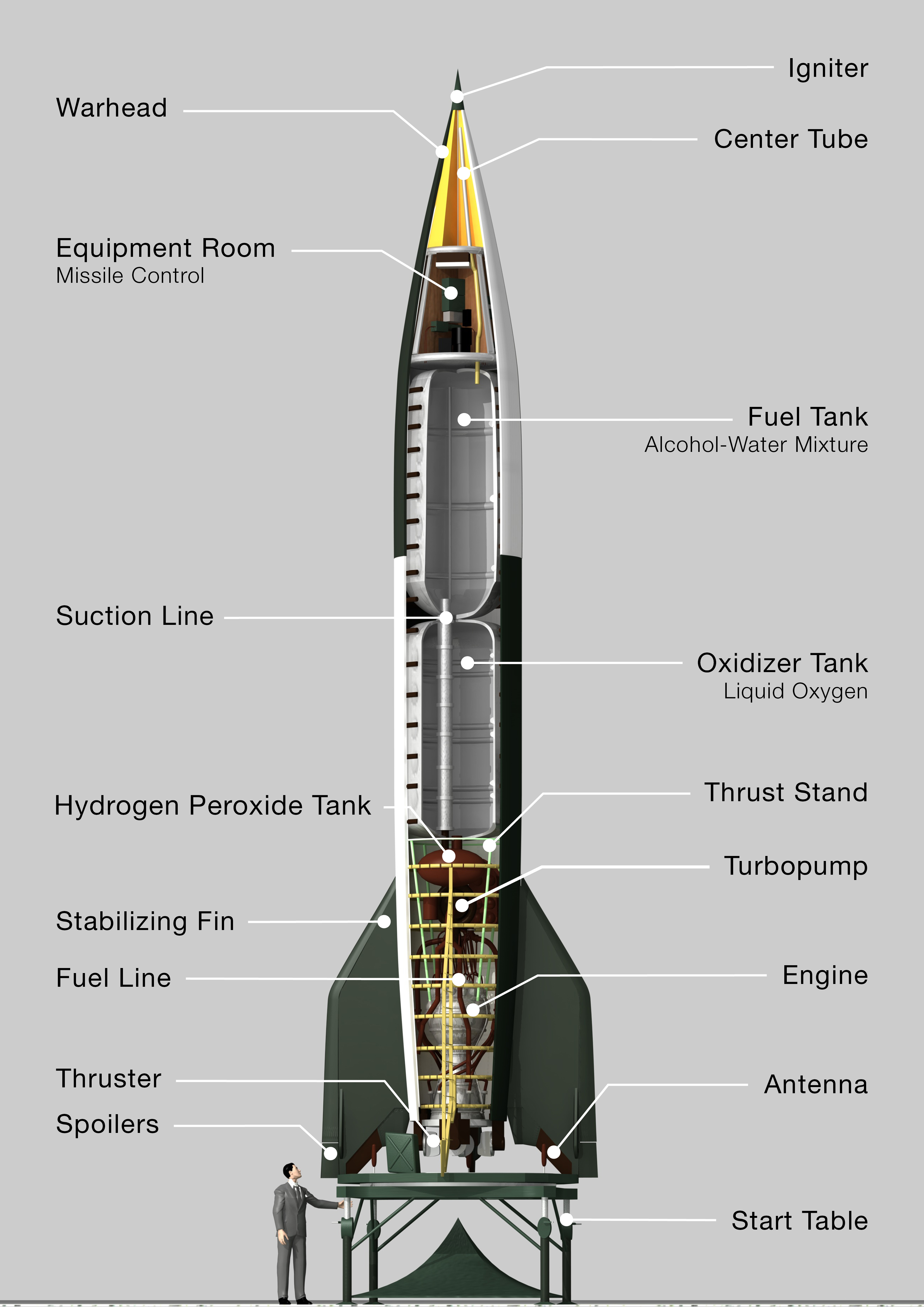
Layout of a V-2 rocket

Hitler decided the construction of the Sottevast site in July 1943 to target southeast England. The bunker was to be an exact copy of the V-2 launch bunker at Watten, including a liquid oxygen factory with five machines and monthly production capacity of 1500 tons, to fire V-2 ballistic missiles. It was conceived to accommodate a missile regiment and a store for 300 missiles.

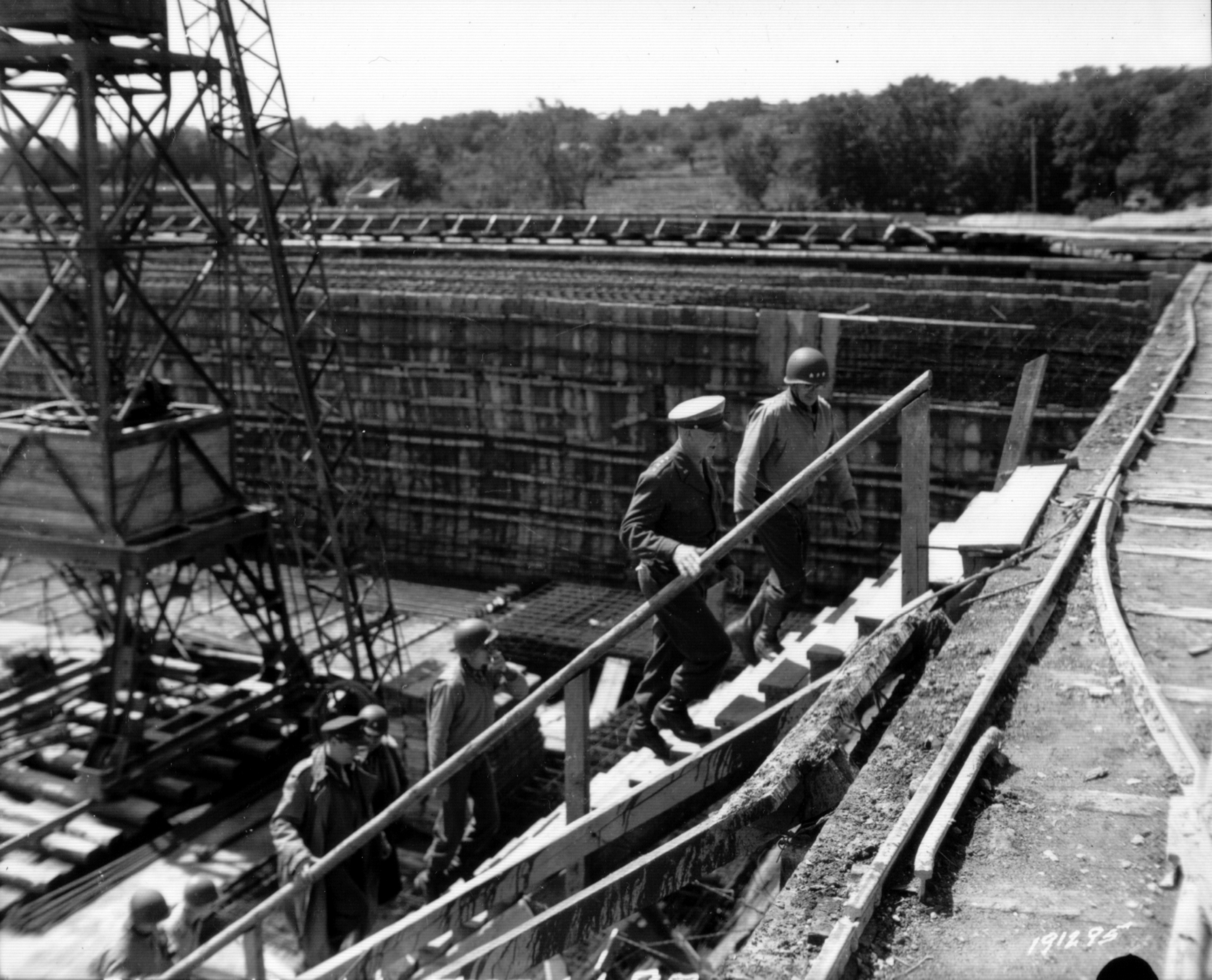
Generals Eisenhower and Bradley visiting Sottevast days after D-Day.

The bunker was located on an isolated piece of land to the north of the road to Valognes and to the east of the road to Brix, close to the latter municipality. The site should have been serviced by a narrow gauge, considering that the main railway line was less than 200 metres (655 ft).

The L-shaped main building enclosed a large concrete pad, forming a 180 m long by 57 m wide rectangle with 4.50 m-thick walls. Two other smaller bunkers were built on the site but no installations to produce liquid oxygen.

Sottevast was built using the technique known as "Verbunkerung". Organisation Todt engineer Werner Flos devised a plan under which the 5-m thick roof would be built first, flat upon the ground, and the soil underneath it would be excavated so that the construction works below would be protected against aerial attacks.

While Watten and Wizernes were designed to be capable of frequently launching V-2 rockets and, by their size, future developments like the A9/A10, Sottevast was not designed to be capable of launching V2 rockets frequently. The V2 rocket would have been transported by train to Sottevast, transferred to the narrow gauge train, serviced along the L-shaped building and launched from the same entrance. This configuration would have made it difficult to launch more than a dozen of rockets per week, with a payload per rocket equivalent to that of a classical bomber. According to Henshall, Sottevast and the other launch silos in the Cherbourg peninsula were not designed to launch V-2 rockets with conventional warheads but chemical warheads, with nerve gas like Tabun and Sarin, or radioactive warheads.

Views of the Sottevast at the Liberation (1944)
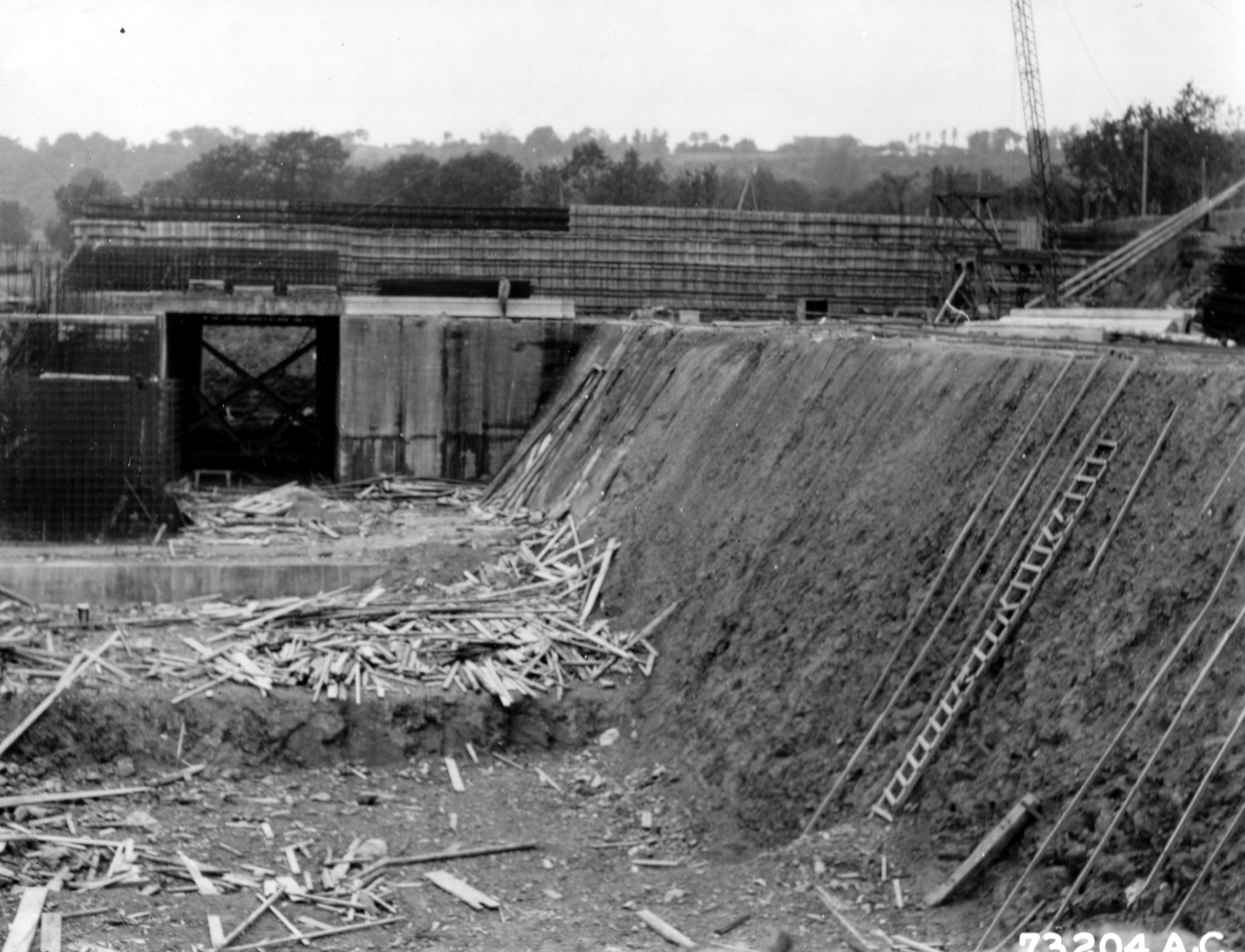

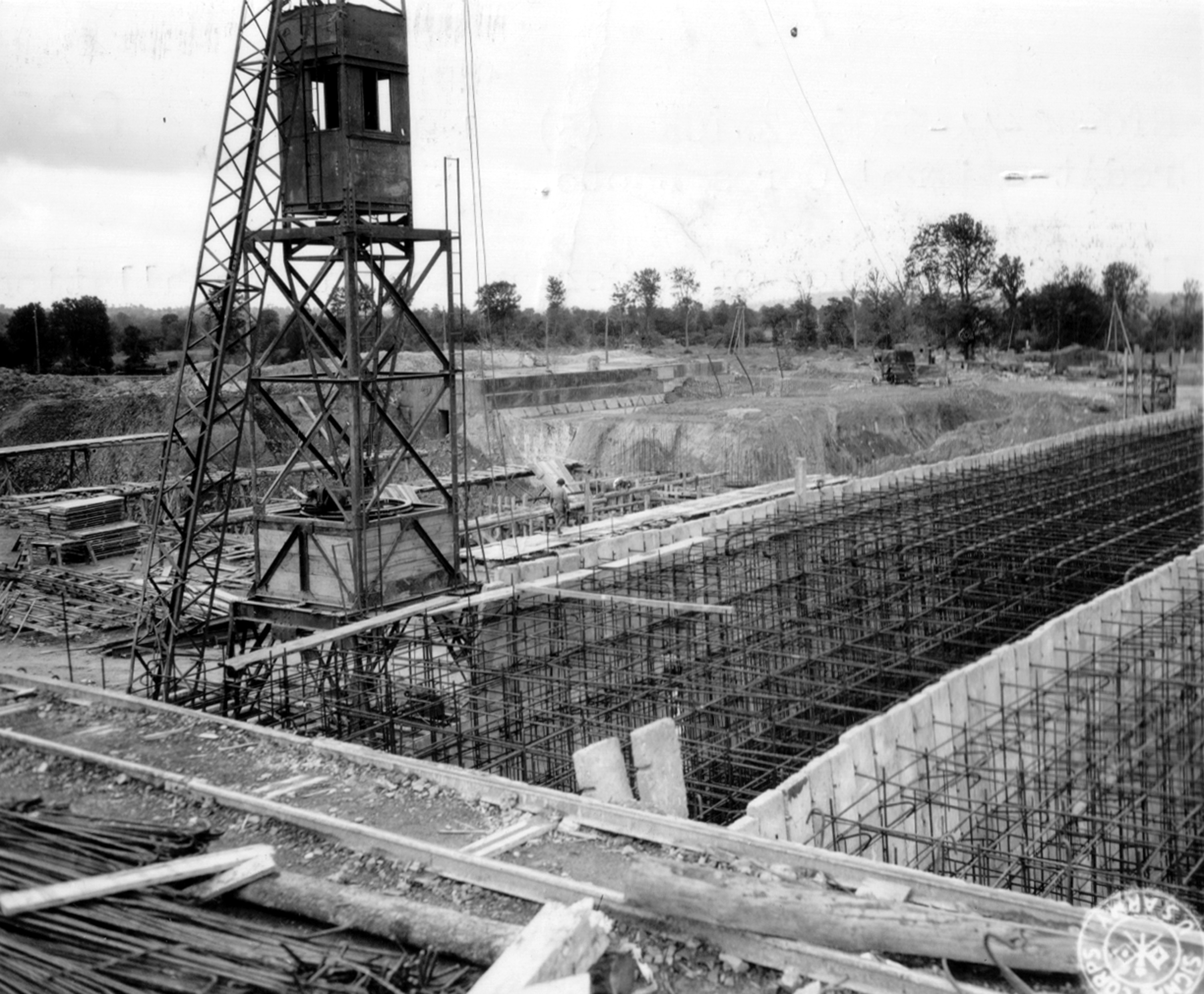

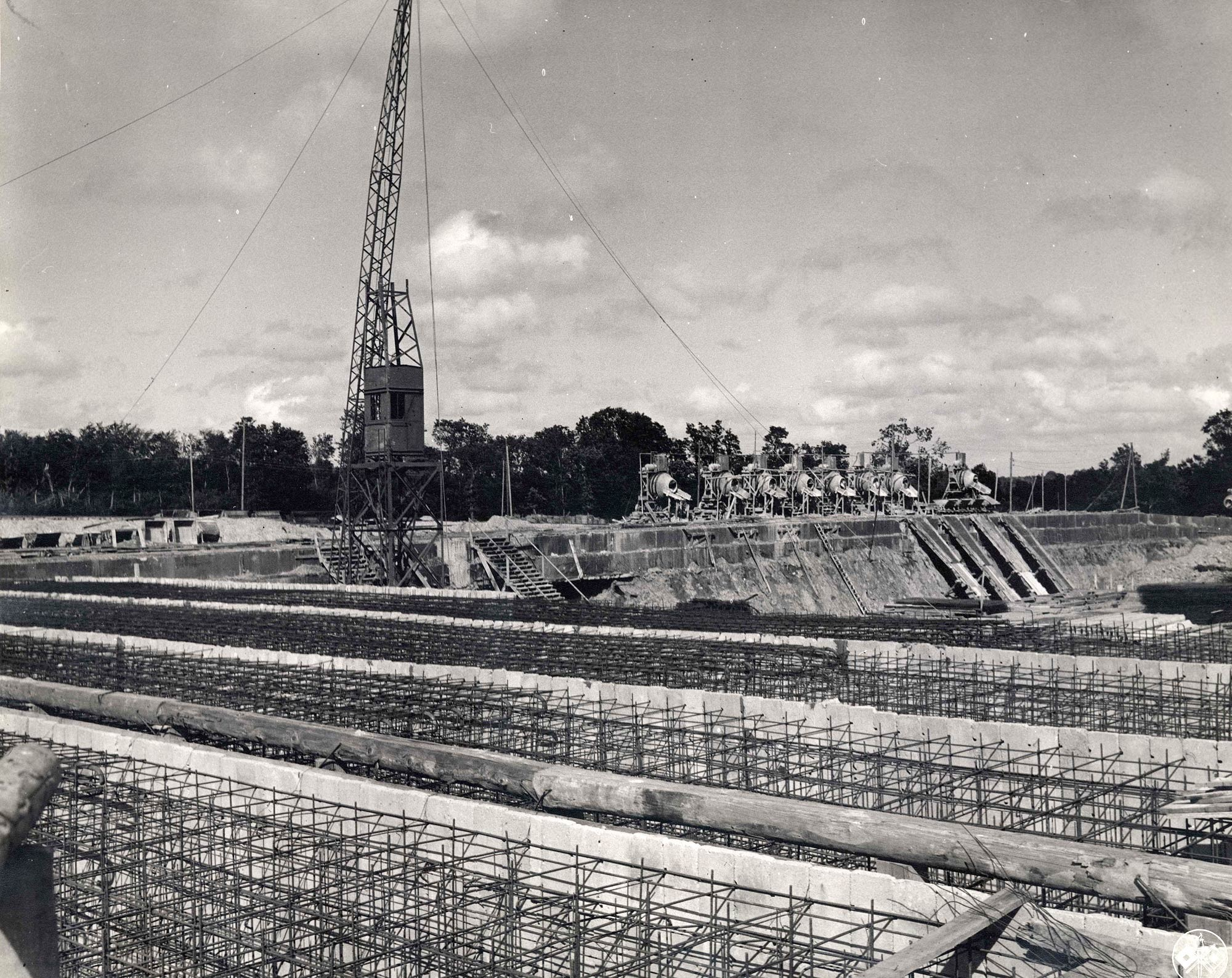

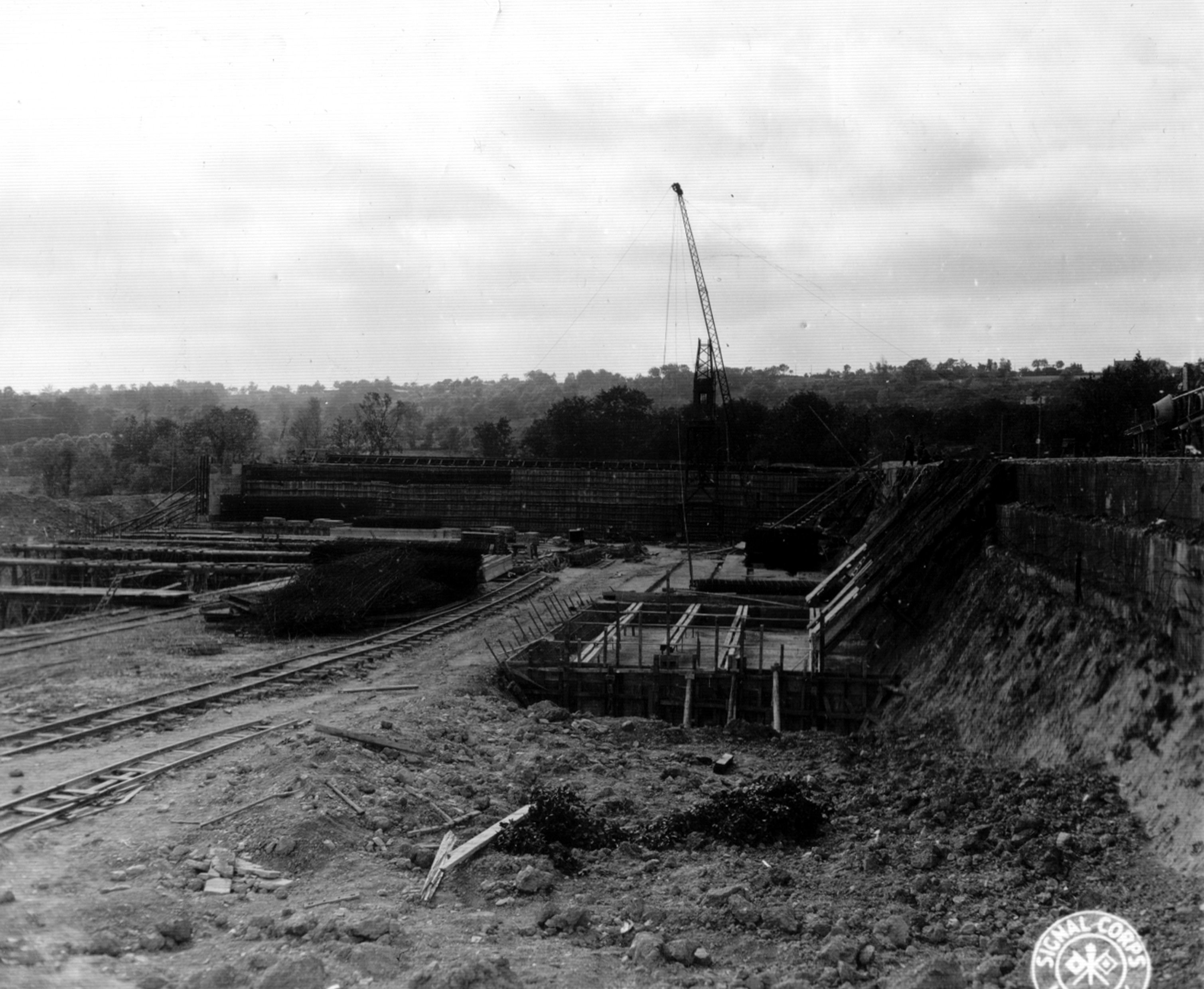

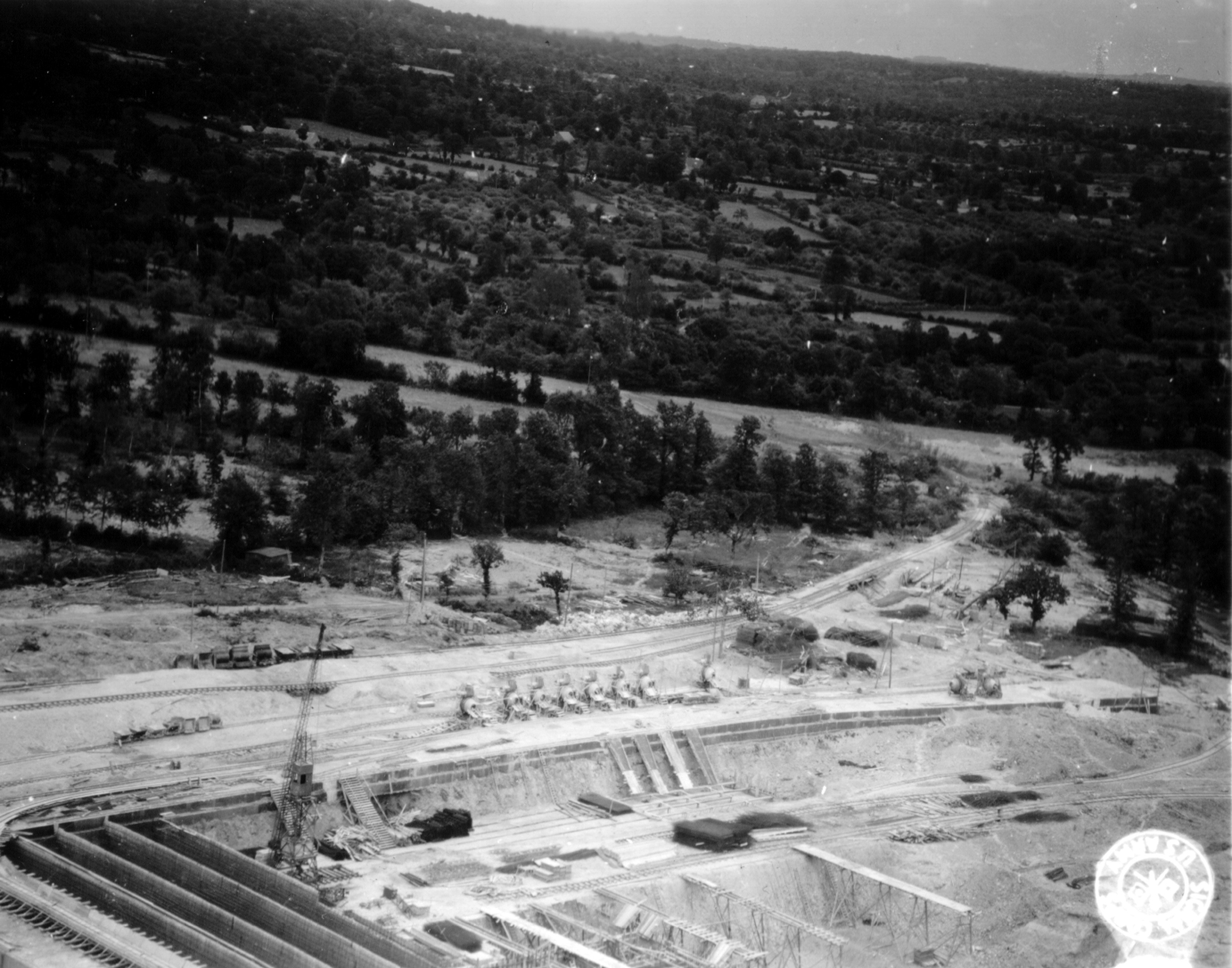

The site was partially completed when it was captured by the 314th Infantry Regiment of the 79th Infantry Division during the Normandy campaign. Generals Eisenhower and Bradley visited Sottevast days after D-Day. The site was filled in by the US Army at the end of the war, under twenty metres of soil.

== Operation Crossbow ==
In May 1943 Allied surveillance observed the construction of the first of eleven large sites in northern France for secret German weapons, including six for the V-2 rocket. The construction works at the Sottevast site was first reported on 31 October 1943. It was repeatedly bombed in April and May 1944.

Chronology
Date	Result
29 February 1944 1 March 1944	One Mosquito to a "flying-bomb site" at "Sottevast"
28 April 1944	Mission 325: 14 of 116 B-17s bomb the Sottevast, France V-weapon site and targets of opportunity; clouds prevent most B-17s from bombing; 2 B-17s are lost (1 has 6 KIA and 5 POW. It is worth noting that among the KIA on this Mission was Col. Robert Kelly the Commander of the 100th Bomb Group and on his plane was Cpt. Joepsh “Bubbles” Payne who was featured on Masters of the Air.) and 47 damaged; 3 airmen are WIA and 21 MIA. Escort is provided by 46 P-47s without loss.
5 May 1944	33 B-24s bomb V-weapon installation at Sottevast.
8 May 1944	Mission 345: 384th Bombardment Group. 52 B-17s bomb the V-weapon site at Sottevast.

== See also ==
- Blockhaus d'Éperlecques
- La Coupole
- Fortress of Mimoyecques
