= Couville =

- Commune
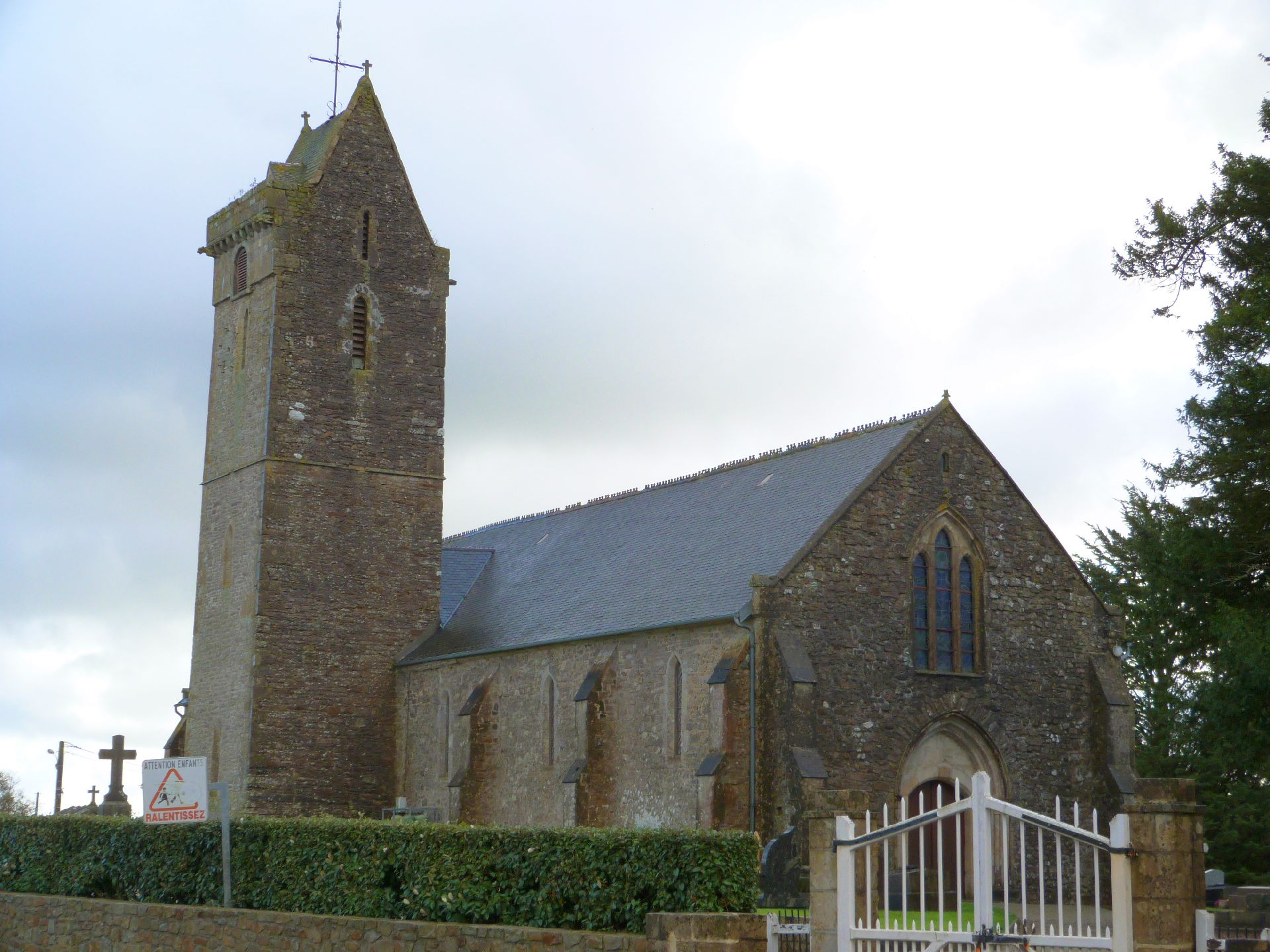
- The church of Notre-Dame
- Location of Couville
- Location within France Location within Normandy
- Coordinates: 49°33′16″N 1°41′05″W
- Country: France
- Region: Normandy
- Department: Manche
- Arrondissement: Cherbourg
- Canton: Cherbourg-en-Cotentin-3
- Intercommunality: CA Cotentin

Government
  - Mayor (2020–2026): Sédrick Gourdin
- Area^{1}: 8.60 km^{2} (3.32 sq mi)
- Elevation: 100 m (330 ft)
- Highest elevation: 130 m (430 ft)
- Lowest elevation: 45 m (148 ft)
- Population (2023): 1,249
  - Density: 145/km^{2} (376/sq mi)
- Demonym: Couvillais
- Time zone: UTC+01:00 (CET)
  - Summer (DST): UTC+02:00 (CEST)
- INSEE/Postal code: 50149 /50690
- Website: mairie-de-couville.fr
- ^{1} French Land Register data, which excludes lakes, ponds, glaciers > 1 km^{2} (0.386 sq mi or 247 acres) and river estuaries.

Couville (French pronunciation: [kuvil]) is a commune in the Manche department in Normandy in north-western France.

In 1943, a V-1 flying bomb launch and preparation complex was built in the outskirts of Couville. Its German codename was Wasserwerk Cherbourg (lit. 'Cherbourg waterworks').

== See also ==
- Communes of the Manche department
