= Tamerville =

- Commune
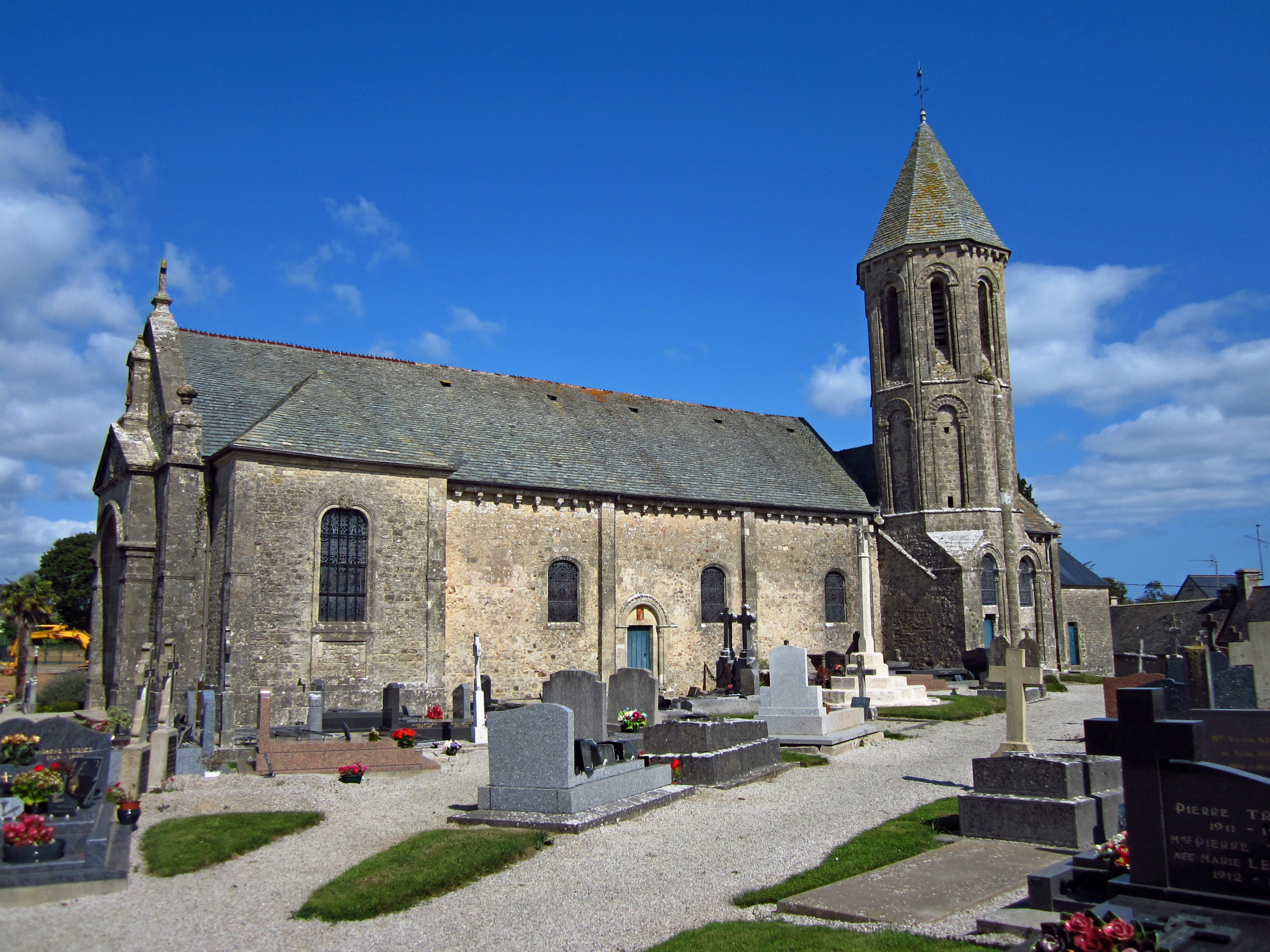
- The church of Notre-Dame-de-l'Assomption
- Location of Tamerville
- Location within France Location within Normandy
- Coordinates: 49°32′02″N 1°27′03″W
- Country: France
- Region: Normandy
- Department: Manche
- Arrondissement: Cherbourg
- Canton: Valognes
- Intercommunality: CA Cotentin

Government
  - Mayor (2020–2026): Jean-Pierre Berteaux
- Area^{1}: 18.20 km^{2} (7.03 sq mi)
- Elevation: 68 m (223 ft)
- Highest elevation: 126 m (413 ft)
- Lowest elevation: 33 m (108 ft)
- Population (2023): 691
  - Density: 38.0/km^{2} (98.3/sq mi)
- Demonym: Tamervillais
- Time zone: UTC+01:00 (CET)
  - Summer (DST): UTC+02:00 (CEST)
- INSEE/Postal code: 50588 /50700
- Website: www.tamerville50.fr
- ^{1} French Land Register data, which excludes lakes, ponds, glaciers > 1 km^{2} (0.386 sq mi or 247 acres) and river estuaries.

Tamerville is a commune in the Manche department in Normandy in north-western France.

The Manoir de Bellauney, a chateau dating back to the 15th century, is now a hotel.

== See also ==
- Communes of the Manche department
