= Brécourt =

V-1 launching pad built by Nazi Germany in Normandy, France

Coordinates: 49°39′7″N 1°40′12″W

- aliases: Équeurdreville, Martinvast
- Part of Nazi Germany
- Équeurdreville-Hainneville, Manche, Normandy, France
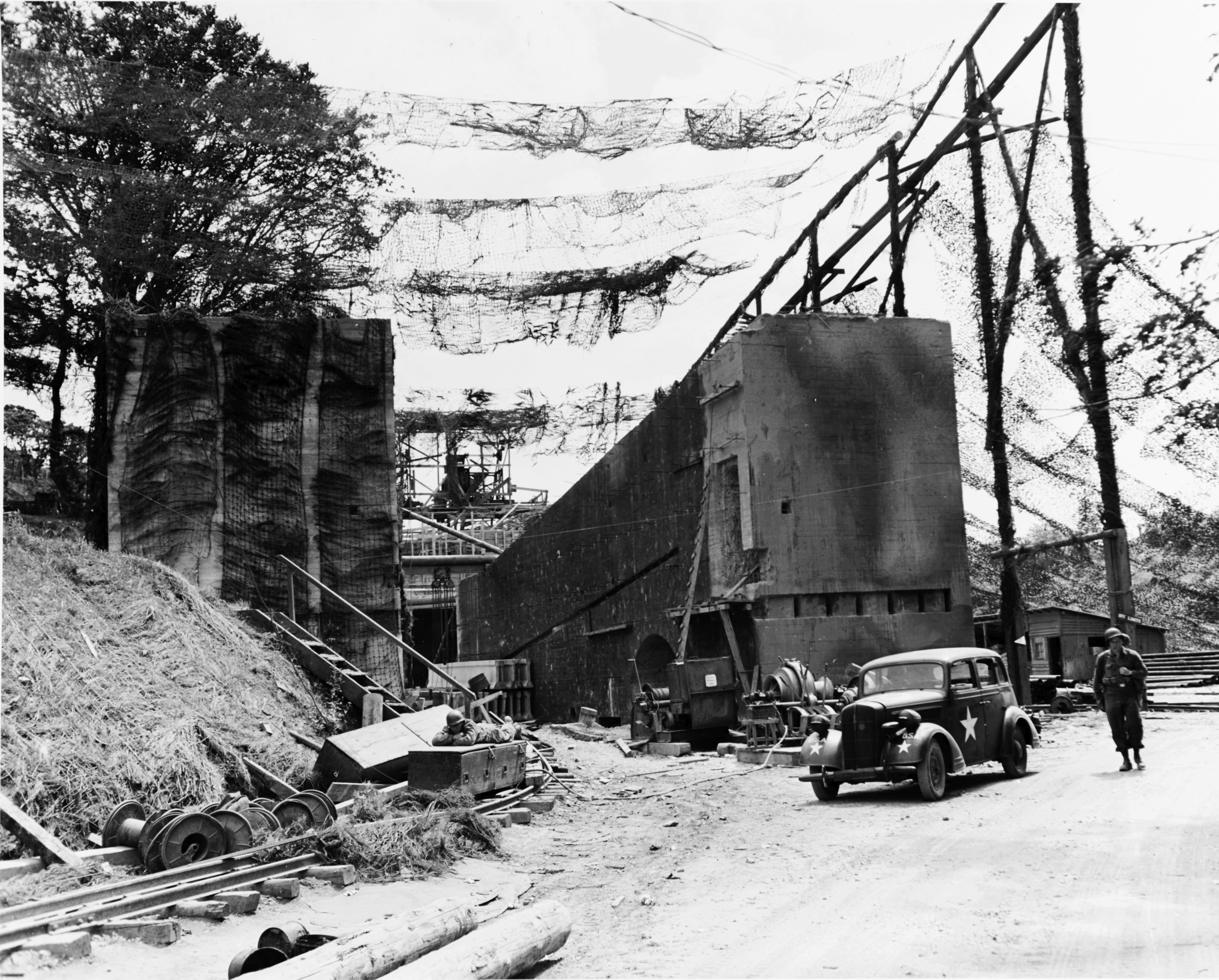
- Rear view of the incomplete launching ramp for German V-1 flying bombs, at Brécourt, Cherbourg, 12 July 1944. Note the camouflage netting suspended over the site.

Site information
- Type: Bunker; V-1 flying bomb launch facility
- Code: Wasserwerk Nr. 2
- Owner: French Navy
- Open to the public: No
- Condition: ruins

Location

Site history
- Built: 1932 French oil storage cisterns; July–December 1943 V-2 facility; 1943–1944 Nazi Germany V-1 launch facility
- Built for: V-1 launch facility
- Built by: Organization Todt
- In use: never used
- Materials: Reinforced concrete
- Battles/wars: Operation Crossbow
- Events: Bombed 11 November 1943; Captured July 1944

Garrison information
- Designations: Monument historique

Monument historique
- Official name: Rampe de lancement de V1 de Brécourt
- Type: Launching pad
- Designated: 23 February 1995
- Reference no.: PA00135509

Brécourt (French pronunciation: [bʁekuʁ]) was a Nazi Germany V-1 launching pad in Équeurdreville-Hainneville near Cherbourg, in Manche of Normandy, northern France. It was by far the largest V-1 launch complex ever built by the Luftwaffe, and the only one to feature two launching pads from the outset: one protected, the other underground. It was also the only large site to have been successively assigned to two different V-weapons: from July to December 1943 to the V-2 rocket, and from January 1944 to the V-1 flying bomb.

Originally built by the French Navy as underground fuel oil storage tunnels, the Brécourt facility was repurposed during World War II by the German Army to store V-2 rockets. At the end of 1943, the Luftwaffe took over the site and used it as a launch pad for V-1 flying bombs to attack the Bristol harbour. The launch pad, though not fully completed, was captured by American forces in July 1944.

== History ==
The French 1922 naval program recommended the conversion of coal-fired boilers in warships to oil-burning boilers, and obliged the French Navy to equip itself with storage facilities for this new fuel. The Brécourt site was chosen for strategic reasons, given its proximity to the port of Cherbourg in the commune of Equeurdreville-Hainneville. The construction works lasted from 1932 to 1938. 5,000 workers built eight concrete tanks with steel lining, each with a capacity of 10,000 m³ of fuel oil, under the granite hill, topped by 15 to 25 meters of rock to protect them from any kind of bombardment. Two underground electrical generators, equipped with 400 hp (300 kW) motors, were built to power the submersible pumps, ventilation and electrical system. Fuel oil was transported by pipelines from the storage tanks to the port to easily supply the warships with fuel. These major works provide the French Navy with optimum storage facilities for a total of 80,000 m^{3} (2,800,000 cu ft) of fuel oil in tanks with the following characteristics:

- Length: 72 metres (236 ft)
- Base width: 13.5 metres (44 ft)
- Width at vault: 15 metres (49 ft)
- Height at vault: 15 metres (49 ft)
- Max fuel height : 10.6 metres (35 ft)

During the German occupation of Cherbourg, the navy personnel made the facilities unusable by the occupying forces. After being liberated, the site returned to its original functions until 1986.

The bunker was declared a French protected monument on 23 February 1995. The site is closed to the public, except during the annual Heritage Days.

Main German V-weapons heavy sites built or begun in France by the Organisation Todt from 1943 to 1944.

== World War II ==
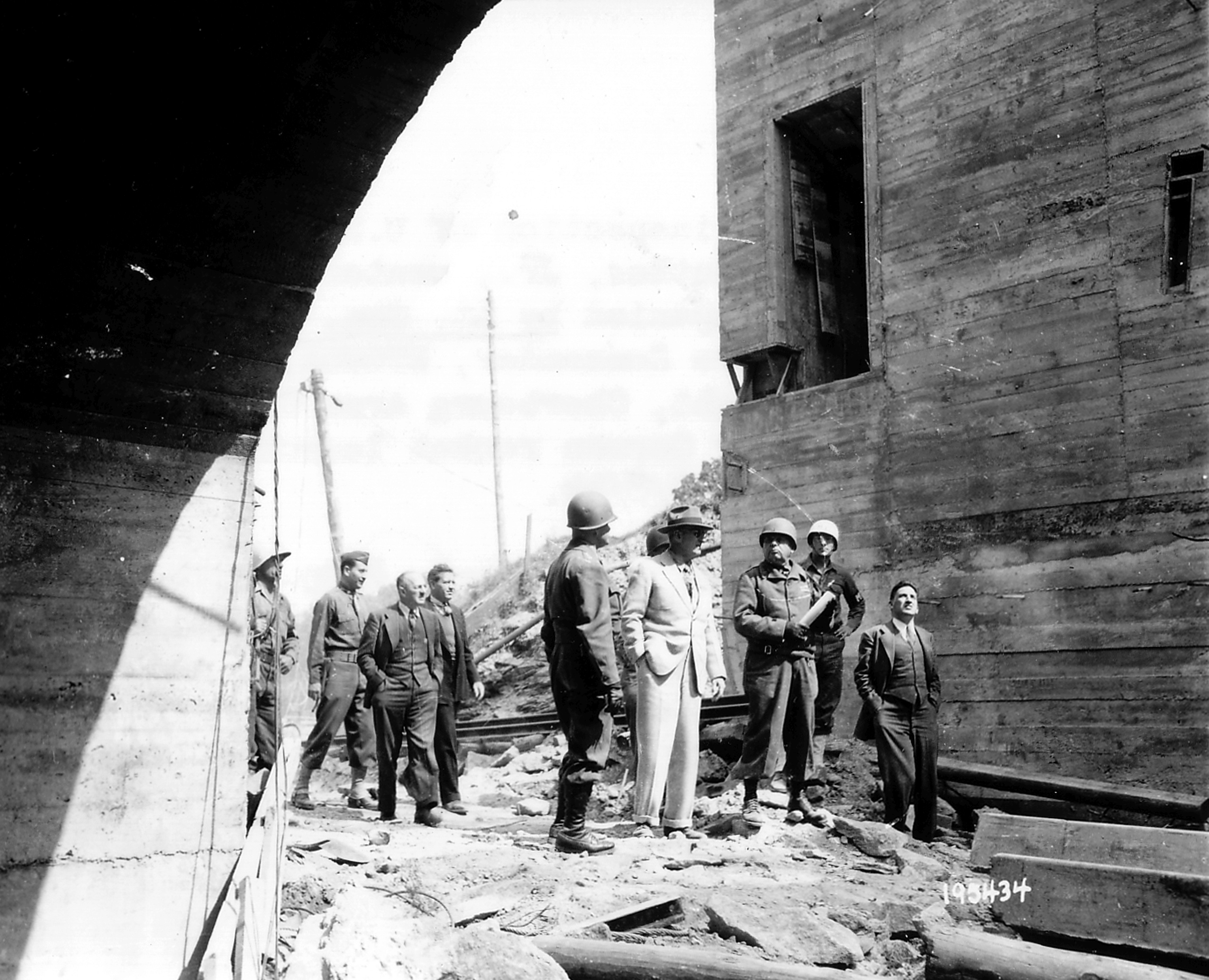
Henry Morgenthau Jr., Gen. John C. H. Lee and Col. Theodore Wyman, inspecting the V-1 launch site of at Brécourt (8 August 1944)

Codenamed Ölkeller Cherbourg ("Cherbourg oil cellar"), Brécourt's installations were reused by the German army to store V-2 rockets. Brecourt was variously codenamed was "Minenlager" (mine storage) or "Ersatz B8" or "Wasserwerk n°2". The site was intended to accommodate 30 V-2 rockets, 6 tanks capable of storing 330 tons of liquid oxygen, and equipment for mobile firing units that would utilize firing platforms to be established nearby. When the V-2 program was delayed by technical difficulties and the location was not found appropriate, the German Army abandoned its project to deploy the V-2 missile in Brécourt and became available at the end of 1943.

From late 1943, the facility was converted by the Luftwaffe to a V-1 flying bomb launch facility. The Luftwaffe decided to adapt the existing tunnels and to create two heavily protected launch pads equipped with catapult launchers for V-1 flying bombs. The nearby tunnel complex had the capacity to store 300 V-1 flying bombs, sufficient for approximately six days of launches. The ramp consisted of two parallel reinforced concrete walls, 75 m (246 ft) long, with a notch on the inside faces giving the slope of the ramp, which was oriented towards the port of Bristol.

Winston Churchill inspecting the V-1 launch site, codenamed "Wasserwerk N°2", at Brécourt (20 July 1944)

The Brécourt military installation was virtually undetectable by aerial observation. The site went therefore unnoticed by the Allies due to its small size and proximity to the coast, as it was viewed as part of the broader Atlantic Wall coastal fortification program, and pro. However, the 387th Bombardment Group records indicate Operation Crossbow bombing in Manche of a "Martinvast V-1 site" on 11 November 1943, which may have been Brécourt.

The isolation of the Cotentin Peninsula after the D-Day invasion prevented the deployment of V-1 equipment at Brecourt. The launch pad was not fully completed when the Allies captured Brécourt a few days before July 4, 1944. Both Dwight Eisenhower and Winston Churchill subsequently visited the facility.

== See also ==
- V-1 flying bomb (facilities)
