= V-weapons =

German WWII long range missiles

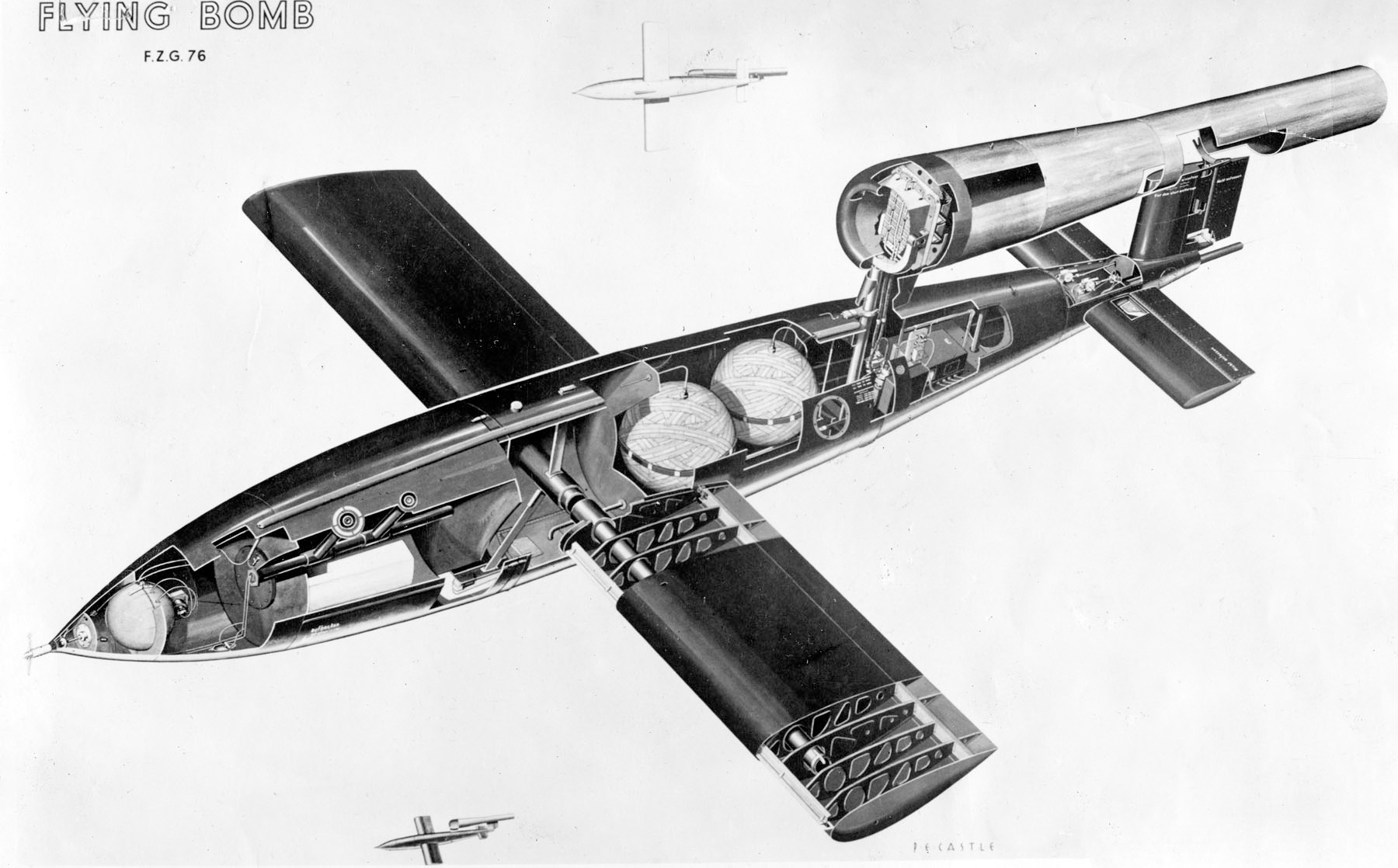
V-1 flying bomb

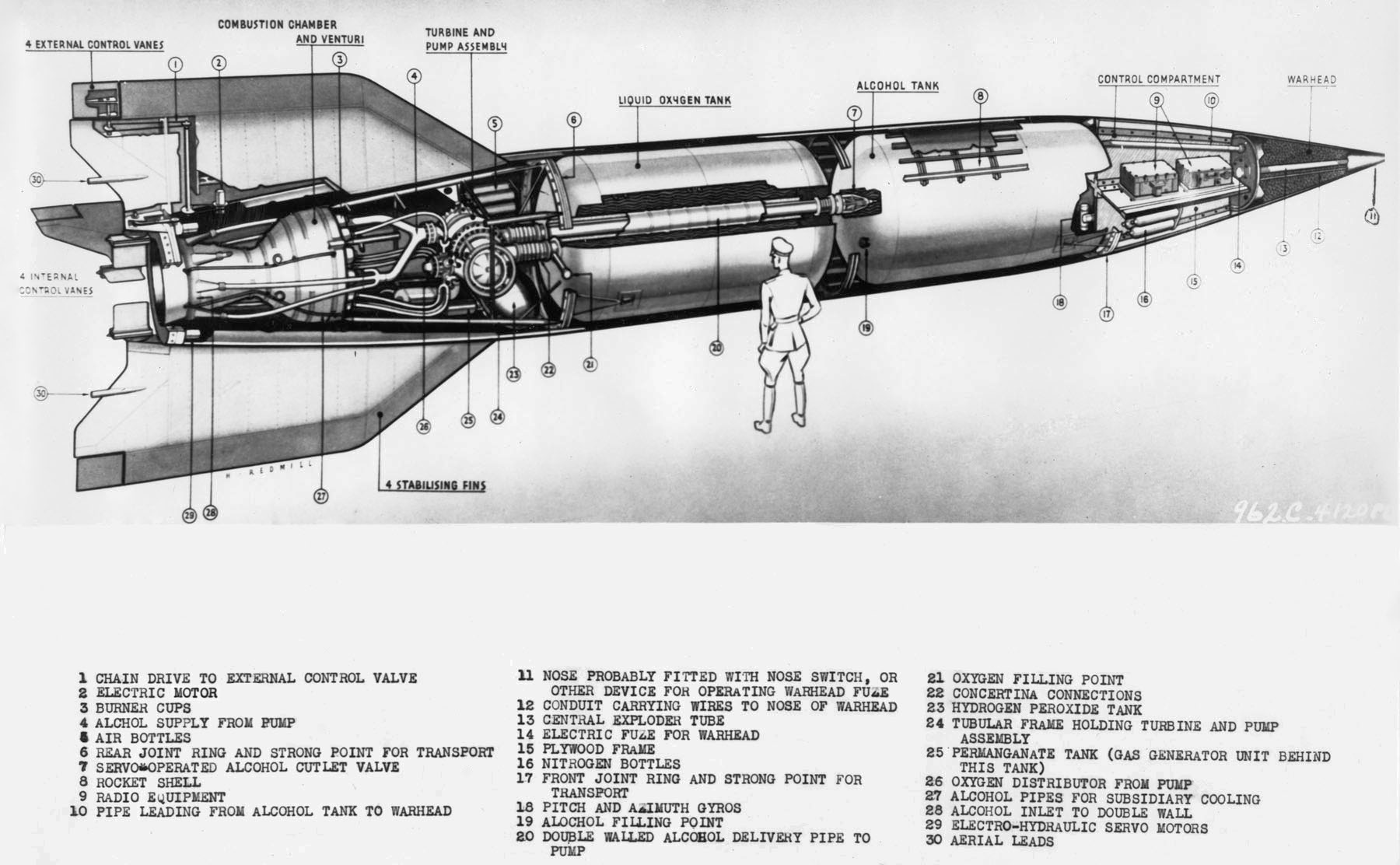
V-2 missile

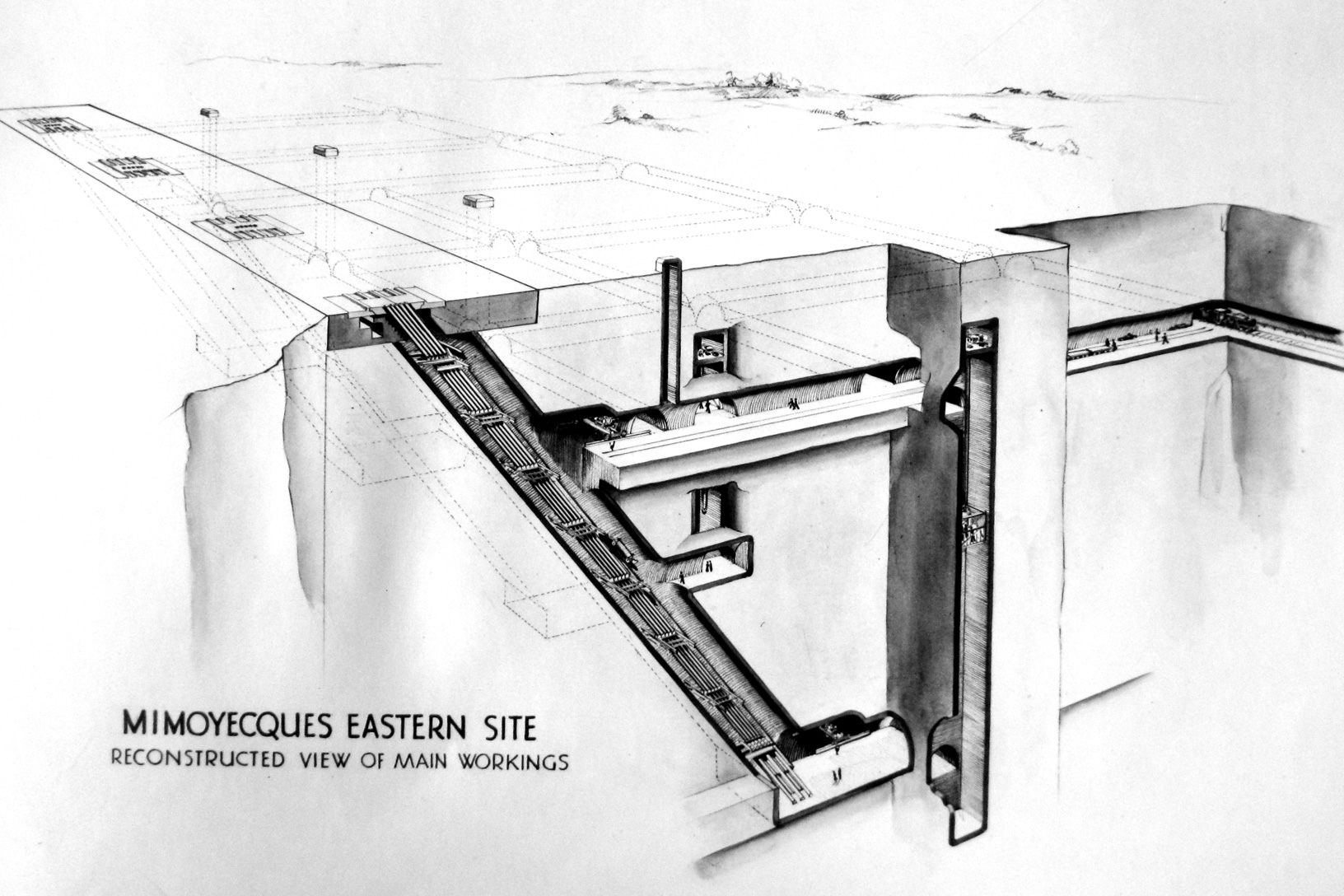
V-3 cannon

V-weapons, known in original German as Vergeltungswaffen (German pronunciation: [fɐˈgɛltʊŋsˌvafn̩], German: "retaliatory weapons", "reprisal weapons"), were a particular set of long-range artillery weapons designed for strategic bombing during World War II, particularly strategic bombing and aerial bombing of cities. They were the V-1, a pulsejet-powered cruise missile; the V-2, a liquid-fueled ballistic missile; and the V-3 cannon. Germany intended to use all of these weapons in a military campaign against Britain, though only the V-1 and V-2 were so used in a campaign conducted 1944–45. After the invasion of western Europe by the Allies, these weapons were also employed against targets on the mainland of Europe, mainly in France and Belgium. Strategic bombing with V-weapons killed approximately 18,000 people, mostly civilians. The cities of London, Antwerp and Liège were the main targets.

V-weapons formed part of the range of the so-called Wunderwaffen (superweapons, or "wonderweapons") of Nazi Germany.

== Development ==
As early as 28 June 1940, a strategic bombing rationale had been advanced for the A4 (V-2 rocket) being developed at a meeting between Army Ordnance Chief Emil Leeb and Commander-in-Chief of the Wehrmacht, Walther von Brauchitsch. Following the relative failure of the Baedeker Raids in Britain in 1942, development of both flying bomb and rocket accelerated, with Britain designated as the target. On 29 September 1943, Albert Speer publicly promised retribution against the mass bombing of German cities by a "secret weapon". Then the official 24 June 1944 Reich Propaganda Ministry announcement of the "Vergeltungswaffe 1" guided missile implied that there would be another such weapon. After the first operational A-4 launch in September 1944, the rocket was renamed the V-2. (although no one knows exactly who gave it this name). However, the V-2 operations manual distributed to firing batteries continued to use the A-4 name for the rocket.

Allen Dulles, head of the American secret service OSS in Switzerland, was in contact with the Austrian resistance group around the priest Heinrich Maier from 1943 onwards. Through this Dulles received crucial information and plans about Peenemünde, the V-1 and the V-2 rocket.

== Use against Britain and Mainland Europe 1944–45 ==
=== V-1 ===
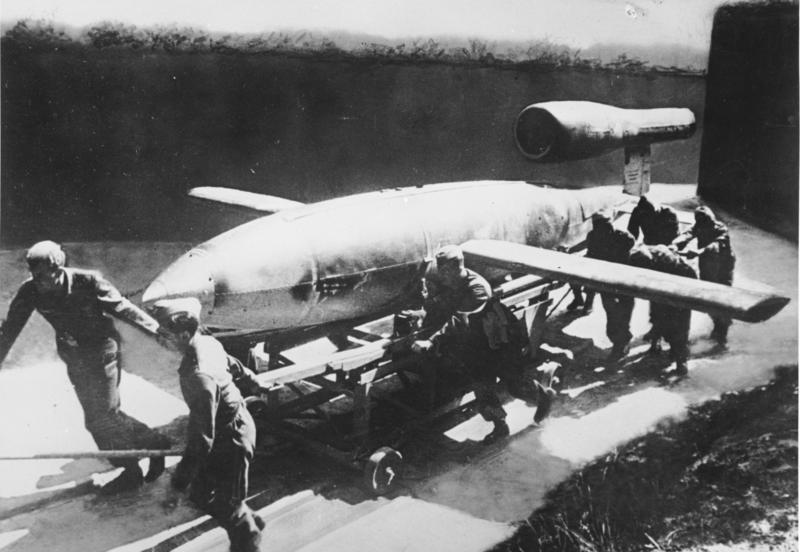
A V-1 is rolled out

Beginning in October 1943, launch sites for the V-1 were constructed in Northern France, along the coast from Calais to Le Havre. Aerial bombing attacks on these sites by the Allied airforce were only partially successful, and by June 1944 they were ready for action. Prompted by the Normandy Landings of 6 June, in the early morning of 13 June 1944, the first V-1 flying bomb attack was carried out on London. Ten missiles were launched, of which four reached England. The first of these impacted near Swanscombe, causing no casualties. At Bethnal Green, however, a bridge was destroyed, six people killed and nine injured. The attacks became sustained at a rate of about 100 a day. With the first attack the British put their pre-planned Operation Diver (after their codename "Diver" used for the V-1) into action.

The buzzing sound of the V-1's pulse jet engine was likened by some to "a motor cycle in bad running order". As it reached its target and dived, there would be a distinct sound of the propulsion unit spluttering and cutting out; the eerie hush before impact which followed was quite terrifying, according to observers. The brief interval of silence before detonation was also a warning to seek shelter (later V-1s were corrected to have the originally intended power dive). At least one business in London advertised how quickly a patron could access a nearby shelter. Despite this, the cloudy and rainy conditions of June and July aided the effectiveness of the weapon, and casualties were high. By late August a million and a half people had left London, and the rate of work production was affected. By the late summer and autumn, however, increasingly effective countermeasures against the V-1 were taken, and people started returning to London.

A total of 9,251 V-1s were fired at targets in Britain, with the vast majority aimed at London; 2,515 reached the city, killing 6,184 civilians and injuring 17,981. Croydon to the south, on the flight path of the V-1s, suffered severely, taking 142 hits.

=== V-2 ===
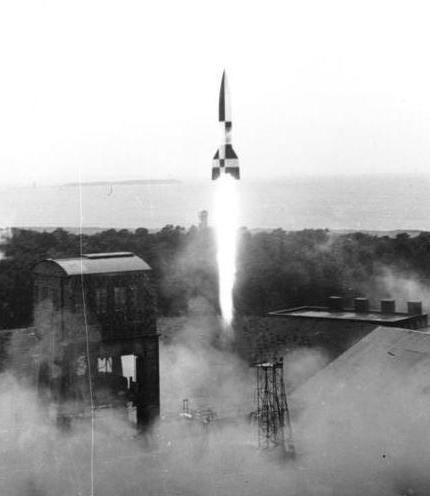
V-2 launch, Peenemünde

V-2 rocket launching sites were set up by the Germans around The Hague in the Netherlands on 6 September 1944. The first was launched from here against London on 8 September 1944 and took an estimated 5 minutes to fly the 200 miles (320 km) from the Hague to London, where it struck at 6:43pm on 8 September on Chiswick, causing 13 casualties. As the V-2 explosions came without warning, the government initially attempted to conceal their cause by blaming them on defective gas mains. However, the public was not fooled and soon began sardonically referring to the V-2s as "flying gas pipes".

By October the offensive became sustained. A particularly devastating strike was on 25 November 1944, when a V-2 exploded at the Woolworths store in New Cross Road, killing 168 people and seriously injuring 121. Intercepting the supersonic V-2 missiles in flight proved virtually impossible, and other countermeasures, such as bombing the launch sites, were fairly ineffectual. Sustained bombardment continued until March 1945. The final missiles arrived on 27 March 1945, with one of them killing 134 people and injuring 49 when it hit a block of flats in Stepney.

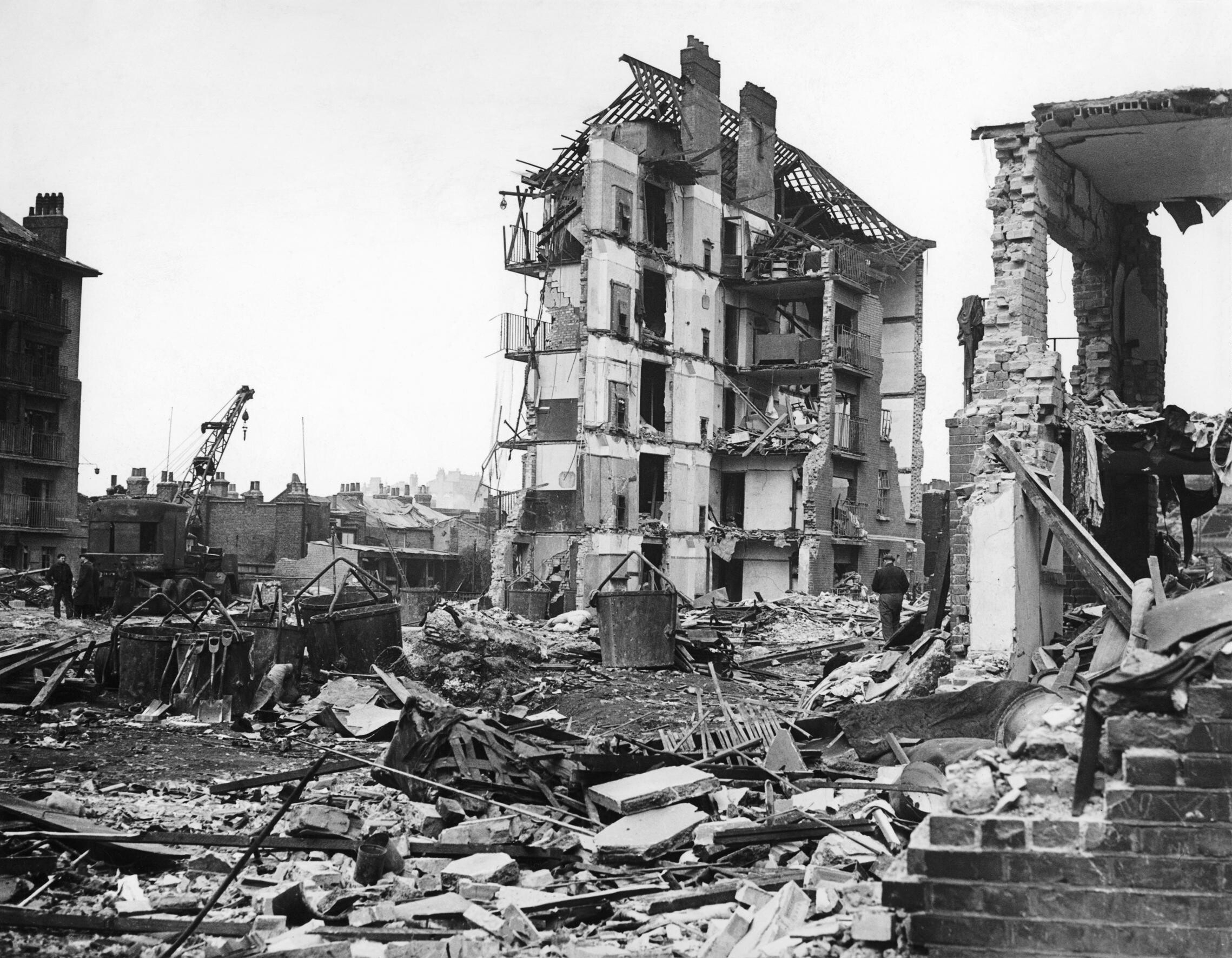
Ruined buildings in London, left by the penultimate V-2 to strike the city on 27 March 1945; the rocket killed 134 people

1,115 V-2s were fired at the United Kingdom. The vast majority of them were aimed at London, though about 40 targeted (and missed) Norwich. They killed an estimated 2,754 people in London, with another 6,523 injured. A further 2,917 service personnel were killed as a result of the V-weapon campaign. Since the V-2 was supersonic and could not be heard (and was rarely seen) as it approached the target, its psychological effect "suffered in comparison to the V-1".

The V-weapon offensive ended in March 1945, with the last V-2 landing in Kent on March 27, and the last enemy-action incident of any kind on British soil occurred at 09:00 on 29 March 1945 when a V-1 struck a Hertfordshire field. In terms of casualties, their effects had been less than their inventors hoped or their victims feared, though the damage to property was extensive, with 20,000 houses a day being damaged at the height of the campaign, causing a massive housing crisis in south-east England in late 1944 and early 1945.

The existential horror of the V-2 attack on London is the theme of Thomas Pynchon's novel Gravity's Rainbow.

V-2s were launched against Antwerp and Liège in Belgium; the attack on Antwerp was to prevent use of the Port of Antwerp which was essential for Allied logistics. In the six months following liberation in September 1944, Belgian towns were targeted by German V-weapons. A total of 2,342 V-weapons (mostly of the more advanced V-2 type) fell in a 16-kilometre (9.9 mi) radius around Antwerp alone. A post-war SHAEF report estimated V-Bombs had been responsible for killing 5,000 people and injuring a further 21,000, mostly in the cities of Antwerp and Liège.

On 17 March 1945 eleven V-2 rockets were fired at the Ludendorf rail bridge across the Rhine at Remagen on Hitler's orders (see Battle of Remagen). This was the only time they were fired at a tactical target or at a target in Germany; the nearest hit to the target was 270 meters (890 ft) away; and one hit Cologne, 64 kilometers (40 mi) to the north. The General Staff were against their use as they were inaccurate and could kill German citizens and troops, but Hitler was desperate to destroy the Allied bridgehead across the Rhine. They were launched by Batterie SS Abt. 500 at Hellendoorn in the Netherlands, about 200 kilometers (120 mi) to the north.

=== V-3 ===
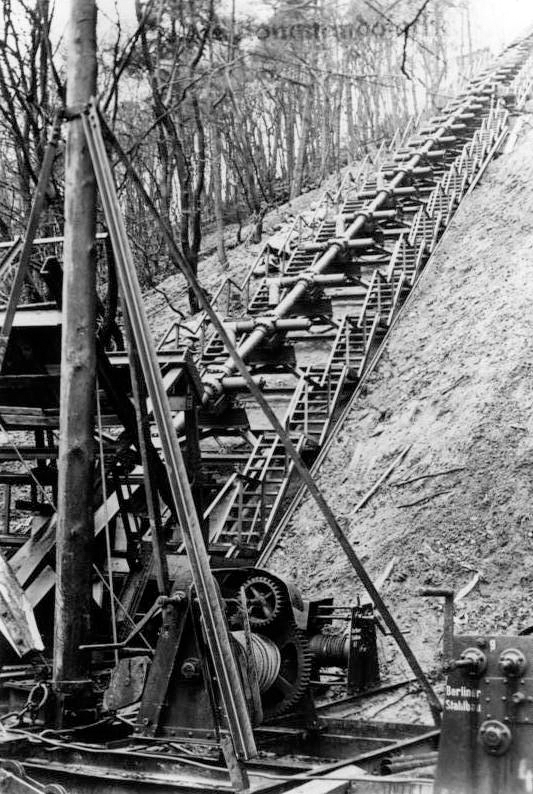
Prototype V-3

The V-3 cannon, also designed to fire on London, was never used for this purpose due to Allied attacks on the launch facilities, especially the fortress of Mimoyecques, and the offensive in northern Europe in 1944, overrunning the launch sites. Consequently, its use was diverted, in the winter of 1944, to bombard Luxembourg, with minimal result.

=== V-4 ===
The term V-4 has been applied by later writers to a number of projects and systems but in no case is this supported by period German documentation. Things it has been assigned to include the German nuclear program during World War II, the A9 rocket, and the Fieseler Fi 103R Reichenberg (a crewed version of the V-1 for suicide attacks).

The name has also been applied to a solid fuel rocket named the Rheinbote (Rhine Messenger). A salvo of 24 was fired at Antwerp on 24 December 1944, but they were "woefully inaccurate" and after another salvo was launched at the port, SS Lieutenant General Hans Kammler gave up on the programme.

== See also ==
- Aggregat series
- Peenemünde
- Operation Hydra (1943)
- Operation Most III
- Operation Crossbow
