= V-1 and V-2 intelligence =

Intelligence on Nazi German cruise missiles

V-1 and V-2 Intelligence
- Part of World War II technology & warfare
Location	European Theatre of World War II; External media: map of V-weapon sites
Result	~25% fewer V-1s struck the London Civil Defence Region due to Double Cross

Belligerents
United Kingdom; United States; Key Figures: UK: Reginald Victor Jones; USA: Allen Dulles	Nazi Germany: V-1: Max Wachtel; V-2: Walter Dornberger

Strength
PR Squadrons (5 UK, 5 USA, & 4 CA) agents & informants	V-1: 16 batteries of 220 men

Military intelligence on the V-1 and V-2 weapons developed by the Germans for attacks on the United Kingdom during the Second World War was important to countering them. Intelligence came from a number of sources and the Anglo-American intelligence agencies used it to assess the threat of the German V-weapons.

The activities included use of the Double Cross System for counter-intelligence and the British (code named) "Big Ben" project to reconstruct and evaluate German missile technology for which Denmark, Poland, Luxembourg, Sweden, and the USSR provided assistance. German counter-intelligence ruses were used to mislead the Allies about V-1 launch sites and the Peenemünde Army Research Center which were targeted for attacks by the Allies.

The Polish resistance Home Army (Armia Krajowa), which conducted military operations against occupying German forces, was also heavily involved in intelligence work. This included operations investigating the German Wunderwaffe: the V-1 flying bomb and the V-2 rocket. British intelligence received their first Polish report regarding the development of these weapons at Peenemünde in 1943.

== Early reports ==
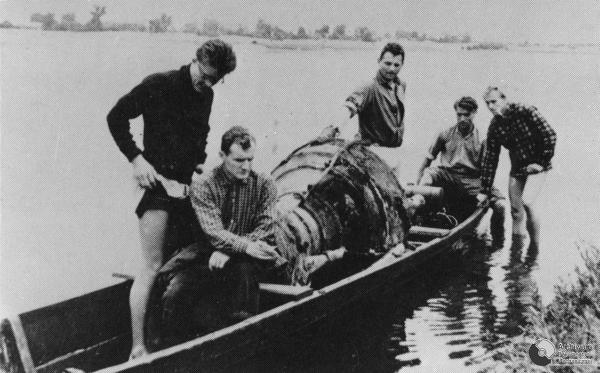
Part of a V-2 rocket recovered from the Bug River after the war

By the summer of 1941 Home Army intelligence began receiving reports from its field units regarding some kind of secret tests being carried out by the Germans on the island of Usedom in the Baltic Sea. A special "Bureau" was formed within intelligence group "Lombard", charged with espionage inside the 3rd Reich and the Polish areas incorporated into it after 1939, to investigate the matter and to coordinate future actions. Specialized scientific expertise was provided to the group by the engineer Antoni Kocjan, "Korona", a renowned pre-war glider constructor. Furthermore, as part of their operations the "Bureau" managed to recruit an Austrian anti-Nazi, Roman Traeger (T-As2), who was serving as an NCO in the Wehrmacht and was stationed on Usedom. Trager provided the AK with more detailed information regarding the "flying torpedoes" and pinpointed Peenemünde on Usedom as the site of the tests. The information obtained led to the first report from the AK to the British which was purportedly written by Jerzy Chmielewski, "Rafal", who was in charge of processing economic reports the "Lombard" group obtained.

== Operation Most III ==
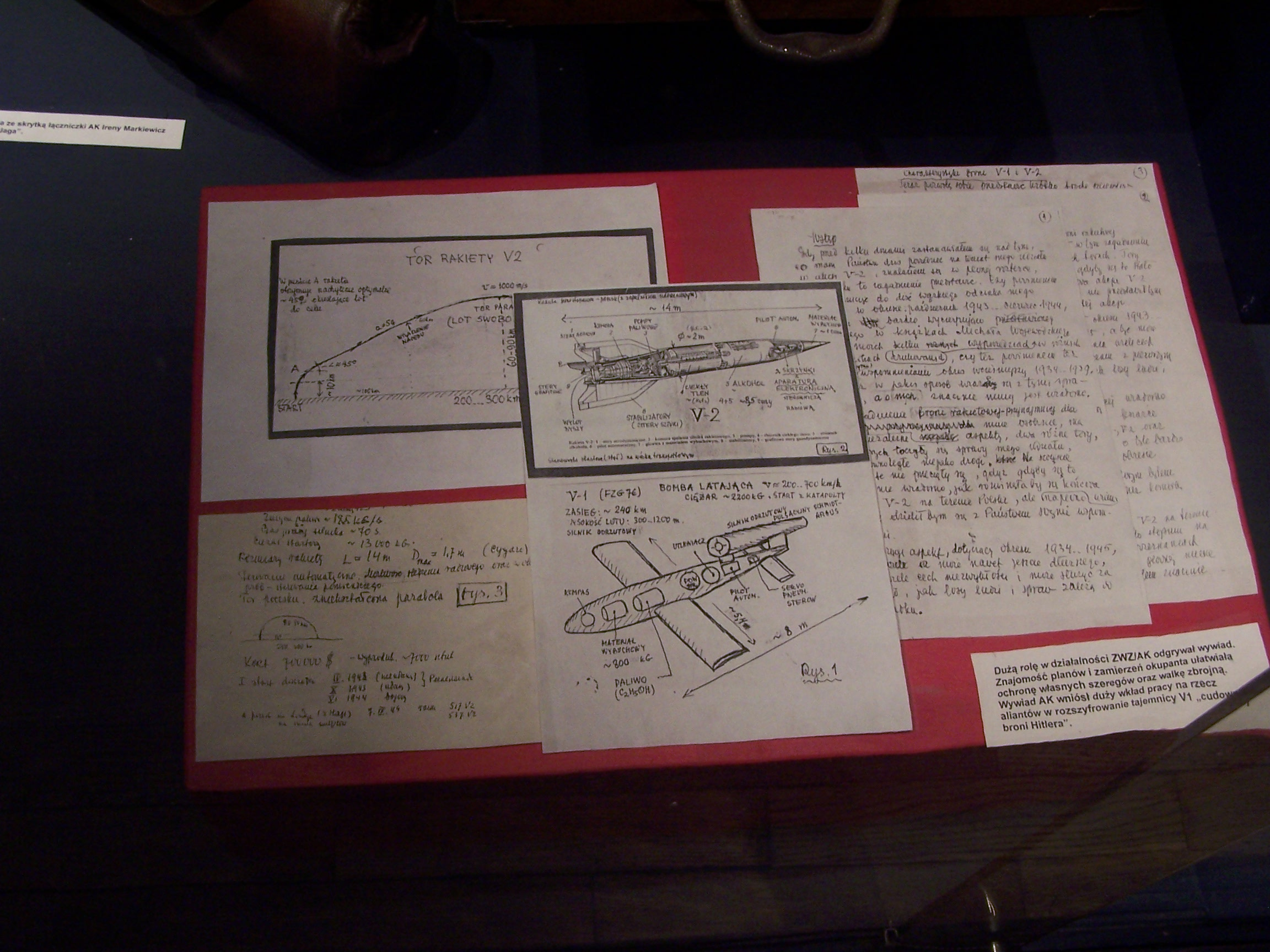
Intelligence reports on the V-1 and V-2

After V-2 flight testing began at the Blizna V-2 missile launch site (the first launch from there was on November 5, 1943), the AK had a unique opportunity to gather more information and to intercept parts of test rockets (most of which did not explode).

The AK quickly located the new testing ground at Blizna thanks to reports from local farmers and AK field units, who managed to obtain on their own pieces of the fired rockets, by arriving on the scene before German patrols. In late 1943 in cooperation with British intelligence, a plan was formed to make an attempt to capture a whole unexploded V-2 rocket and transport it to Britain.

At the time, opinion within British intelligence was divided. One group tended to believe the AK accounts and reports, while another was highly sceptical and argued that it was impossible to launch a rocket of the size reported by the AK using any known fuel. Then in early March 1944, British Intelligence Headquarters received a report of a Polish Underground worker (code name "Makary") who had crawled up to the Blizna railway line and saw on a flatcar heavily guarded by SS troops "an object which, though covered by a tarpaulin, bore every resemblance to a monstrous torpedo." The Polish intelligence also informed the British about usage of liquid oxygen in a radio report from June 12, 1944. Some experts within both British and Polish intelligence communities quickly realized that learning the nature of the fuel utilized by the rockets was crucial, and hence, the need to obtain a working example.

From April 1944, numerous test rockets were falling near Sarnaki village, in the vicinity of the Bug River, south of Siemiatycze. The number of parts collected by the Polish intelligence increased. They were then analyzed by the Polish scientists in Warsaw. According to some reports, around May 20, 1944, a relatively undamaged V-2 rocket fell on the swampy bank of the Bug near Sarnaki and local Poles managed to hide it before German arrival. Subsequently, the rocket was dismantled and smuggled across Poland. Operation Most III (Bridge III) secretly transported parts of the rocket out of Poland for analysis by British intelligence. The rocket parts and other pieces of cargo were transported hidden under hay in a horse pulled cart belonging to Jan Lechowicz.

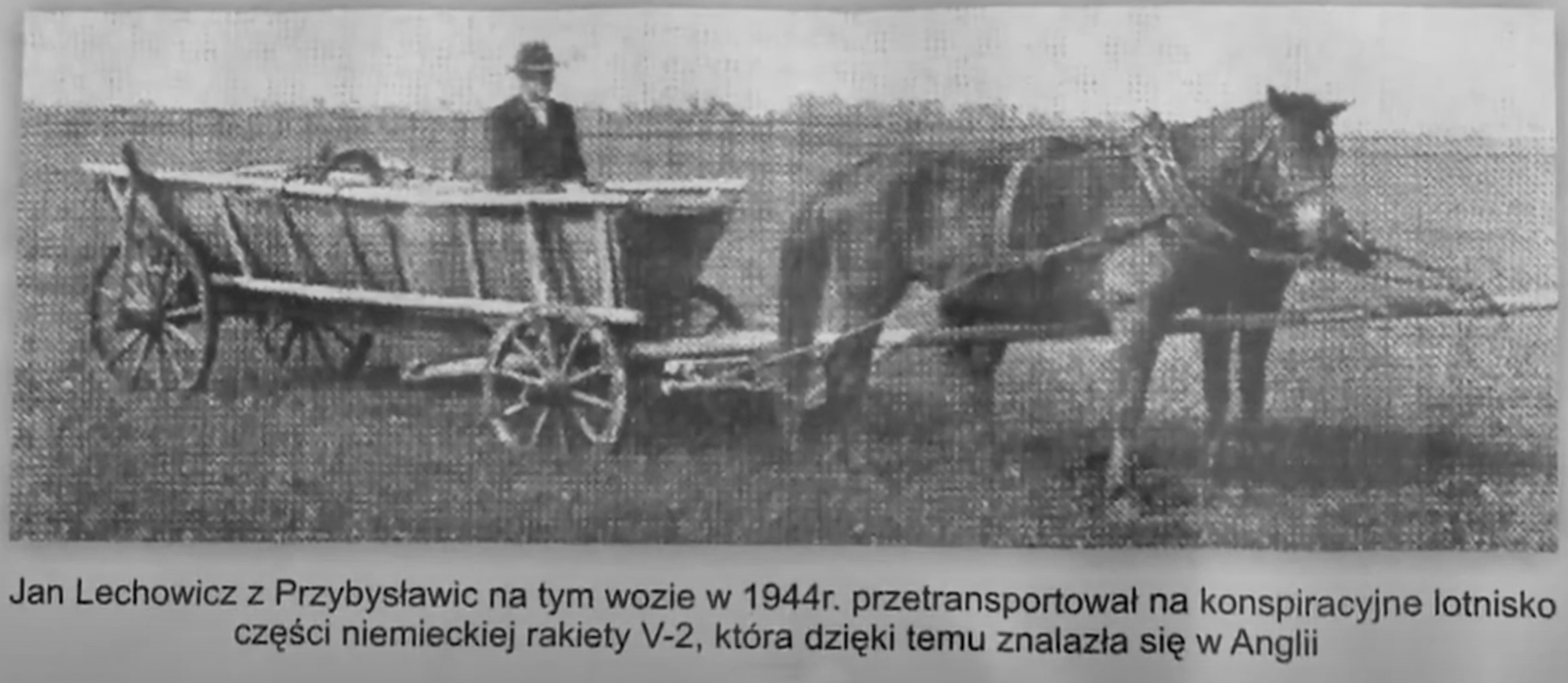
Jan Lechowicz from Przybysławice in 1944 transported parts of the German V-2 rocket to a makeshift airport. Thanks to that the parts of the rocket found themselves in England.

== Impact on the course of the war ==
While the early knowledge on a rocket by AK was quite a feat in pure intelligence terms, it did not necessarily translate into significant results on the ground. On the other hand, the AK did alert the British as to the dangers posed by both missile designs, which led them to allocate more resources to bombing production and launching sites and thus lessened the eventual devastation caused by them. Also, the Operation Hydra bombing raid on Peenemünde, purportedly carried out on the basis of Home Army intelligence, did delay the V-2 by six to eight weeks.

== Timeline ==
- Key
  - PR — aerial photographic reconnaissance
  - — exchange of early stray V2 rocket.
  - — events regarding Nazi Germany V-weapon planning
  - — locations in Occupied France (German: Nordfrankreich)
  - — Polish reports of the Armia Krajowa
  - — Reports gathered by the Luxembourg Resistance
  - , — events regarding Anglo-American intelligence
  - ,, — military operations (RAF, US, Luftwaffe)

Chronology
Date	Location/Topic	Event
2 November 1939	Oslo Report	German scientist Hans Ferdinand Mayer anonymously sent information and a sample of German technology to the British embassy in Oslo. He warned the British of current German technology including radar and planned German secret weapons such as rockets and winged missiles. Reception of the report was mixed with some believing it to be misdirection. Some of the information was second-hand and proved to be incorrect. "Head of the Scientific Section of M.I.6".
1941	Peenemünde	German scientist Paul Rosbaud and Norwegian XU agent Sverre Bergh submitted the first detailed description of the Peenemünde facilities and size/shape of missiles to British intelligence. Their reports were largely ignored until corroborated in 1943.
15 May 1942	Peenemünde: P-7	The Peenemunde research centre was photographed by a British photo-reconnaissance Supermarine Spitfire. The photographs showed "unusual" circular embankments but these were "dismissed".
5 January 1943	Peenemünde	Luxembourg Resistance members around Dr Fernand Schwachtgen ("John the Blind") and Pierre Ginter provide the British military intelligence for the first time with a smuggled sketch concerning information on the development of V1 rockets. This information were gathered by Luxembourgish forced laborers working at the Peenemünde Army Research Center and passed on to the Luxembourg resistance.
19 January 1943	Peenemünde	The US requested photo-reconnaissance of Usedom island.
22 March 1943		Wilhelm Ritter von Thoma, a General captured in North Africa campaign was secretly recorded while in a British prison. In conversation with a fellow prisoner-of-war he disclosed he had seen the launch of a "huge" rocket circa 1936-7.
22 April 1943	Peenemünde: P-7	de Havilland Mosquito DZ473 was carrying out bomb damage assessment on Stettin. On leaving Stettin, they left their cameras "running all down the north coast of Germany." The photograph interpreters at RAF Medmenham noticed an object of 25 ft (7.6 m) —an "enormous cloud of steam" that had disappeared 4 seconds later in the subsequent image. The "object" was both the cooling steam from leaky flame deflector pipes and the flames of a V-2 motor at the end of a test being directed horizontally by the P-7 flame trenches.
1943-05	Peenemünde	The senior US intelligence representative in Switzerland (Allen Dulles) identified Peenemünde to the US. In 1943, agent "George Wood" began providing Dulles with intelligence.
17 May 1943	Watten	After an agent had reported "enormous trenches" at Watten during April, photoreconnaissance showed the Nord-Pas-de-Calais site was "a large rail-, and canal-served clearing in the woods, possibly a gravel pit." The Watten blockhouse, which was being constructed for launching V-2s, was bombed for the first time on August 27, 1943 as a suspected V-1 flying bomb site.
14 May 1943	Peenemünde: P-7	Two sorties photographed an "unusually high level of activity" at "the Ellipse" (the Reich Director of Manpower was visiting for a V-2 test launch).
4 June 1943	Peenemünde	The Luxembourg Resistance provided R.V. Jones of the British military intelligence with additional smuggled sketches concerning the northwestern Usedom island as well as more detailed information concerning the Peenmünde Army Research Center. The information were gathered and passed via the "Famille Martin" network. Also in June, agent Leon Henri Roth at Peenemünde reported "development of a large rocket which made a noise resembling that of 'a squadron at low altitude." Luxembourgish forced laborers of the V-2 test center were housed at Camp Trassenheide, and two additional reports beginning in June from the camp (sent via Spain) identified the "rocket assembly hall", "experimental pit", and "launching tower".
1943-06-12	Peenemünde: P-7	Mosquito PR sortie N/853 showed: "a white-ish cylinder about 35 feet long and 5 or so feet in diameter with fins"
1943-06-22	France	A disgruntled officer in a German High Command weapons department reported "winged' missiles... Thirty catapults had been constructed...fifteen were already serviceable." At Peenemünde-West on December 24, 1942, the first ramp-launched V-1 traveled 3,000 yards and was the first flight powered by the Argus As 014 pulse jet engine.
1943-06-23	Peenemünde: P-7	PR by a No. 540 Squadron RAF Mosquito PR.4 showed two V-2s which were identified by interpreter André Kenny.
1943-06-29	Peenemünde	Churchill and the Cabinet Defence Committee (Operations) reviewed V-2 intelligence: "Peenemünde is ... beyond the range of our radio navigation beams and ... we must bomb by moonlight, although the German night fighters will be close at hand and it is too far to send our own. Nevertheless, we must attack it on the heaviest possible scale."
1943-07-26	Peenemünde	Mosquito PR prior to the Hydra attack detected new anti-aircraft guns and a row of six smoke generators.
1943-08-16	Peenemünde	Two days prior to the Operation Hydra bombing raid on the scientists quarters, workshops, and experimental facilities, a Westland Lysander picked up French agent Lèon Faye who carried "a detailed report of the top secret V-weapon rocket development at Peenemünde" to England.
1943-08-22	Denmark	An air-launched test of an overfuelled V-1 from the "G.A.F. Research Center, Karlshagen" (Peenemunde), crashed on Bornholm, and Hasager Christiansen obtained photos of the automatic pilot, compressed air cylinder, main fuselage and wings before the German recovery team arrived.
September 1943	Peenemünde: P-7	PR showed P-7 bomb craters, but Peenemünde personnel had fabricated post-Hydra bomb damage by creating craters in the sand, by blowing-up lightly damaged and minor buildings, and by painting "black and white lines to simulate charred beams". Research and development on the V-2 continued promptly despite Operation Hydra, and the next V-2 test launch was 49 days later.
1943-09-07	France	An Ultra intercept identified that an agent tasked with gathering rocket intelligence had been captured (Jeannie Rousseau "Amniarix" survived the war).
1943-09-19		The 'Questionnaire...to establish the practicability...of the German Long-Range Rocket' was distributed regarding the interpretation of V-2 intelligence: "it is not without precedent for the Germans to have succeeded while we doubted: the beams are a sufficient example." (September 25, R. V. Jones) vs. "at the end of the war, when we knew the full story we should find that the [60 ton] rocket was a mare's nest" (October 25, Lord Cherwell).
1943-09-28	V-3 cannon	The Central Interpretation Unit issued a report on the Marquise-Mimoyecques site (1st bombed November 5 as a suspected V-2 launch bunker).
1943-09-30		133 V-weapon facilities had been photographed by the PRU including V-1 flying bomb storage depots in Occupied France under construction since August. (They were not used for the modified sites.)
September 1943	France	After a Réseau AGIR informant reported unusual construction in Upper Normandy, Michel Hollard smuggled a report via Switzerland that identified six V-1 sites.
October 1943	Bois Carré	The Réseau AGIR reported the Bois Carré V-1 site (1.4 km east of Yvrench) had "a concrete platform with centre axis pointing directly to London". The network reconnoitered 104 V-1 facilities and provided rough sketches such as one by André Comps of Bois Carré. Comps copied the blueprints after Hollard had him infiltrate the site as a draughtsman.
3 October 1943	Siracourt	No. 542 Squadron RAF photographed the Siracourt bunker ( 1st bombed January 31, 1944).
1943 autumn		The PR image of a 40 ft × 7 ft (12.2 m × 2.1 m) object with "three [sic] fins" and a blunt nose (later identified as a V-2 without warhead) was code named Bodyline.
21 October 1943		PR was ordered for the whole of Northern France.
28 October 1943	Bois Carré	PR by Mosquito LR424 of No. 540 Squadron RAF was the first to show "ski-shaped buildings" at the Bois Carré (Yvrench) site.
3 November 1943	Bois Carré	PR by Mosquito on No. 541 Squadron RAF sortie E/463 confirmed existence of a concrete platform with axis pointing directly towards London, as informed by an agent infiltrating the Bois Carré (Yvrench) construction site.
28 November 1943	Peenemünde-West	Mosquito PR by Sqn Ldr Merrifield and F/O Whalley (scheduled by Jones for a likely V-1 launch time), photographed a "midget aircraft" on the ramp at the edge of the Peenemünde-West airfield, which Babington-Smith detected on December 1. An additional ramp was between Zinnowitz and Zempin, and the small aircraft was code named 'Peenemünde 20'.
November 1943	France	72 "ski sites" had been photographed.
4 December 1943		PR was again conducted across Northern France just before the December 5 start of "Crossbow Operations Against Ski Sites", which the Combined Chiefs of Staff authorized on December 2. The Ninth Air Force conducted the first attack (3 sites at Ligescourt), and the 1st major strike on ski sites by VIII Bomber Command was December 24.
4 December 1943	France	'Druides' agent Amniarix (Jeannie Rousseau) reported the V-1 organization was moving and being renamed from Flak Regiment 155W to Flak Gruppe Creil.
4 January 1944	The Pentagon Eglin Field	Brigadier Napier of the Ministry of Supply briefed the US military regarding German long range weapon intelligence, and General Ismay directed reports be shared with the US. The US "Crossbow Committee" under General Stephen Henry of the New Developments Division first met on January 6 after forming on December 29. In February and March, the US used technical intelligence data to build full-size replicas of ski site buildings to plan bombing tactics.
February 1944	Peenemunde: P-7	PR showed roads north of the ellipse that matched roadways later discovered after the Normandy Invasion at the Château de Molay V-2 site.
25 February 1944		The 1st transportable V-1 catapult ramp was ready (95 were ready by the end of March). Ramp sections built by the HWK in Kiel were hidden from PR until enough V-1s were ready for an initial assault. An October 22/23, 1943, area bombing had wrecked Kassel homes of Fieseler workers, delaying their transfer to the new V-1 plant at Rothwesten and as a result, delaying "the final trials of the [V-1] weapon's power unit, control-gear, diving mechanism, compass and air-log" until February and production for "three or four" months.
March 1944	France	A plan for underground concealment of a total of 5000 V-1s to supply 8 depots (each holding 250 more for the modified launchers) was initiated for Nucourt's limestone caves, Rilly-la-Montagne's rail tunnel, and Saint-Leu-d'Esserent's mushroom caves. Also in March, the Brécourt V-2 bunker was ordered to be converted to a V-1 bunker.
March 1944	occupied Poland	Intelligence headquarters received a Polish report of "an object which, though covered by a tarpaulin, bore every resemblance to a monstrous torpedo" on a Blizna railroad car that was heavily guarded by SS troops. The first V-2 training launch at Blizna had been on November 5, 1943, after Major Weber's experimental staff at Köslin and Experimental Battery 444 transferred to Blizna at the end of October. In May, the 953 (Semi-Mobile) Artillery Detachment started Abteilungen ("firing detachment") training at Blizna for operations at Wizernes, and Ultra decoded Enigma messages about the transfer to Blizna.
22 April 1944	France	The Crossbow Committee issued a revised ski site diagram based on a January 20 sketch. By the end of March, Anglo-American attacks had destroyed nine ski sites and seriously damaged 35 more. On April 19 at the request of the War Cabinet, General Eisenhower had designated Crossbow targets as the highest priority for the Combined Bomber Offensive.
26 April 1944	"Belhamelin, near Cherbourg"	PR identified the 1st camouflaged "modified" site, and 12 more were identified within days. The V-1 launch site design had been modified for simplicity and to use transportable catapult sections, making them "more difficult to discover and easy to replace", bombing more difficult, and completion time relatively short when V-1 supplies were sufficient. Crossbow continued bombing the obsolete and heavily damaged "ski sites" due to a German deception that portrayed them as being repaired. Additionally, espionage became more difficult as only German & prisoner/forced labor was used for "modified" sites instead of the previously used French construction firms.
April 1944	Mittelwerk	An intelligence report identified "Sixty flat cars left the plant; three cars had two rockets each in them." Reports came from 2 Polish laborers of the Mittelbau-Dora camp.
5 May 1944	Poland	PR of "the flying bomb compound" at Blizna contained an image of a rocket that R. V. Jones subsequently recognized on July 17.
6 June 1944	France	61 modified sites had been photographed, and 83 of 96 ski sites had been destroyed (only 2 of the ski sites launched V-1s).
10 June 1944	Belgium	A Belgian agent reported 33 railcars (carrying 99 V-1s) had passed through Ghent.
11 June 1944	Vignacourt	PR showed the Vignacourt modified site was being completed, which allowed image interpreters to predict sites would be ready to launch V-1s within 3 days
11 June 1944	Saleux	66 modified sites had been photographed. On the 13th just after midnight, the Saleux site launched the first combat V-1 (Hans Kammler visited the Saleux V-1 site on August 10).
1944-06	RAF Medmenham	A special Medmenham image interpretation section for site photographs was set up for Duncan Sandys.
13 June 1944		Stray test V2 rocket explodes over Bäckebo Sweden, fired from Peenemünde and aimed at Baltic sea outside island of Bornholm, but overshoots the target area and lands in south Sweden. Remains are shipped to the UK.
17 June 1944	Poland	An intel report identified apparatus 17053 was sent to Peenemünde from Blizna—launches of Mittelwerk V-2s 17001-17100 (January–April) were at both Peenemünde and Blizna.
30 June 1944	France	Anglo-American Intelligence had identified Nucourt and Saint-Leu-d'Esserent were underground V-1 storage. On June 15, 55 sites were launching V-1s, and in July, 38 sites launched 316 V-1s over a 24-hour period (25 crashed at launch). By July 10, Arthur Tedder had assigned 30 Crossbow targets to Arthur Harris' RAF Bomber Command, 6 to AEAF tactical airforce, and 68 to Carl Spaatz' USSTAF. Code named NOBALL, the targets numbered as high as 147 (i.e., "no ball V1 site No.147, Ligercourt [sic]").
1944-07-16		A report misidentified the likely rocket fuel was hydrogen peroxide (T-Stoff), and attacks were conducted on suspected sources.
1944-07-18		Adolf Hitler ruled the V-2 launch bunker plans could be abandoned. To reduce the risk of espionage and counterattacks, mobile firing batteries were subsequently used for launching and then leaving the site. An alternate concealment plan for firing V-2s just outside railway tunnels (code named Regenwurm) was also abandoned, as was an earlier plan that had constructed fixed concrete launch pads in clearings of Northern France.
July 1944	Wright Field	Experts fired a V-1 engine reconstructed from "Robot Blitz" wreckage (an entire V-1 was reconstructed at Republic Aviation by September 8).
21 July 1944		The British inaccurately interpreted the July 18–21 effort of 50 air-launched V-1s had been "ground-launched" from the Low Countries, particularly near Ostend.
22 July 1944		The Royal Aircraft Establishment at Farnborough issued a report on June 13 V-2 wreckage from Sweden for which the UK agreed to exchange Spitfires. The lack of lubricant in the wreckage's turbopump indicated cooling by a pumped liquefied gas, and intelligence reports about liquid oxygen as rocket fuel allowed the accurate interpretation that the payload was 2 tons or less. Conversely, the British mistakenly prepared radio jammers since the wreckage happened to have Wasserfall guidance control for a test (only a small portion of combat V-2s used radio motor cutoff—during ascent and with a 10 km interference range from the "firing point"). The test was for determining "the influence of the rocket jet on the guidance radio signal."
28 July 1944	Big Ben	Eight V-2 parts from Poland along with photographs, drawings, and Special Report 1/R no. 242 arrived in the UK from Brindisi, Italy. In Operation Most III an RAF Dakota had landed at an abandoned German airfield in Poland on July 25/26 and collected the 100 lb (45 kg) of cargo from the Polish underground. The Polish parts came from V-2s launched from Blizna (one had crashed near Sarnaki without exploding on May 20), and the underground had hidden wreckage in the Western Bug river. Antoni Kocjan prepared the Polish parts and information, which arrived after the British had already obtained similar material from the Swedish V-2 wreckage (as did Sanders' Blizna report). Most III also transported Jerzy Chmielewski, who had cycled 200 miles through enemy territory and reported the V-2 airbursts to the British.
31 July 1944		A dummy rocket and a Meillerwagen erector trailer captured at a V-2 storage site at Hautmesnil confirmed the size of the V-2.
15 August 1944	Double Cross System	Use of double agents to deceive the Luftwaffe into mis-aiming the V-1s continued despite risking civilians in one area over others. After the last V-1 launch in France on September 1, Canadian troops captured the last of the initial V-1 launch sites. Despite intelligence and countermeasures, V-1s killed/seriously injured over 6,000/17,000 UK civilians, even when only ~1/4 of the V-1s launched at England struck successfully. Over 8000 V-1s were launched at London (2,448 at Antwerp)—2340 reached the London Civil Defence Region from France, and by June 27 in the UK, "over 200,000 houses had been damaged or destroyed by the V-1... and shattered sewage systems threatened serious epidemics."
25 August 1944		Plans for aerial reconnaissance of V-2 sites were included in the joint "Plan for Attack on the German Rocket Organization When Rocket Attacks Commence". Based on rocket fuel intelligence the plan also identified primary and secondary liquid-oxygen plants as the third priority targets Mission 572 on August 24 had targeted rocket fuel production in France and Belgium.
25 August 1944	Belgium	Based on the intelligence of V-2 liquid oxygen, the Eighth Air Force bombed 5 LOX plants (the next day's mission was "to hit liquid oxygen plants at La Louvière, Torte and Willebroek").
8 September 1944	Sound ranging	Microphones in East Kent reported the times of the first London V-2s: 18:40:52 and 18:41:08 (at different locations, both Jones and Duncan Sandys recognized the supersonic "double-crack"). The ranging system provided the V-2 "trajectory from which the general launching area could be determined." Civil defense officials refused to give any public information about the rocket ("It might have been a gas main explosion"), and despite that day's German headline— Vergeltungswaffe-2 Gegen London im Einsatz ("Vengeance Weapon 2 in Action Against London")—the British's official SECRET statement was that "BIG BEN" had not been "CONFIRMED".
17 September 1944	Netherlands	Airfields suspected as He 111 bases for V-1 air-launches were attacked (airfields were bombed at Hopsten, Leeuwarden, Steenwijk, and Rheine). Modified V-1s were air-launched from September 16-January 14 (865 launches). On October 21, the first V-1 launches for Operation Donnerschlag ("Thunderclap") began from Germany.
22 September 1944	Poland	After the Soviets captured Blizna in July and the Anglo-American Sanders Mission arrived on September 3, Colonel T.R.B Sanders issued his preliminary report.
1944-10	Mittelwerk	PR of Niedersachswerfen showed shadows of railcars consistent with those loaded with V-2s.
25 October 1944	Netherlands	An informant arrived behind Allied lines with reports of V-2 launches from Wassenaar.
December 1944	Royal Artillery	Project Firework was enacted by the 11th Survey Regiment to watch for "all data obtained regarding the origin and flight of enemy rockets" with the use of sound ranging stations and, after modification, the radar stations at Swingate, Rye, Pevensey, Poling, and Ventnor (No. 11 Group RAF); and Branscombe, Ringstead, and Southbourne (No. 10 Group RAF) along with the pair at St Lawrence and Newchurch. Radar allowed London Transport to be warned when the predicted impact (5 mile accuracy) was near the Thames subway tunnels.
31 December 1944	Netherlands	At the home of 14 yr old Hans van Wouw Koeleman, who observed and reported a few Dutch coast launches of V-2s, his father toasted the "favourable results the Germans had achieved that night" when a V-2 launch just prior to midnight "to wish Londoners a Happy New Year" failed and hit a German barracks.
8 February 1945	Peenemünde	Ten Soviet prisoners led by Mikhail Devyatayev escape from the concentration camp on Usedom by stealing the camp commander's plane, which contained special equipment for tracking V-2 launches. They tell how Germans hide V-2 launch sites on the island using movable trees.
20 March 1945	Netherlands	After PR showed V-1 sites at Ypenburg and Vlaardingen, an RAF Fighter Command squadron attacked the former, while on the 23rd the RAF Second Tactical Air Force attacked the latter.
March 1945	Operation Paperclip	A Polish laboratory technician found pieces of the Osenberg List of German scientists in a toilet at Bonn University. The United States Army Ordnance Corps used the Osenberg List to compile the list of rocket scientists to be captured and interrogated (Wernher von Braun's name was at the top).
11 April 1945	Mittelwerk	After intelligence had said to "expect something a little unusual" at Nordhausen, the Army found the underground factory rockets, the dead Boelcke Kaserne forced laborers, and the evacuated Dora concentration camp. In June 1945, a mission led by the British engineer Roy Fedden inspected the factory. Earlier 1944 technical inspections included one by Frédéric Joliot-Curie and Duncan Sandys to Watten on September 10 and one by Colonel T.R.B. Sanders to Wizernes in November. Similarly in July 1944, both Eisenhower and Churchill had visited the Brécourt bunker – the latter reportedly dropping an apple he was eating in astonishment of the massive facility.

The day after Strategic Bombing Directive No. 4 ended the strategic air war in Europe, the use of radar was discontinued in the London Civil Defence Region for detecting V-2 launches. The last launches had been on March 27 (V-2) and March 29 (V-1 flying bomb).

== See also ==
- Battle of the V-1
