= Test Stand VII =

Rocket testing site used by Nazi Germany during World War II

- German: Prüfstand VII
- Part of Army Research Center Peenemünde, Nazi Germany
- Usedom island
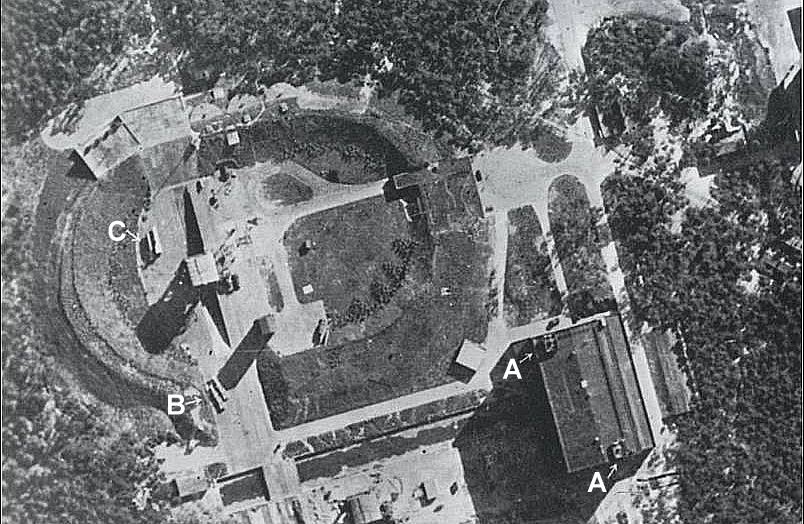
- 23 June 1943 RAF reconnaissance photo of Test Stand VII

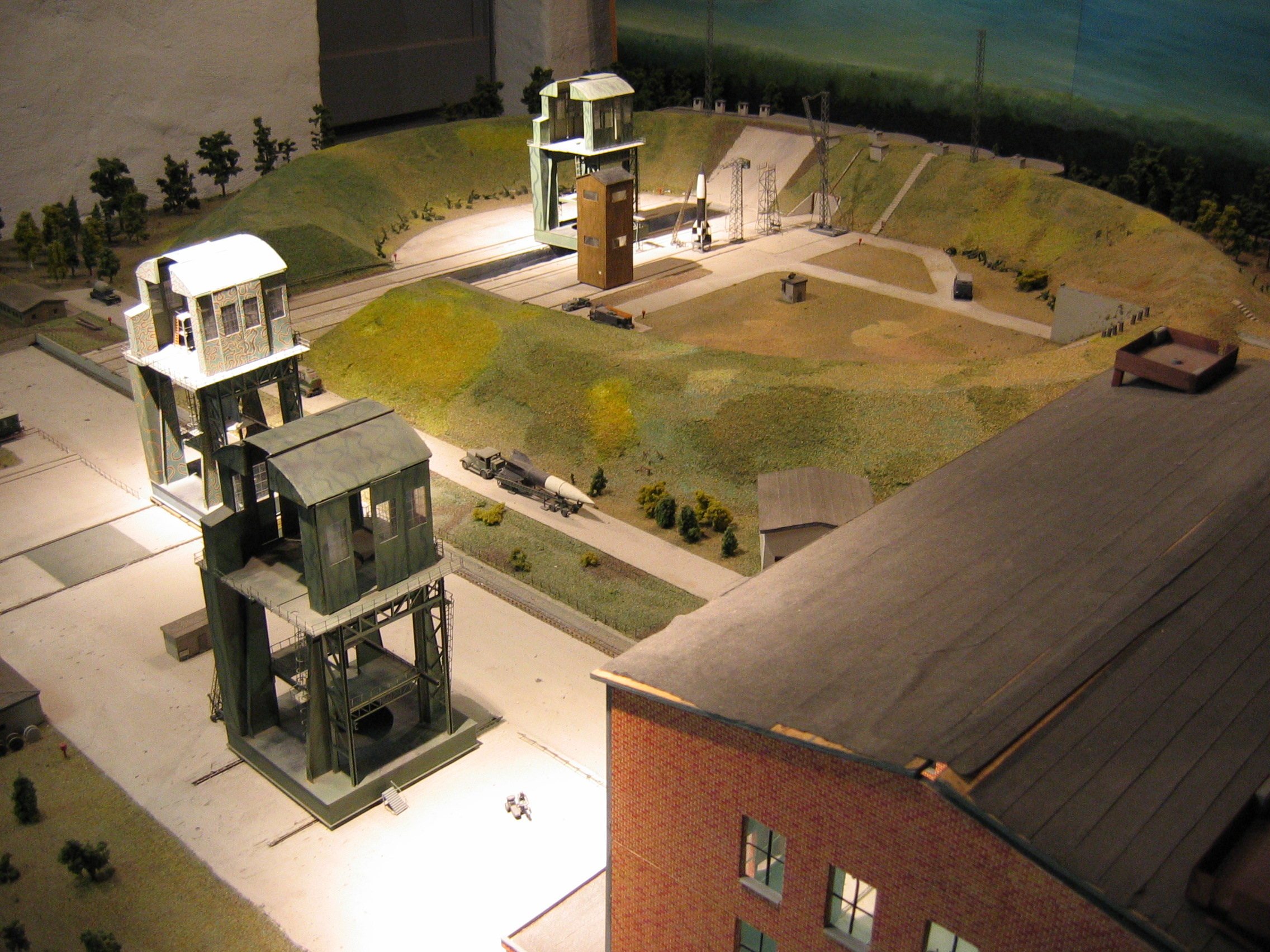
- Diorama at Peenemünde Historical and Technical Information Centre

Site information
- Type: bunker
- Open to the public: Peenemünde Historical and Technical Information Centre
- Condition: demolished

Location
- Coordinates: 54°10′06″N 13°48′03″E
- Height: 10 m (33 ft) hohe Bóschung

Site history
- Built: 1938
- Built by: HVP
- In use: World War II
- Materials: sand, concrete, brick, steel
- Demolished: 1961
- Battles/wars: Operation Crossbow, Operation Hydra
- Events: DERA rocket model club launches

Garrison information
- Past commanders: Engineers in Charge: Fritz Schwarz (1943), Hartmut Kuechen (through May 1944), followed by Dieter Huzel, then Dr. Kurt H. Debus.

Test Stand VII (German: Prüfstand VII, P-7) was the principal V-2 rocket testing facility at Peenemünde Airfield and was capable of static firing rocket motors with up to 200 tons of thrust. Notable events at the site include the first successful V-2 launch on 3 October 1942, visits by German military leaders, and Allied reconnaissance overflights and bombing.

== Description ==
Two distinguishing features of P-7 were the 670-yard-long elliptical high-sloped sand wall and the wide concrete-lined trench (flame pit) with a large symmetrical water-cooled flame deflector of molybdenum-steel pipes. The concrete trench, nearly 25 feet (7.6 m) wide with 3 feet (0.91 m) concrete walls, sloped gradually away from each side of the flame deflector to a depth of 20 feet (6.1 m), rising again symmetrically toward the side of the arena. Beside the flame pit was a long underground room where 4 feet (1.2 m) diameter delivery pipes were housed to route cooling water at 120 gallon per second from three huge pumps in the pumphouse to the flame deflector in the pit.

While the elliptical sand wall was for blocking high sea winds and blown sand, concrete structures were integrated into the wall and under the ground to protect equipment and personnel from rocket explosions and enemy bombing (a sand-filled dummy warhead, called "the elephant", was normally used). A large gap in the wall allowed easy entry by vehicles (particularly railcars with propellants), and an open tunnel through the ellipse wall at the narrower southern end also allowed entry. Integrated into the ellipse wall next to the tunnel was a massive observation and measuring blockhouse containing the control center. The control center had a double door with a bulletproof glass window from which an observer maintained telephone communication with the Telemetering Building at a remote location from P-7. A receiver in a lighthouse near Koserow provided telemetry from rockets with the Wolman System for Doppler tracking. For rockets that used radio control for V-2 engine cutoff, the Brennschluss equipment included a transmitter on the bank of the Peene about 7.5 miles (12.1 km) from P-7 and the Doppler radar at Lubmin (a motorized Würzburg radar, the "rhinoceros").

=== Control room ===
The control room also had switchboards, a row of four periscopes, manometers, frequency gauges, voltmeters and ammeters, green/red/white signal lamps, and switches at the propulsion console and guidance panel to dynamically display approximately 15 measurement points within the rocket. Additionally, the control room had a big "X-time" countdown clock that displayed the time until launch, which was announced via loudspeakers as "X minus four minutes", etc. In addition to the control room, the blockhouse also contained offices, a conference room, a small dormitory with double bunks and an adjoining shower, a wash room, and a workshop. A long underground corridor led from the measurement blockhouse to a room in the concrete foundation by the flame pit, and multiple rows of measurement cables covered the walls of the tunnel. A different gradually rising tunnel led from the long flame pit room to the exterior of the arena near the pumphouse (German: Pumpenhaus). Near the pumphouse were high wooden towers to cool the water, and 25 feet (7.6 m) high tanks for the recooling water were integrated into the ellipse wall.

=== Test tower ===
The prominent tower within the arena was a mobile test frame/crane (Fahrbare Kranbühne) which could be moved over the flame pit to position the rocket nozzle 25 feet above the deflector, and which allowed an entire missile to be gimbaled in two directions up to five degrees from vertical. The tower included an elevator and a German-made Toledo scale for thrust measurements. Actual launches were from a steel table-like structure (firing stand, Brennstand) across the railway from the flame pit on the test stand's large concrete foundation. Under the concrete foundation were the recorder room, a small shop, an office, compressed nitrogen storage cylinders, and catch tanks. The arena also included an engine cold-calibration pad for conducting flow test measurements by pumping water (instead of Liquid oxygen) and alcohol (which was recovered afterward) via the turbopump through the combustion chamber. Since the V-2 motor had no controller for the turbopump, cold-calibration allowed the determination of "freak cases" of equipment.

Launch Failure Description

The heavy missile ... rose only 15 feet above the firing table. Then it stood still! It stood upright in the air, showing no desire to turn over or to revolve about its longitudinal axis. It was an unbelievable sight. At any moment the rocket would topple or fall back, crash and explode. ... But I still kept my binoculars on the rocket. ... There must have been an interruption in the output of the steam generator for the propellant-pump turbine. ... The film operator, Kühn, had taken up position facing me on the [elliptical] wall of the test stand. He must have had good nerves. The rocket hung in the air just 100 yards away.[from Kühn] Nothing daunted, ... He certainly knew from experience that the moment the projectile fell back he would be in mortal danger. He just went on cranking. ... Our exhaust vanes were doing a wonderful job. The rocket stood unsupported in the air, as straight as a ramrod. Only 4 seconds had passed, ... The rocket was bound to topple now. The tilt [for trajectory control] would now begin automatically. ... The rocket grew lighter owing to the steady fuel consumption. Almost imperceptibly, yard by yard, it began to climb. Its nose turned very gradually eastward. ... At a height of 30 to 40 feet it moved slowly, still practically upright, toward the cameraman. He went on cranking. I caught my breath. Just a little more tilt and the rocket would certainly capsize and explode ... Now it was over the wall. Kühn knelt down and pointed his camera almost straight upward. It was going to be some film! ... I knew what was bound to come. ... I saw him get up slowly, still cranking. His camera was now practically horizontal. Then he pointed it diagonally down from the high wall. Boom! ... Smoke, flames, fragments of sheet-metal, branches, and sand whirled through the air. The rocket had crashed ... 40 yards beyond the wall ... The cameraman was still cranking. ... I was filled with an immense pride. ... only with men like this, could we finish the job that lay before us.

— Walter Dornberger, c. 1943

=== Hangar ===
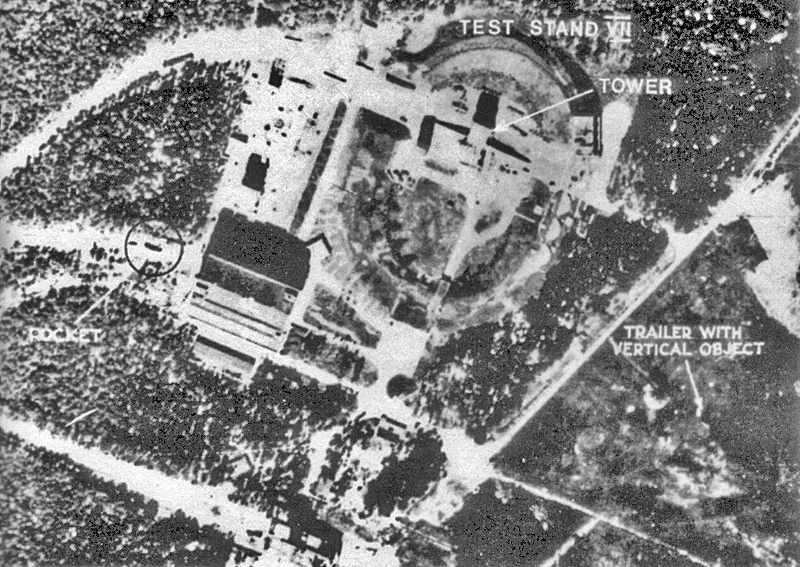
12 June 1943 RAF reconnaissance photo of Test Stand VII

Outside of the arena was the 150x185x100h foot assembly and preparation hall/hangar (German: Montagehalle), which had been designed to be able to handle a larger A9/A10 multi-stage rocket that was planned, but never built. The roof of the hangar had camera stations for filming events.

== Allied reconnaissance and bombing ==
On 15 May 1942 after photographing German destroyers berthed at the port of Kiel, Spitfire pilot Flight Lieutenant D. W. Stevenson photographed 'heavy construction work' near the Peenemünde aerodrome. Later in the month Constance Babington Smith decided the scale was too small ... then something unusual caught my eye ... some extraordinary circular embankments ... I then dismissed the whole thing from my mind. Then a year later on 22 April 1943, Bill White and Ron Prescott in RAF de Havilland Mosquito DZ473 were sent from Leuchars to photograph damage from Allied bombing at the Stettin railyards: "On leaving Stettin, we left our cameras running all down the north coast of Germany, and when the film was developed, it was found to contain pictures of Peenemünde." The Medmenham interpreters studied the elliptical earthworks (originally photographed in May 1942) and noticed an "object" 25 feet (7.6 m) long projecting from what was thought to be a service building, although it had mysteriously disappeared on the next frame.

On 22 April 1943 a large cloud of steam was photographed near the embankments, which was later identified as coming from a rocket engine being test fired. Duncan Sandys' first photographic reconnaissance report on Peenemünde was circulated on 29 April 1943, which identified that the lack of power-station activity (Germany had installed electrostatic dust and smoke removers on the power station near Kölpin) indicates that "The circular and elliptical constructions are probably for the testing of explosives and projectiles. ... In view of the above, it is clear that a heavy long-range rocket is not an immediate threat." Then on 14 May, an "unusually high level of activity" was visible at "the Ellipse" on photos from two sorties on 14 May, which was the date the Reich Director of Manpower (Gauleiter Fritz Sauckel) was a distinguished visitor at a launch. The first solid evidence of the existence of a rocket came with a sortie (N/853) on 12 June, when a Spitfire flown by Sqn Ldr Gordon Hughes photographed Peenemünde: one photograph included an object on a railway truck. Reginald Victor Jones identified the object on 18 June as "a whitish cylinder about 35 feet long and 5 or so feet in diameter with a bluntish nose and fins at the other end...I had found the rocket." After Operation Hydra bombed other areas of Peenemünde in 1943, the P-7 blockhouse roof was reinforced, and in a 1944 raid, the blockhouse occupants suffered one injury when a periscope fell. (Hermann Weidner's Test Stand 8 was lost in the 1944 July and August raids).

The last V-2 launch at Peenemünde was in February 1945, and on 5 May 1945, the 2nd Belorussian Front under General Konstantin Rokossovsky captured the port of Swinemünde and the Usedom island. Russian infantry under Major Anatole Vavilov stormed Peenemünde and found it "75 per cent wreckage" (the research buildings and test stands had been demolished.) A former adjutant at Peenemünde, Oberstleutnant Richard Rumschöttel, and his wife were killed during the attack, and Vavilov had orders to destroy the facility.

External image
- Bombing damage
