= Jeannie Rousseau =

French spy in World War II (1919–2017)

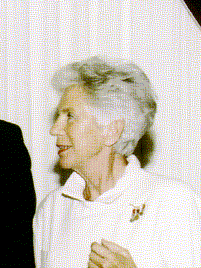
- Jeannie Rousseau
- Born: 1 April 1919; Saint-Brieuc, Côtes-d'Armor, France
- Died: 23 August 2017 (aged 98); Montaigu, France
- Spouse: Henri de Clarens

Jeannie Yvonne Ghislaine Rousseau, married name Jeannie de Clarens, (1 April 1919 – 23 August 2017) was an Allied intelligence agent in occupied France during World War II, a member of the "Druids" network led by Georges Lamarque.

Codenamed Amniarix, she evaded Gestapo agents while gathering crucial information on the Germans' emerging rocket weapons programs from behind enemy lines. Her intelligence reports, forwarded to London, led directly to the British raid on Peenemünde and to delays and disruptions in the V-1 and V-2 programs, saving many thousands of lives in the West. Rousseau was captured twice and spent time in three concentration camps. After the war, she worked as a freelance interpreter.

== Early life ==
Born on 1 April 1919 in Saint-Brieuc, Côtes-d'Armor, Jeannie Yvonne Ghislaine Rousseau was the daughter of Jean Rousseau, a World War I veteran and a French foreign ministry official, and his wife Marie, née Le Charpentier. A brilliant linguist, she graduated in languages from Sciences Po in 1939. After the outbreak of World War II, she moved with her family to Dinard, in Ille-et-Vilaine, where the mayor, a friend of her parents, asked her to work as an interpreter to facilitate negotiations between the local services and the German authorities.

== Wartime work ==
Rousseau began gathering intelligence on German operations even before she made contact with Allied intelligence. She took a job at the French national chamber of commerce as a translator and soon became the organization's top staffer, meeting regularly with the German military commander's staff. She was a frequent visitor with the Germans, discussing commercial issues, such as complaints about Nazi commandeering or offers to sell them goods, such as steel and rubber. "I was storing my nuts, but I had no way to pass them on." She was arrested by the Gestapo in January 1941, but was later released for lack of evidence and was forced to leave the area, though prohibited from staying in the coastal area.

In 1941 she moved to Paris where she began working for a Parisian company that supplied materials to the German war effort, thus positioning herself as a source of valuable information for the Allied forces.

Her formal career as a spy began in 1941, with a chance meeting with Georges Lamarque on a night train from Paris to Vichy. Lamarque remembered Rousseau from the University of Paris, where she had shown talent in languages, including German, and finished first in her class, in 1939. He asked her to work for him, and she immediately agreed.

During 1943, she filed, among other reports two particularly remarkable ones about Peenemünde. These reports led R.V. Jones, and ultimately, the rest of the British government and the rest of the Allies, directly to the missile and rocket development work going on there. Her collection and forwarding of this intelligence under very difficult circumstances led, through Jones' analysis and persuasive abilities in London, to British air raids on Peenemünde. Although several prominent sources incorrectly claim or imply that Rousseau's report led to the major raid on Peenemünde on August 17/18 1943, her report did not reach R.V. Jones until after that date. These accounts also falsely imply that her main contribution related to the V-2, but she was connected to Max Wachtel's V-1 group and it was her report that first revealed Wachtel's V-1 testing site on nearby Zempin, which was not targeted in the August 17th/18th raid. The Allies knew about the V-2s and Peenemünde before her first report. R.V. Jones relates that when he first inquired about the source of the extraordinary report that had originally tipped off the British government to what was going on at Peenemünde, all he learned was that it came from "one of the most remarkable young women of her generation," part of a small espionage network reporting from occupied France.

Shortly before D-Day, a plan to evacuate her and two other agents was foiled by the Gestapo: she was arrested at La Roche-Derrien on April 28, 1944. She was the first to be caught, but even as she was being captured she warned her comrades and one escaped. First imprisoned and interrogated at Jacques Cartier prison in Rennes, she was deported from Pantin in August 1944 to Ravensbrück. From there she was sent to the Torgau labour camp where she organised a demonstration to protest against the use of prisoners in the manufacture of ammunition. As Jones put it: "AMNIARIX's reports stand brilliantly in the history of intelligence, and three concentration camps — Ravensbruck, Königsberg (a punishment camp), and Torgau could not break her." She was rescued by the Swedish Red Cross shortly before the end of the war.

== Life after the war ==
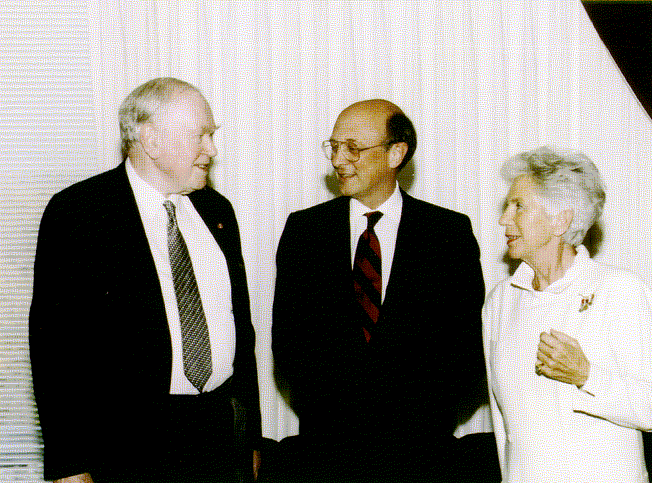
Jeanne de Clarens with James Woolsey (centre) and Reginald Victor Jones in 1992

While recovering in Sweden from tuberculosis contracted during her imprisonment, Rousseau met Henri de Clarens, who had been in the Buchenwald and Auschwitz concentration camps. The two married and had two children. De Clarens died in 1995.

Rousseau worked as a freelance interpreter after the war, for the United Nations and other agencies. Avoiding interviews with reporters and historians, her story remained largely untold. In 1993, then as Madame Jeannie de Clarens, she agreed to accept the Central Intelligence Agency's Agency Seal Medal. She revealed more details of her story to journalist David Ignatius in 1998. Other awards included the Legion of Honour in 1955, supplemented by the grand officer medal in 2009. Rousseau also received the Resistance Medal and the Croix de guerre.

Rousseau died on 23 August 2017 in Montaigu, in Vendée, aged 98.

== See also ==
- V-1 and V-2 Intelligence
