= Peenemünde Airfield =

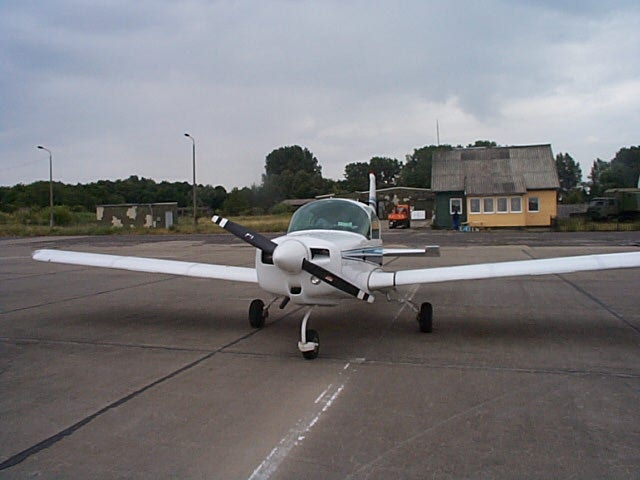
- AA5 Traveller at Peenemünde airfield
- IATA: PEF; ICAO: EDCP

Summary
- Airport type: Public
- Operator: Usedomer Fluggesellschaft mbH
- Location: Usedom
- Elevation AMSL: 7 ft (2.1 m)
- Coordinates: 54°09′28″N 013°46′22″E
- Interactive map of Peenemünde Airfield

Runways
Direction	Length		Surface
Direction	ft	m	Surface
13T/31T	7,874	2,400	Concrete

Peenemünde Airfield (IATA: PEF, ICAO: EDCP) is an airfield on the Baltic Sea coast, north of Peenemünde, Germany. Today, round trips in light aircraft are available from Peenemünde Airfield. There are also bus tours which visit the former shelters of the East German National People's Army (NVA) and the remnants of the V-1 flying bomb facilities. Because of its long runway, the airfield is also a location for flight schools.

== History ==
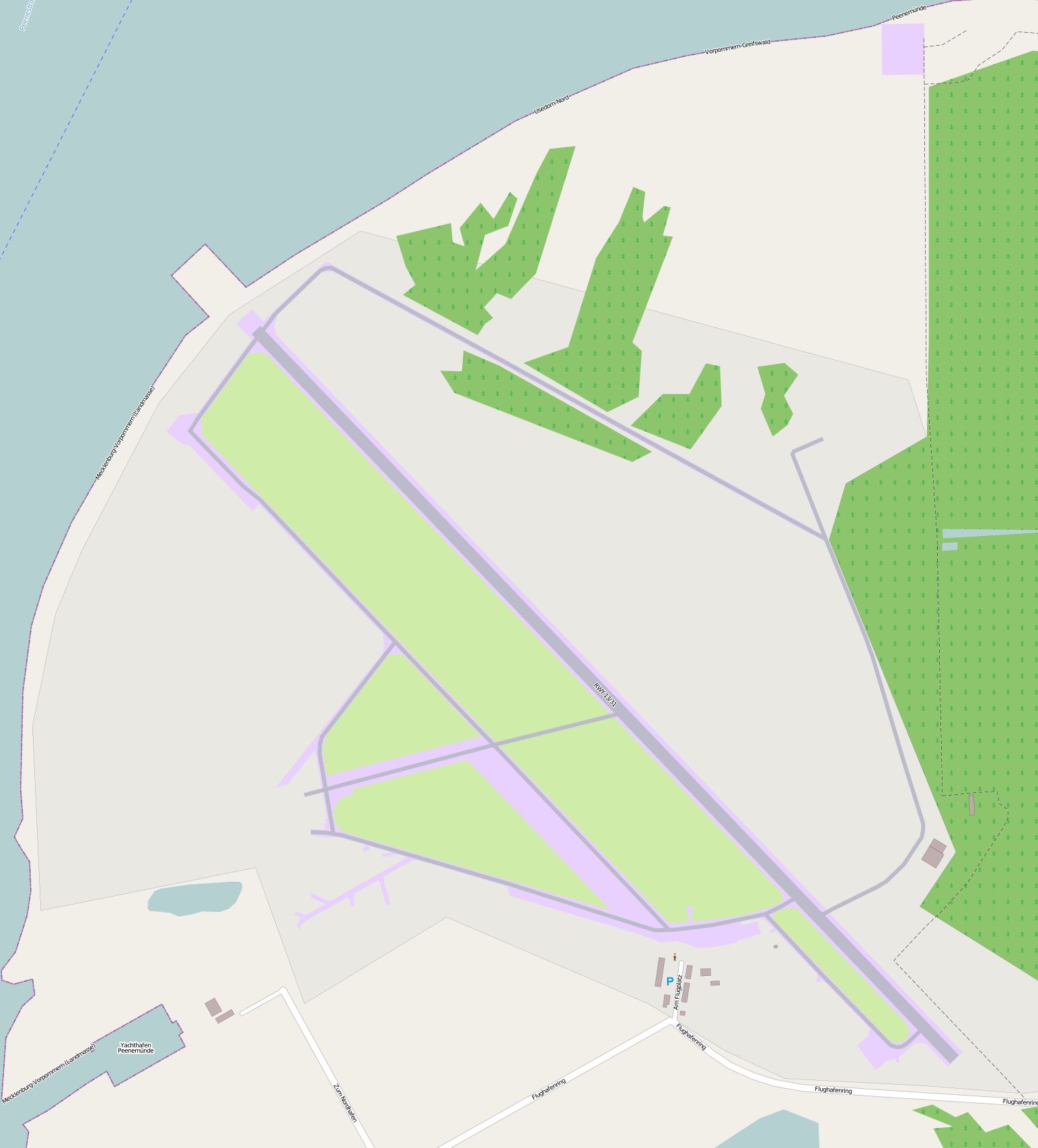
Peenemünde Airfield

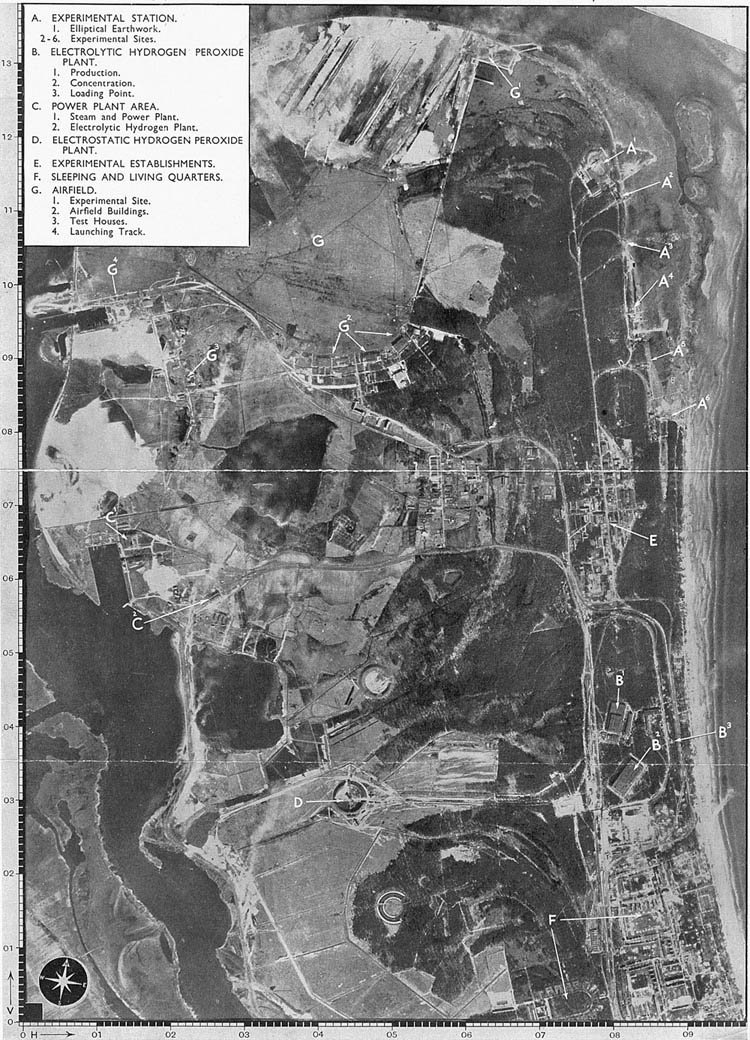
April 1943 reconnaissance image of Usedom island, with airfield at upper left

On 2 April 1936 the Reich Air Ministry paid 750,000 ℛ︁ℳ︁ to the town of Wolgast for the whole northern peninsula of Usedom. The airfield began service on 1 April 1938, and on the same date, the Air Ministry officially separated Peenemünde-West from the joint command that included the adjacent Army Research Center Peenemünde.

As Werk West, the Luftwaffe Test Site (German: Erprobungsstelle der Luftwaffe) and under control of the central Erprobungsstelle Rechlin facility inland, the Peenemünde-West coastal facility was used for testing experimental aircraft (Erprobungsflugzeuge) such as the Heinkel He 176 (flown at Peenemünde on 20 June 1939) and the Messerschmitt Me 163 rocket-powered fighter (code named 'Peenemünde 30' by British intelligence – the '30' referring to the object's measured wingspan in feet). At the northeast edge of the concrete airfield was a launch ramp for testing the V-1 flying bomb and on which, in 1943, RAF officer Constance Babington Smith, working at RAF Medmenham, detected a small winged aircraft ('Peenemünde 20') while viewing an Allied reconnaissance photograph. The airfield was also used for take-off of Heinkel He 111 for initial air-launch testing of V-1s. V-1 launch crew training was at the nearby resort of Zempin, and after the August 1943 Operation Hydra bombing of the area, V-1 flight testing was moved to Brüsterort. Peenemünde West also developed World War II night-navigation and radar systems (Dr. Johannes Plendl). After the 2nd Belorussian Front under General Konstantin Rokossovsky captured the Swinemünde port and Usedom island on 5 May 1945, the airfield became part of the Soviet Zone of Occupation.

=== Post-war ===
In 1956, the airfield received a new 2,465 metre-long concrete runway, which is oriented in a northwesterly-southeasterly direction and allows the operation of modern military jet planes. A further landmark is the collection of radio beacons at the northwest end, which were built on artificial islands in the sea. In 1961, the airfield was transferred to the National People's Army (NVA), which used it until 1990. The main unit was the Jagdfliegergeschwader 9 (JG-9) (English: Fighter Wing 9) with MiG-21 and later MiG-23 in different versions. From 1972 the Zieldarstellungskette 33 (ZDK-33) (roughly: Target Towing Flight 33) was also stationed at Peenemünde airfield. It was subordinated to the JG-9 and used Il-28 and later Aero L-39 to serve the anti-aircraft firing ranges Zingst and Ueckermünde. After 1990, the airfield was used among other things as a parking area for former NVA military vehicles. Since Summer 2010, a high-performance jet trainer aircraft Aero L-39 Albatros of the former NVA is back on Peenemünde Airfield.

== See also ==
- Peenemünde Army Research Center and Airfield
- World War II guided missiles of Germany
- Website of the Airfield (German)
