= Bombing of Peenemünde in World War II =

The bombing of Peenemünde in World War II was carried out on several occasions as part of the overall Operation Crossbow to disrupt German secret weapon development. The first raid on Peenemünde, on the Baltic coast of Germany, was Operation Hydra of the night of 17/18 August 1943, involving 596 heavy bombers of the Royal Air Force. Intelligence about the existence and location of the programme was said by some to have been obtained from the secretly recorded conversations of a German officer, Wilhelm Ritter von Thoma, who was a prisoner of war of the British. However, von Thoma is not mentioned in declassified files and the story may have been fabricated in order to protect members of the Belgian and Luxemburg resistance. The official history of MI6 by Prof Keith Jeffery cites several sources including a tip-off from forced labourers drafted to work at Peenemünde. Subsequent attacks were carried out in daylight raids by the US Army Air Force's Eighth Air Force. Among those on the ground at Peenemünde were Walter Dornberger, noted rocket expert Wernher von Braun, and Nazi female test pilot Hanna Reitsch, who later claimed to have slept through the raid. Some markers were dropped too far south, and ultimately a number of buildings remained undamaged, while many bombs hit the forced labour camps, killing between 500 and 600 prisoners. However, sufficient damage was caused to delay the V-weapons programme for some months, and the senior engineer Dr Walter Thiel was among the dead.

== Operations ==
Bombing of Peenemünde in World War II
Date	Target	Mission
18 August 1943	Operation; Hydra	324 Lancasters, 218 Halifaxes and 54 Stirlings attacked the Peenemünde Army Research Centre in Operation Hydra, the first attack of Operation Crossbow.
18 July 1944	Mission 481	377 Boeing B-17 Flying Fortresses bombed the Peenemünde experimental establishment, the scientific HQ at Zinnowitz and marshalling yards at Stralsund. Three B-17s were lost and 64 were damaged. Escort was provided by 297 P-38 Lightnings and P-51 Mustangs; they claimed 21-0-12 Luftwaffe aircraft; three P-51s were lost and one was damaged beyond repair. A Peenemünde test launch planned that day was scrapped when Test Stand VII was heavily damaged. The P-11 production calibration firing stand near Werke Süd was a complete loss and 50 people were killed, including anti-aircraft gunners.
4 August 1944	Mission 512	221 B-17s against Peenemünde, 110 against Anklam Airfield and 70 against Anklam aircraft factories; they claimed 1-0-0 Luftwaffe aircraft; three B-17s were lost, one was damaged beyond repair and 94 damaged; 2 airmen were KIA, 2 WIA and 40 MIA. Escort was provided by 223 P-51s; they claimed 4-0-4 Luftwaffe aircraft on the ground; 9 P-51s were lost and 1 was damaged beyond repair; 1 pilot was KIA. Ten people at Peenemünde were killed, including anti-aircraft gunners. The big hangar had been damaged, including the office and laboratory wings.
25 August 1944	Mission 570	376 B-17s against the Peenemünde Experimental Station (146), Neubrandenburg Airfield (108) and Anklam Airfield (73); 21 others hit Parow airfield and 5 hit targets of opportunity; 5 B-17s were lost and 75 damaged; 1 airman was KIA, 9 WIA and 45 MIA. Escort was provided by 171 P-47s and P-51s; they claimed 36-0-28 aircraft on the ground; 2 P-51s were lost. Repairs to Peenemünde Test Stand VII allowed launchings to resume six weeks later.

== References and notes ==
Notes

Bibliography

- Clare Mulley, The Women Who Flew for Hitler (Macmillan, 2017) ISBN 978-1447274230
