= Trassenheide =

- Municipality
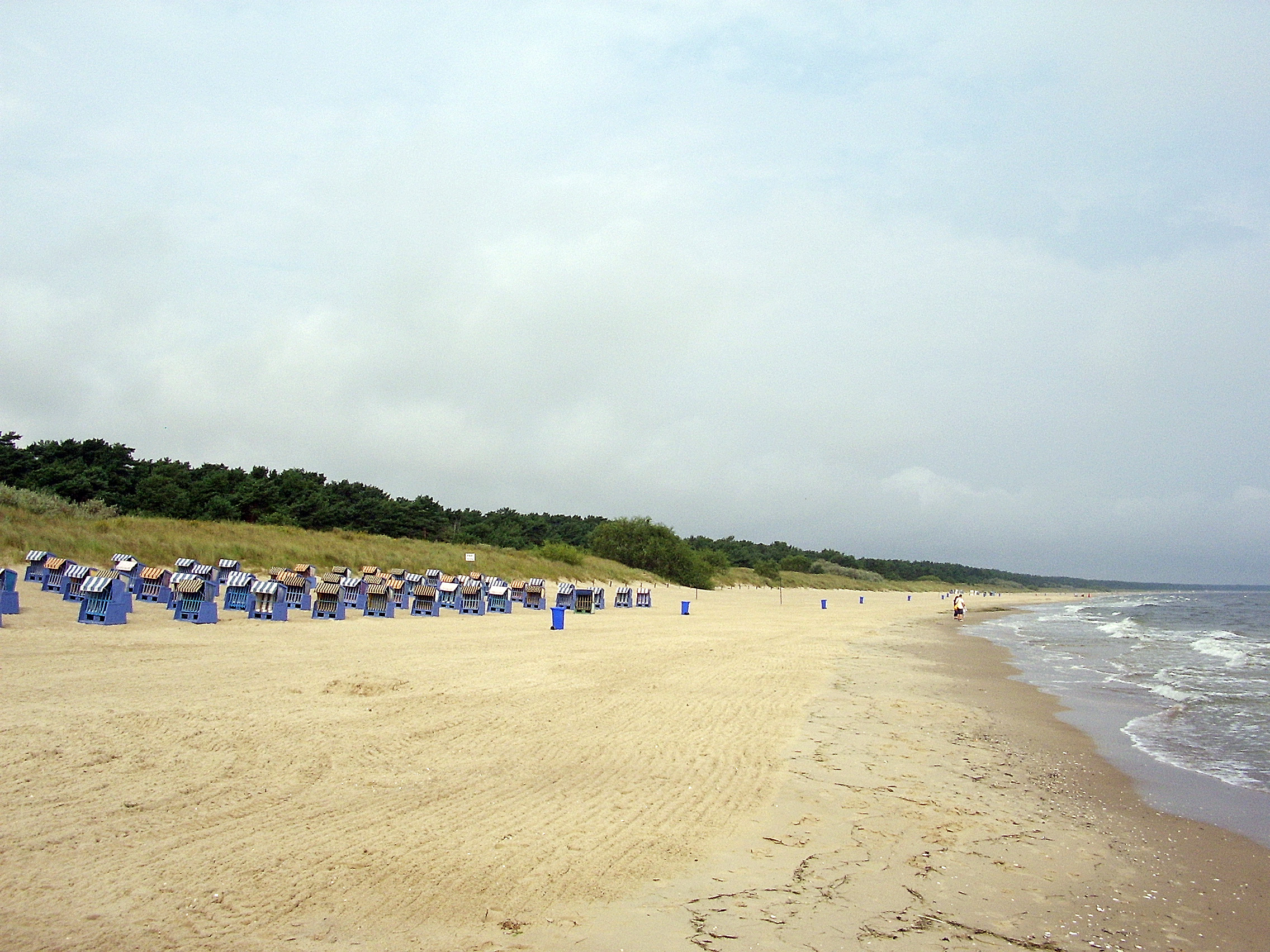

- Coat of arms

- Location of Trassenheide within Vorpommern-Greifswald district
- Interactive map of Trassenheide
- Location within Germany Location within Mecklenburg-Vorpommern
- Coordinates: 54°06′N 13°52′E
- Country: Germany
- State: Mecklenburg-Vorpommern
- District: Vorpommern-Greifswald
- Municipal assoc.: Usedom-Nord

Government
  - Mayor: Michael Dumke

Area
  - Total: 6.50 km^{2} (2.51 sq mi)
- Elevation: 0 m (0 ft)

Population (2025-12-31)
  - Total: 884
  - Density: 136/km^{2} (352/sq mi)
- Time zone: UTC+01:00 (CET)
  - Summer (DST): UTC+02:00 (CEST)
- Postal codes: 17449
- Dialling codes: 038371
- Vehicle registration: VG
- Website: www.seebad-trassenheide.de

Trassenheide is a seaside resort on the island of Usedom in the state of Mecklenburg-Vorpommern, in Germany. Trassenheide has approximately 1,000 inhabitants and the main source of income is tourism.

== History ==
The first documented mention of Trassenheide was in 1786, first under the designation "mutton stable"; a large sheep stable had been established to protect herds of sheep against sudden flooding by the Baltic Sea. By 1840 there were 138 inhabitants. In 1908 the colony was named "Trassenheide". At this time tourism began. In 1928 Trassenheide was made an independent municipality.

In August 1943 it was heavily damaged by a bomb attack aimed at the neighbouring Luftwaffe rocket research station in Peenemünde. Hundreds of enslaved people in the Trassenheide labour camp were killed in the bombing.

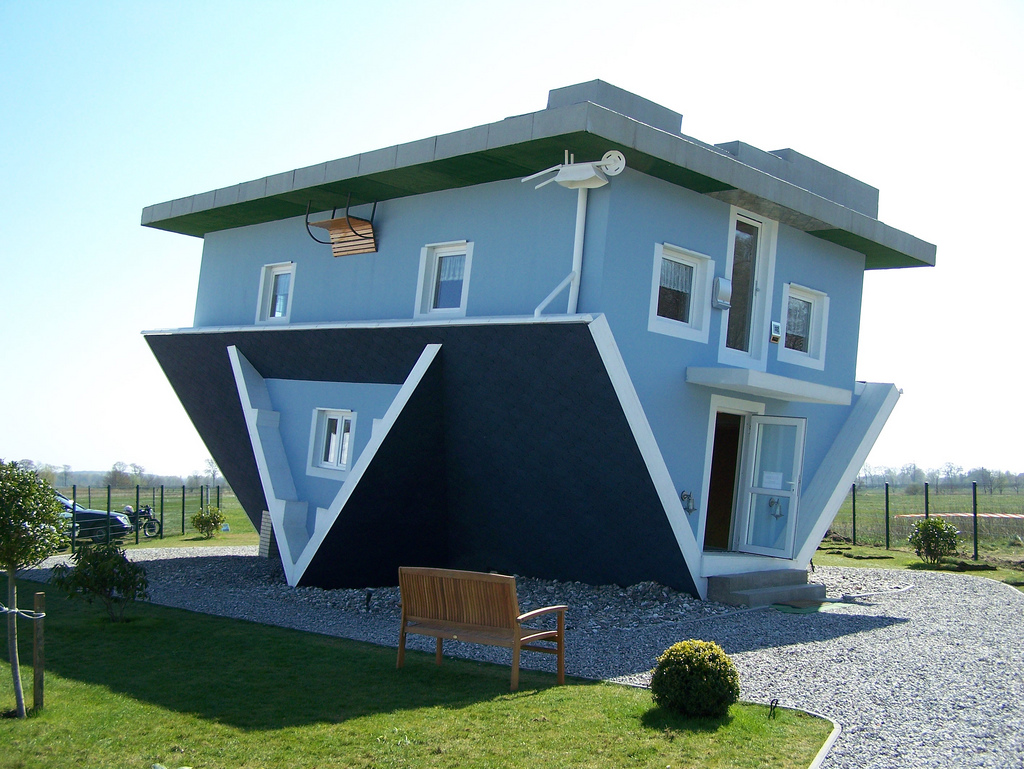
The Upside-Down House in Trassenheide

== Upside-Down House ==
On September 4, 2008, an upside-down house was built as a source of tourism. The architects, Polish partners Klaudiusz Golos and Sebastian Mikiciuk designed the house as part of the project 'The World Upside Down' that should allow visitors a different view of everyday items. Since the whole interior is upside-down and can disorient some, the house will be used purely as an exhibit.

The project was completed in August 2008.
