= Operation Crossbow Site =

- U.S. National Register of Historic Places
- Location within Florida Location within the United States
- Location: Eglin Air Force Base, Florida
- Coordinates: 30°36′10″N 86°18′04″W
- Area: 14 acres (5.7 ha)
- Built: 1944
- NRHP reference No.: 98001256
- Added to NRHP: October 22, 1998

The Operation Crossbow Site is a historic location at Eglin Air Force Base, Florida. During World War II, a reconstruction of a German V-1 flying bomb launch site was built to test the measures needed to destroy the actual bases in France.

In January 1944, General Grandison Gardner orders read, "Reproduction of the ski sites in complete detail and destruction in various ways." He determined low-level bombing with the heaviest bombs achieved the greatest accuracy.

On October 22, 1998, it was added to the United States National Register of Historic Places.

The Site was built in a hurry, "working around the clock for 13 days" in 1944 on a "remote part of the Eglin reservation".

== Current state ==
"Portions of nine concrete and brick structures" remain on the 14-acre site. Some buildings are "virtually intact and show little damage from the many attempts over the years to destroy them." A 2014 Historic American Engineering Record survey noted two existing clusters of buildings, left as they had been in 1944.

== See also ==
- V-1 flying bomb facilities
- Operation Crossbow
