= Operation Crossbow =

World War II Allied operations against German long-range weapons

World War II Operation Crossbow
- Part of Strategic bombing campaigns in Europe
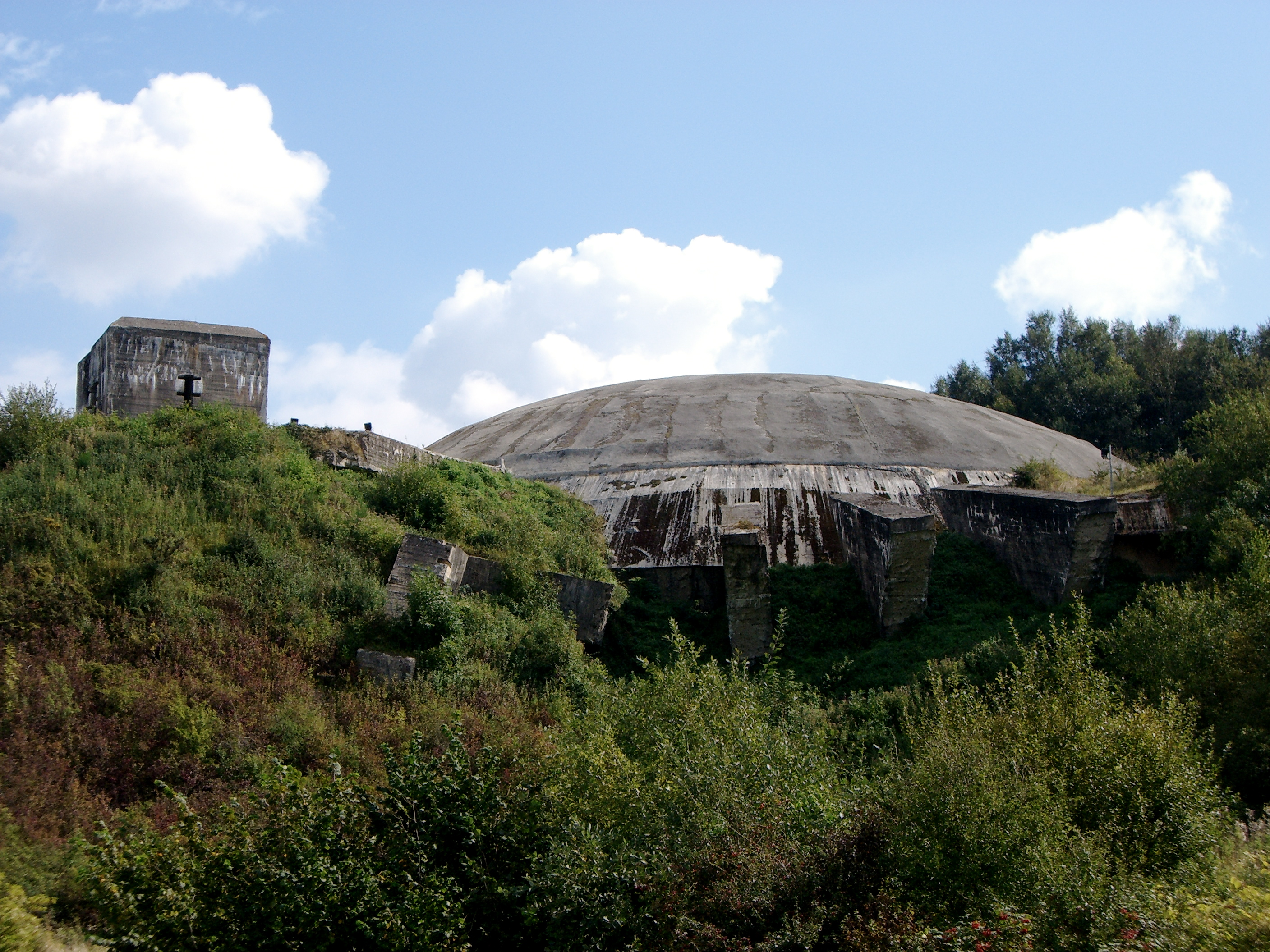
- The La Coupole V-2 launch site at Wizernes in France was destroyed by bombing before it could be brought into use
Date	August 1943 – 2 May 1945
Location	Germany, France, Belgium, Netherlands
Result	Delayed use of V-weapons but "limited effect" on production; major diversion of Allied resources

Belligerents
United Kingdom; United States; Canada	Germany

Strength
Sorties/bomb tonnage: Total: 68,913/122,133; RAF: 19,584/72,141 USAAF: 17,211/30,350	V-1 launches: 9,251 (8,000 targeting London, 2,448 targetting Antwerp) V-2 launches: 1,664; 1,402; 76; 19; 11 (Ludendorff Bridge)

Casualties and losses
Airmen/aircraft: more than 700 killed, at least 154 aircraft lost; British civilians killed/seriously injured: V-1: 6,184/17,981; V-2: 2,754/6,523; French civilians: 3,600 killed, about 10,000 wounded by Allied bombing	V-1: 4,261 destroyed by AA guns (1,878) barrage balloons (231) and fighters (1,846) (Note: Hawker Tempest: 638, de Havilland Mosquito: 428, Supermarine Spitfire: 303, North American P-51 Mustang: 232, and others: 158) V-2: 51/117 killed/wounded, 48/69 rockets/vehicles damaged

Crossbow was the code name in World War II for Anglo-American operations against the German long range reprisal weapons (V-weapons) programme. The primary V-weapons were the V-1 flying bomb and V-2 rocket, which were launched against Britain from 1944 to 1945 and used against continental European targets as well.

Initial intelligence investigations in 1943 into the progress of German long range weapons were carried out under the code name Bodyline. On 15 November, a larger operation was set up under the name Crossbow. Post-war, Crossbow operations became known as "Operation Crossbow" particularly following the 1965 film of the same name.

Crossbow included strategic operations against research and development of the weapons, their manufacture, transportation and attacks on their launch site, and fighter intercepts against missiles in flight. At one point, the British government, in near panic, demanded that upwards of 40% of bomber sorties be targeted against the launch sites.

The Crossbow attacks were not very successful, and every raid carried out against a V-1 or V-2 reduced the assets available for targets in the Third Reich. The diversion of Allied resources from other targets represented a major success for Hitler.

== Tactical bombing ==
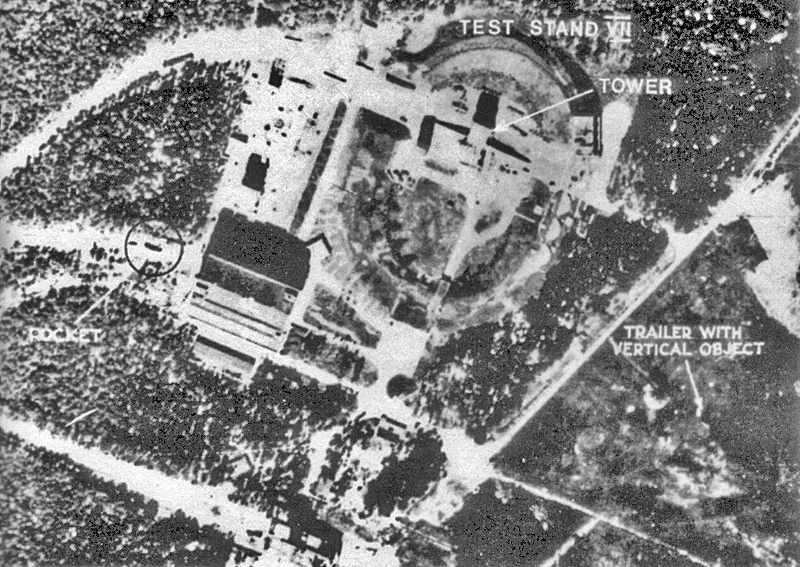
Peenemünde Test Stand VII

In May 1943 Allied surveillance observed the construction of the first of eleven large sites in northern France for secret German weapons, including six for the V-2 rocket. In November it discovered the first of 96 "ski sites" for the V-1 flying bomb.

Officials debated the extent of the German weapons' danger; some viewed the sites as decoys to divert Allied bombers, while others feared chemical or biological warheads. The Allies received detailed information about V-1, V-2 and Peenemünde research site from the Austrian resistance group around the priest Heinrich Maier. This also included the production sites such as the Raxwerke. When reconnaissance and intelligence information regarding the V-2 became convincing, the War Cabinet Defence Committee (Operations) directed the campaign's first planned (Note: The June 1943 Operation Bellicose was not targeted against German long-range weapons, but happened to be the first bombing of a German long-range weapon facility (the Zeppelin Werk). Likewise, an 22/23 October 1943, RAF city bombing wrecked homes of workers employed at the Gerhard Fieseler Werke, delaying both their transfer to the new V-1 plant at Rothwesten and, as a result, "the final trials of the [V-1] weapon's power unit, control-gear, diving mechanism, compass and air-log" until February (a "three or four" month delay of V-1s). Also, a few V-2 centre sections had been assembled by the Raxwerke when a 2 November 1943, Fifteenth Air Force mission targeting the nearby Messerschmitt fighter aircraft plant hit the Raxwerke.) raid (the Operation Hydra attack on Peenemünde in August 1943).

The works in France were the German "Site System 1" which was to be 96 fixed launching sites with storage bunkers (the 'ski' shapes) and outdoor ramps. Site System 2 (a reserve) and System 3 were planned. There were also four larger Wasserwerk ("Waterworks") bunker sites: Siracourt, Lottinghen, Couville, Tamerville, and Brécourt. Intended for use in January 1944 actual progress in construction, training and supply of V-1s was behind when inspected by German high command in October. French reports and detailed aerial reconnaissance linked with reconnaissance of Peenemünde indicated possibility of 2,000 missiles per day against England. Over half the sites were completed by December but Allied intelligence had identified all 96 by end of January. The first bombing of sites was by USAAF Martin B-26 Marauder medium bombers in early December with RAF Bomber Command starting night-time attacks shortly after but the greater inaccuracy of night bombing against small targets led the Joint Chiefs of Staff to use US heavy bombers in daylight. By the end of December, 54 sites had been attacked and 7 were destroyed. The bombing continued, and by end of March, 9 sites were destroyed and 35 seriously damaged. By May, 24 sites were destroyed and 58 seriously damaged.

Following Operation Hydra, a few Crossbow attacks were conducted on the "Heavy Crossbow" bunkers of Watten (V-2) and Mimoyecques (actually V-3 rocket cannon) from August and November 1943 respectively. "Crossbow Operations Against Ski Sites" began on 5 December with the "Noball" code name used for the targets (e.g., 'Noball 27' was the Ailly-le-Vieux-Clocher [sic] site, "Noball No. 93" was in the Cherbourg area, "Noball No. 107" was at Grand Parc, and "Noball V1 site No.147" was at Ligescourt).

The US formed its own Crossbow Committee under General Stephen Henry (New Developments Division) on 29 December 1943, and the US subsequently developed bombing techniques for ski sites in February/March 1944 at the Air Corps Proving Ground.

United States Army Air Force video on Operation Crossbow

A mid-1944 plan for US Marine Corps aircraft to attack V-1 launch sites from aircraft carriers fell victim to inter-service rivalry – being opposed by the Army. V-2 facilities were also bombed in 1944, including smaller facilities such as V-2 storage depots and liquid oxygen plants, such as the Mery-sur-Oise V-2 storage depot on 4 August 1944, and, by the Eighth Air Force, which bombed five cryogenic liquid oxygen plants in Belgium on 25 August 1944, but aborted the next days attack on plants "at La Louviere, Torte and Willebroeck, Belgium" due to cloud.

=== Priority ===
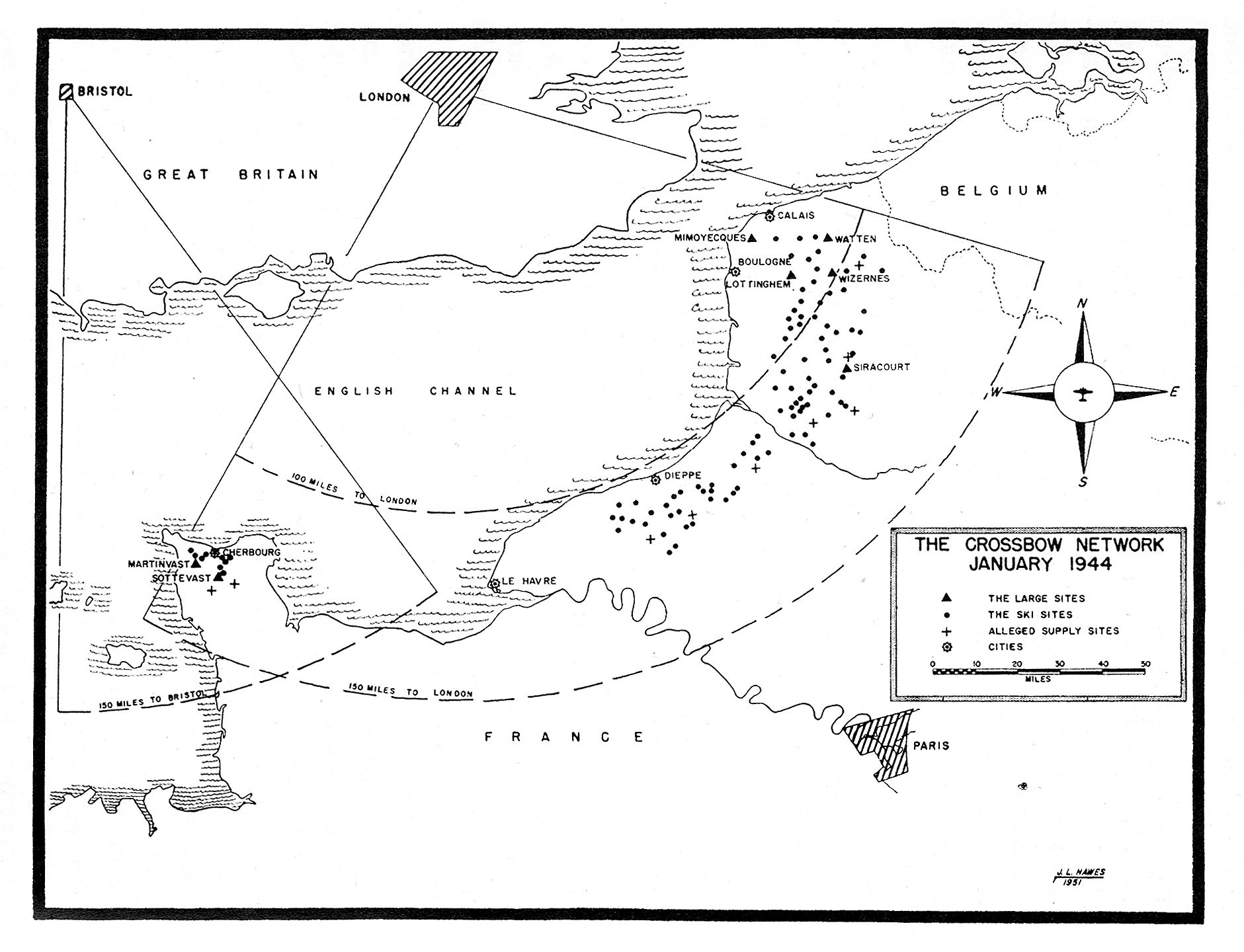
A World War II map shows the two areas where the Germans were setting up their secret "V" weapons to bombard England (right, center). These are the areas in which the Royal Air Force and 8th Air Force heavy bombers concentrated their bombs in order to knock out the weapons – part of the pre-invasion plan. This event was given the operational code name Crossbow during World War II.

At the request of the British War Cabinet, on 19 April 1944, General Eisenhower directed Crossbow attacks to have absolute priority over all other air operations, including "wearing down German industry" and civilian morale "for the time being", which he confirmed after the V-1 assault began on the night of 12/13 June 1944, saying to Arthur Tedder "with respect to Crossbow targets, these targets are to take first priority over everything except the urgent requirements of the Overlord [invasion of Normandy] battle; this priority to obtain until we can be certain that we have definitely gotten the upper hand of this particular business".

The launches surprised the Allies, who had believed that the earlier attacks on the sites had eliminated the danger. The British, who had not expected German bombing of Britain to resume so late in the war, were especially upset. Some suggested using gas on the launch sites, or even executing German civilians as punishment.

Carl Spaatz, commander of US Strategic Air Forces in Europe (USSTAF), responded on 28 June to "complain that Crossbow was a 'diversion' from the main task of wearing down the Luftwaffe and bombing German industry" for the Combined Bomber Offensive, and to recommend instead that Crossbow be a secondary priority since "days of bad weather over Germany's industrial targets would still allow enough weight of attack for the rocket sites and the lesser tactical crises". By 10 July, Tedder had published a list of Crossbow targets which assigned 30 to RAF Bomber Command, 6 to the tactical Allied Expeditionary Air Force, and 68 to Spaatz's USSTAF; after which Spaatz again complained, so Eisenhower allowed "spare" bombing of non-Crossbow targets: "Instructions for continuing to make Crossbow targets our first priority must stand, but ... when ... the entire strategic forces cannot be used against Crossbow, we should attack – (a) Aircraft industry, (b) Oil, (c) Ball bearing (German): kugellagerwerke, (d) Vehicular production" (Eisenhower, 18 July).

Over a quarter of the Combined Bomber Offensive's tonnage of bombs were used against V-weapon sites in July and August; many of the attacks were ineffective, as they were against unused sites rather than the launchers themselves. Spaatz unsuccessfully proposed that attacks concentrate on the Calais electrical grid, and on gyrocompass factories in Germany and V-weapon storage depots in France. The gyrocompass attacks, along with targeting liquid oxygen tanks (which the Allies knew the V-2 needed), might have been very effective against the missiles. On 25 August 1944, the Joint Crossbow Target Priorities Committee (established 21 July) prepared the "Plan for Attack on the German Rocket Organization When Rocket Attacks Commence" – in addition to bombing of storage, liquid-oxygen, and launch sites; the plan included aerial reconnaissance operations. Following the last V-1 launch from France on 1 September 1944, and since the expected V-2 attacks had not begun, Crossbow bombing was suspended on 3 September and the campaign against German oil facilities became the highest priority.

The V-1 threat from occupied France ended on 5 September 1944, when the 3rd Canadian Infantry Division contained the German military units of the Nord-Pas de Calais area, with their surrender following on 30 September.

=== Resumption ===
Crossbow bombing resumed after the first V-2 attack and included a large 17 September raid on Dutch targets suspected as bases for Heinkel He 111s, which were air-launching V-1s. Modified V-1s (865 total) were air-launched from 16 September 1944, to 14 January 1945. The British had initially considered that an earlier 18–21 July 1944 effort of 50 air-launched V-1s had been ground-launched from the Low Countries, particularly near Ostend. In addition to air-launched V-1s, launches were from ramps built in the province of South Holland, the Netherlands in 1945.

Allied reconnaissance detected two sites at Vlaardingen and Ypenburg, and along with a third at Delft, they launched 274 V-1s at London from 3–29 March. Only 125 reached the British defences, and only 13 of those reached the target area. Three additional sites directed their fire on Antwerp. After using medium bombers against V-2 launch site in the Haagse Bos on 3 March, the RAF attacked the V-1 sites in the Netherlands with two squadrons. An RAF Fighter Command unit used Spitfires against Ypenburg on 20 and 23 March, while a RAF Second Tactical Air Force unit used Hawker Typhoons against Vlaardingen on 23 March. Counterattacks on V-1 and V-2 sites in the Netherlands ended on 3 April, and all Crossbow countermeasures ended on 2 May with the end of World War II in Europe.

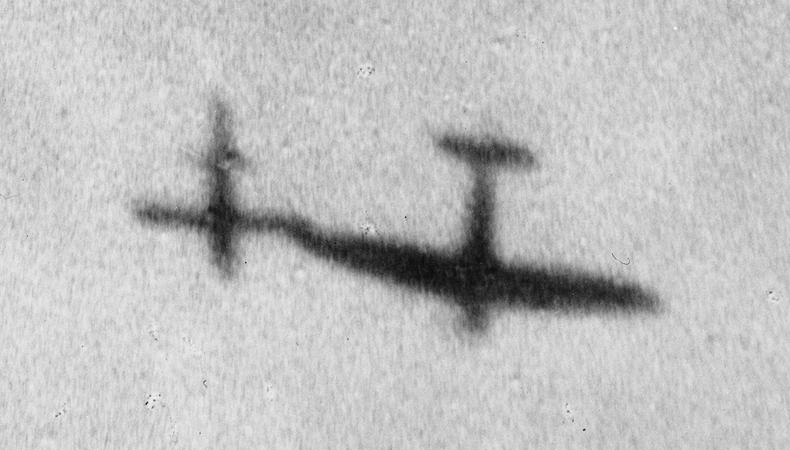
A Spitfire tipping the wing of a V-1 to disrupt the missile's automatic pilot.

== V-1 defence ==
On 2 January 1944, Air Marshal Roderic Hill, Air Officer Commander-in-Chief of Air Defence of Great Britain submitted his plan to deploy 1,332 guns for the defence of London, Bristol and the Solent against the V-1 "Robot Blitz" (the "Diver Operations Room" was located at RAF Biggin Hill). Against V-1s attacks there were belts of select units of Fighter Command (No. 150 Wing RAF) operating high-speed fighters, the anti-aircraft guns of Anti-Aircraft Command, and approximately 1,750 barrage balloons of Balloon Command around London.

"Flabby" was the code name for medium weather-conditions when fighters were allowed to chase flying bombs over the gun-belt to the balloon line, and during Operation Totter, the Royal Observer Corps fired "Snowflake" illuminating rocket flares from the ground to identify V-1 flying bombs to RAF fighters. After the Robot Blitz began on the night of 12/13 June 1944, the first RAF fighter interception of a V-1 was on 14/15 June. Moreover, anti-aircraft guns increased the rate of downed V-1s to 1 per 77 rounds fired after the introduction of proximity fuses. Despite the defences, by 27 June, "over 100,000 houses had been damaged or destroyed by the V-1 ... and shattered sewage systems threatened serious epidemics unless fixed by winter."

Of the 638 air-launched V-1s that had been observed, guns and fighters brought down 403; 66 fell in the London Civil Defence Region and 169 in other places, including Southampton on 7 July and one as far north as Manchester.

== V-2 counter-measures ==
The British intelligence services (Secret Intelligence Service and Air Ministry's Scientific Intelligence Office) were monitoring German rocket artillery research and information received by bugging high-ranking German prisoners-of-war increased focus on activities at Peenemunde. In response to discussions by the vice-chiefs of staff on the subject of German long range rocket developments, in April 1943 Duncan Sandys was given the responsibility of investigating how far Germany had progressed. Under the codename Bodyline, investigations by SIS, the Combined Services Detailed Interrogation Centre, and the Photographic Reconnaissance Unit were able to confirm existence of rocketry activities at Peenemunde and Sandys reported his findings to the chiefs of staff that the Germans were developing rockets, were probably well-advanced and countermeasures should be studied

The Bodyline Scientific Committee (19 members, including Duncan Sandys, Edward Victor Appleton, John Cockcroft, Robert Watson-Watt) was formed in September 1943 regarding the suspected V-2 rocket. After the 1944 crash of a test V-2 in Sweden, "transmitters to jam the guidance system of the rocket" were prepared. A British sound-ranging system provided "trajectory [data] from which the general launching area could be determined", and the microphone(s) in East Kent reported the times of the first V-2 strikes on 8 September 1944: 18:40:52 and 18:41:08.

In November 1943, the Bodyline committee handed over the tasks to the Air Ministry as the extent of the issue became clear.

On 21 March 1945, the Pile's plan for the "Engagement of Long Range Rockets with AA Gunfire" which called for anti-aircraft units to fire into a radar-predicted airspace to intercept the V-2 was ready, but the plan was not used due to the danger of shells falling on Greater London.

Unlike the V-1, which had a speed similar to the fastest available fighter planes, the velocity and trajectory of a V-2 made aircraft interception an impossibility. Happenstance instances of Allied aircraft encountering launched V-2 rockets include: 29 October 1944, Lieutenants Donald A. Schultz and Charles M. Crane in a Lockheed P-38 Lightning attempted to photograph a launched V-2 above the trees near the River Rhine, 1 January 1945, a 4th Fighter Group pilot aloft over the northern flightpath for attacking elements of five German fighter wings on Unternehmen Bodenplatte that day, observed a V-2 "act up for firing near Lochem ... the rocket was immediately tilted from 85 deg. to 30 deg", and on 14 February 1945, a No. 602 Squadron RAF Spitfire Mk XVI pilot, Raymond Baxter's colleague "Cupid" Love, fired at a V-2 just after launch.

After the last combat V-2 launch on 27 March 1945, the British discontinued their use of radar in the defence region to detect V-2 launches on 13 April.

== Named activities ==
- Bodyline Joint Staff Committee
- Diver – a secret British Defence Instruction specified the code name: "Enemy Flying Bombs will be referred to or known as 'Diver' aircraft or pilotless planes" to alert defences of an imminent attack (often called Operation Diver, particularly post-war, without citation).
- Flying Bomb Counter Measures Committee (Duncan Sandys, chairman)
- Fuel Panel of the Special Scientific Committee (Sir Frank Smith, chairman)
- Questionnaire ... to establish the practicability ... of the German Long-Range Rocket (by Frederick Lindemann, 1st Viscount Cherwell)
- Project Danny, a plan to use Marine F4U Corsairs of Marine Air Group 51 to strike V-1 sites with Tiny Tim rockets. The operation was ultimately scrapped under the orders of General Marshall as a result of the intense inter-service rivalry that existed at the time.

== See also ==
- Aviation in World War II
- List of air operations during the Battle of Europe
- Strategic bombing during World War II
- Operation Hydra (1943)

== Bibliography ==
- Collier, Basil (1976) [1964]. The Battle of the V-Weapons, 1944–1945. Yorkshire: The Emfield Press. ISBN 0-7057-0070-4.
- Cooksley, Peter G (1979). Flying Bomb. New York: Charles Scribner's Sons. ISBN 0-684-16284-9.
- Craven, Wesley Frank; Cate, James Lea, eds. (1951). Volume 3. Europe: Argument to V-E Day, January 1944 to May 1945. The Army Air Forces in World War II. ISBN 978-0-912799-03-2 – via Hyperwar Foundation.
- Eisenhower, David (1991) [1986]. Eisenhower: At War 1943–1945. New York: Wings Books. ISBN 0-517-06501-0.
- Gruen, Adam L (1998). "The U.S. Army Air Forces in World War II". Preemptive Defense, Allied Air Power Versus Hitler's V-Weapons, 1943–1945. Air Force History and Museums Program. pp. 4 (Round 1), 5 (Round 2). ISBN 978-0-16-049671-4. Archived from the original on 5 July 2009.
- Kelly, Jon (13 May 2011). "Operation Crossbow: How 3D glasses helped defeat Hitler". BBC.
- Kennedy, Gregory P. (1983). Vengeance Weapon 2: The V-2 Guided Missile. Washington DC: Smithsonian Institution Press. p. 4. ISBN 0-87474-573-X.
- Ordway, Frederick I III; Sharpe, Mitchell R (1979). The Rocket Team. Apogee Books Space Series 36. New York: Thomas Y. Crowell. ISBN 1-894959-00-0.
- Williams, Allan (2013). Operation Crossbow: The Untold Story of Photographic Intelligence and the Search For Hitler's V Weapons. Random House. ISBN 978-1848093072
- Zaloga, Steven J. (2018). Operation Crossbow 1944: Hunting Hitler's V-weapons. Oxford: Osprey Publishing. ISBN 978-1-4728-2614-5.
- Zaloga, Steven J. (2005). V-1 Flying Bomb 1942–1952. New Vanguard 106. Oxford: Osprey Publishing.
- "Campaign Diary 1940: Royal Air Force Bomber Command 60th Anniversary". UK Crown.
