= Ligescourt =

- Commune
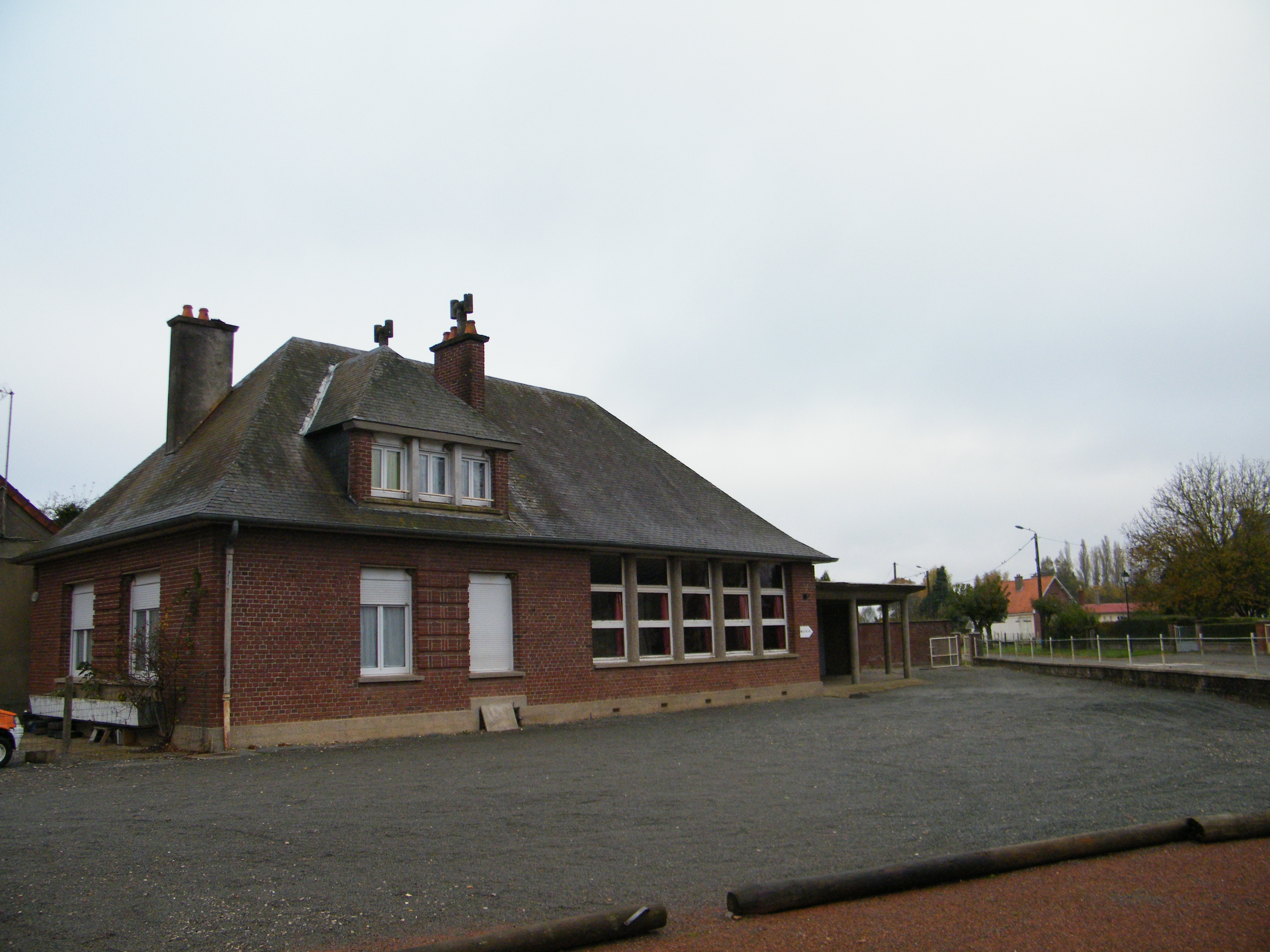
- The town hall and school in Ligescourt
- Location of Ligescourt
- Location within France Location within Hauts-de-France
- Coordinates: 50°17′23″N 1°52′36″E
- Country: France
- Region: Hauts-de-France
- Department: Somme
- Arrondissement: Abbeville
- Canton: Rue
- Intercommunality: Ponthieu-Marquenterre

Government
  - Mayor (2020–2026): Pascal Bourlo
- Area^{1}: 5.12 km^{2} (1.98 sq mi)
- Elevation: 78 m (256 ft)
- Highest elevation: 74 m (243 ft)
- Lowest elevation: 42 m (138 ft)
- Population (2023): 223
  - Density: 43.6/km^{2} (113/sq mi)
- Time zone: UTC+01:00 (CET)
  - Summer (DST): UTC+02:00 (CEST)
- INSEE/Postal code: 80477 /80150
- ^{1} French Land Register data, which excludes lakes, ponds, glaciers > 1 km^{2} (0.386 sq mi or 247 acres) and river estuaries.

Ligescourt is a commune in the Somme department in Hauts-de-France in northern France.

== Geography ==
Ligescourt is situated on the D12 road, some 14 miles (23 km) north of Abbeville.

== Population ==
Historical population
Year	Pop.	±% p.a.
1968	275	—
1975	245	−1.64%
1982	197	−3.07%
1990	206	+0.56%
1999	194	−0.66%
2007	226	+1.93%
2012	231	+0.44%
2017	219	−1.06%
2023	223	+0.30%
Source: INSEE

== See also ==
- Communes of the Somme department
