= Operation Hydra (1943) =

Royal Air Force bombing operation during World War II

- Part of Operation Crossbow
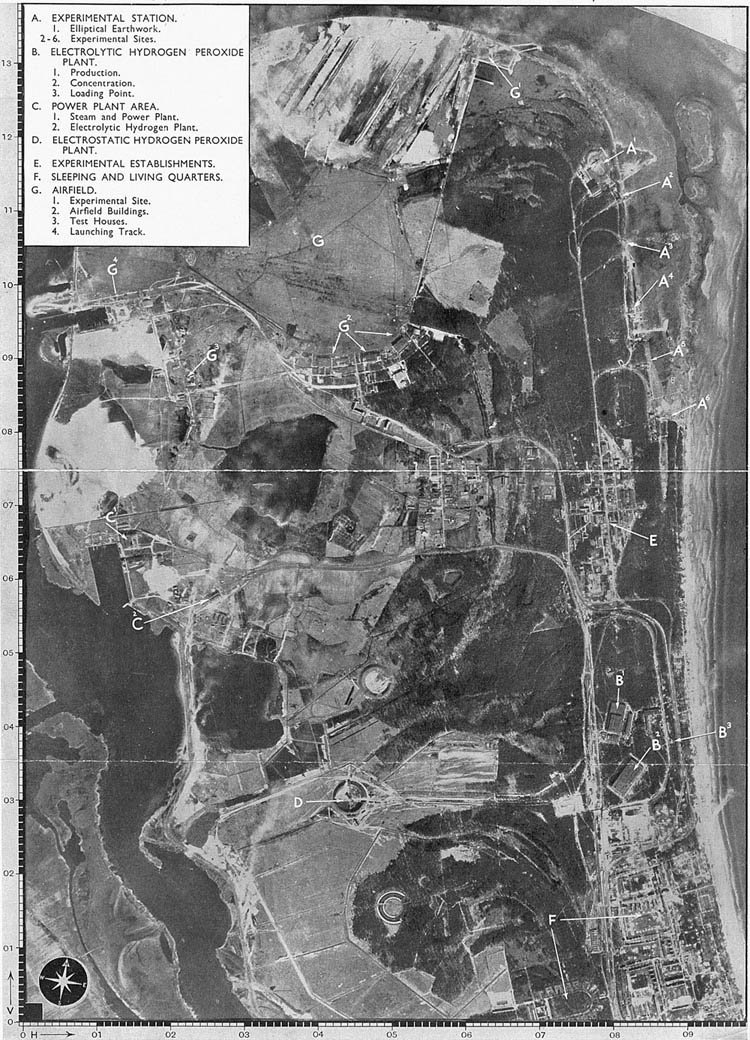
- British plan for the Peenemünde raid
Date	17/18 August 1943
Location	Peenemünde Research Center, Usedom 54.13°N 13.82°W
Result	British victory

Belligerents
RAF Bomber Command RAF Fighter Command	Luftwaffe

Commanders and leaders
John Searby (Master Bomber)	Josef Kammhuber; Hubert Weise

Strength
Hydra: 596 aircraft dispatched, 560 bombed 324 Avro Lancaster, 218 Handley Page Halifax, 54 Short Stirling; 1,924 long tons (1,955 t) bombs (1,795 long tons (1,824 t) dropped), 85 per cent HE; Whitebait: 8 Mosquitos; Intruders: 28 Mosquitos, 10 Beaufighters	Hydra: 35 night fighters inc. 2 Bf 109 c. 30 Focke-Wulf Fw 190

Casualties and losses
290: 245 killed, 45 POW; Hydra: 23 Lancasters, 15 Halifaxes, 2 Stirlings	12 aircrew killed, 12 aircraft lost: 8 Bf 110, 1 Do 217, 2 Fw 190, 1 Bf 109 c. 180 Germans, 500–732 slave workers 3 men and 1 convict labourer (by a bomb on Berlin)

Operation Hydra was an attack by RAF Bomber Command on a German scientific research centre at Peenemünde on the night of 17/18 August 1943. Group Captain John Searby, commanding officer of No. 83 Squadron RAF, commanded the operation, the first time that Bomber Command used a master bomber to direct the attack of the main force.

Hydra was the first operation against the German V-weapon programme, a campaign later known as "Crossbow". The British lost 40 bombers and 215 aircrew, and several hundred enslaved workers in the nearby Trassenheide forced labour camp were killed. The Luftwaffe lost 12 night-fighters and about 170 German civilian personnel were killed, including two V-2 rocket scientists.

Assessments of the raids effectiveness vary; the United States Strategic Bombing Survey (1945) called the raid "not effective", while in 2006 the historian Adam Tooze judged that it had been highly successful.

== Background ==
=== German rocket research ===
To evade the restrictions of the Treaty of Versailles (1919) the Reichswehr (the post-war German armed forces from 1919 to 1935) studied the possibility of using rockets to compensate for the limited amount of heavy artillery allowed by the treaty. The head of the ballistics and Munitions Section, Colonel Becker suggested that short-range anti-aircraft rockets be designed and accurate, longer-range missiles should be produced to carry gas or high explosives. In 1931, Captain Walter Dornberger joined the Ordnance Department to research rocket development. Dornberger led a group of researchers through the infancy of the new technology and secured funds at the expense of other fields of research. Other scientists studied the use of rockets for maritime rescue, weather data collection, postal services across the Alps and the Atlantic and a journey to the Moon.

=== OSS ===
The US Office of Strategic Services (OSS) received important information about the V-2 rockets and Peenemünde from the Austrian resistance group around the priest Heinrich Maier. The group, later uncovered by the Gestapo, had extensive contacts with the military, researchers, scientists and leading representatives of the German economy and in 1943 came into contact with Allen Dulles, the head of the OSS in Switzerland.

=== MI6 ===
Information had reached the British Secret Intelligence Service (SIS) about German weapons development since the Oslo report of November 1939, from Royal Air Force (RAF) photo-reconnaissance photographs taken from 22 April 1943 and eavesdropping on Lieutenant-General Wilhelm Ritter von Thoma, a prisoner-of-war in Britain, who expressed surprise that there had been no rocket bombardment of Britain. Other prisoners of war gave various and sometimes fanciful accounts. Information also came from Polish intelligence, a Danish chemical engineer and from Leon-Henri Roth and Dr Schwagen, Luxembourgish enrolés de force (forced labourers), who had worked at Peenemünde and smuggled out letters describing rocket research, giving conflicting accounts of the size, warhead range and means of propulsion of the device.

Despite the confusion, there was little doubt that the Germans were working on a rocket and in April 1943, the Chiefs of Staff warned operational HQs of the possibility of rocket weapons. Duncan Sandys was appointed by Winston Churchill to lead an inquiry to study the information and report on counter-measures.

At a meeting, Sandys introduced the aerial photographs of Peenemünde. Professor Frederick Lindemann, scientific advisor to Churchill, judged the information to be a hoax but R. V. Jones refuted Lindemann. The committee recommended stopping reconnaissance flights to Peenemünde, to avoid alerting the Germans. Churchill said that despite the problems with attempting an attack beyond the range of British navigation aids "we must attack it on the heaviest possible scale"

At 10 Downing Street on 15 July, the Chiefs of Staff, Herbert Morrison, Lindemann and Churchill examined the bombing plan and ordered an attack as soon as the moon and weather permitted.

== Prelude ==
=== Plan ===
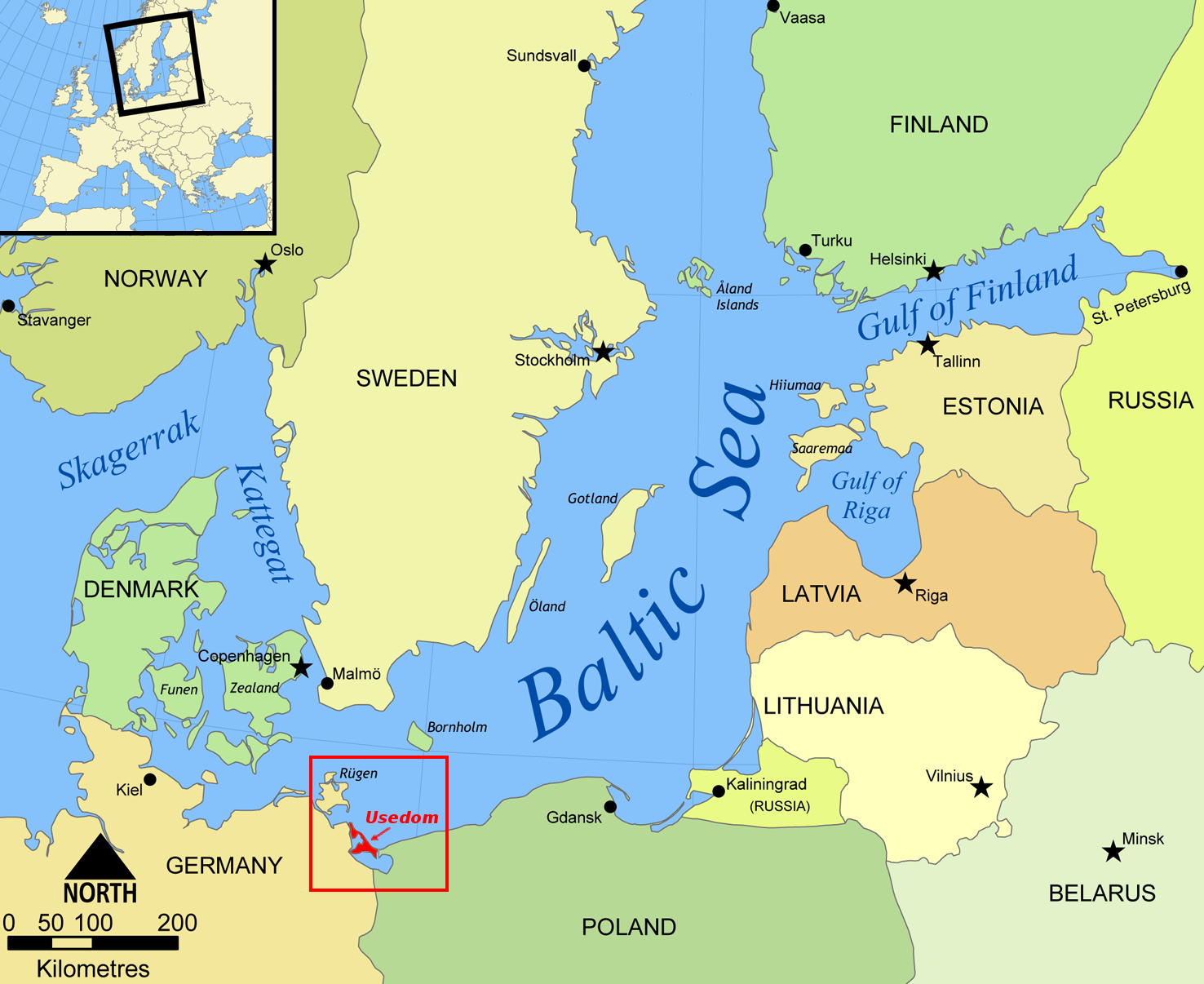
Map of Usedom, showing Rügen to the north

For accuracy, the raid was to take place during a full moon and the bombers would have to fly at 8,000 ft (2,400 m) instead of the normal altitude of 19,000 ft (5,800 m). Peenemünde was around 600 mi (1,000 km) from the closest British airbase, spread over a wide area and protected by smoke screens. All of Bomber Command was to fly on the raid and practice raids on areas similar to Peenemünde were made; margins of error of up to 1,000 yd (910 m) were initially recorded — by the last this was down to 300 yd (270 m). The primary objective was to kill as many personnel involved in the research and development of the V-weapons as possible, by bombing the workers' quarters. Secondary objectives were to render the research facility useless and "destroy as much of the V-weapons, related work, and documentation as possible".

The aircraft from 5 Group had practised a time and distance method for bombing; a distinctive point on the surface was used as a datum for the release of the bombs at a set time – and therefore distance – from it. H2S radar worked best over contrasting areas of ground and open water and 5 Group was to fly an approach run from Cape Arkona on the island of Rügen, to Thiessow to check time and heading. From Thiessow to the islet of Rüden any adjustments were to be made, followed by a timed run to Peenemünde on Usedom. The nature of the raid was not revealed to the aircrews; in their briefing, the target was referred to as developing radar that "promises to improve greatly the German night air defence organization". To scare aircrews into making a maximum effort, Order 176 emphasised the importance of the raid: "If the attack fails...it will be repeated the next night and on ensuing nights regardless, within practicable limits, of casualties.

=== Supporting operations ===
==== Whitebait (Berlin) ====
To divert German night fighters from Operation Hydra, eight Pathfinder Force (No. 8 Group RAF) Mosquitoes of 139 (Jamaica) Squadron flew to Whitebait (the codename for Berlin) to simulate the opening of a Main Force raid. By imitating the typical pathfinder marking of the target, it was expected that German night fighters would be lured to Berlin. At 22:56 British Double Summer Time (scheduled for 23:00), the first Mosquito was over Whitebait. Each Mosquito was to drop eight marker flares and a minimum bomb load.

==== Intruder operations ====
Fighter Command provided 28 Mosquito and 10 Beaufighter intruders from 25, 141, 410, 418 and 605 squadrons in two waves, to attack Luftwaffe airfields at Ardorf, Stade, Jagel, Westerland and Grove, to catch night fighters taking-off and landing. Eight Handley Page Halifaxes exploited the full moon to fly supply sorties to Europe, some to the Danish resistance movement, covered by the flight of the Main Force. Five Typhoons, two Hurricanes, a Mustang and a Whirlwind were to operate just across the English Channel.

== Attack ==
=== First wave ===
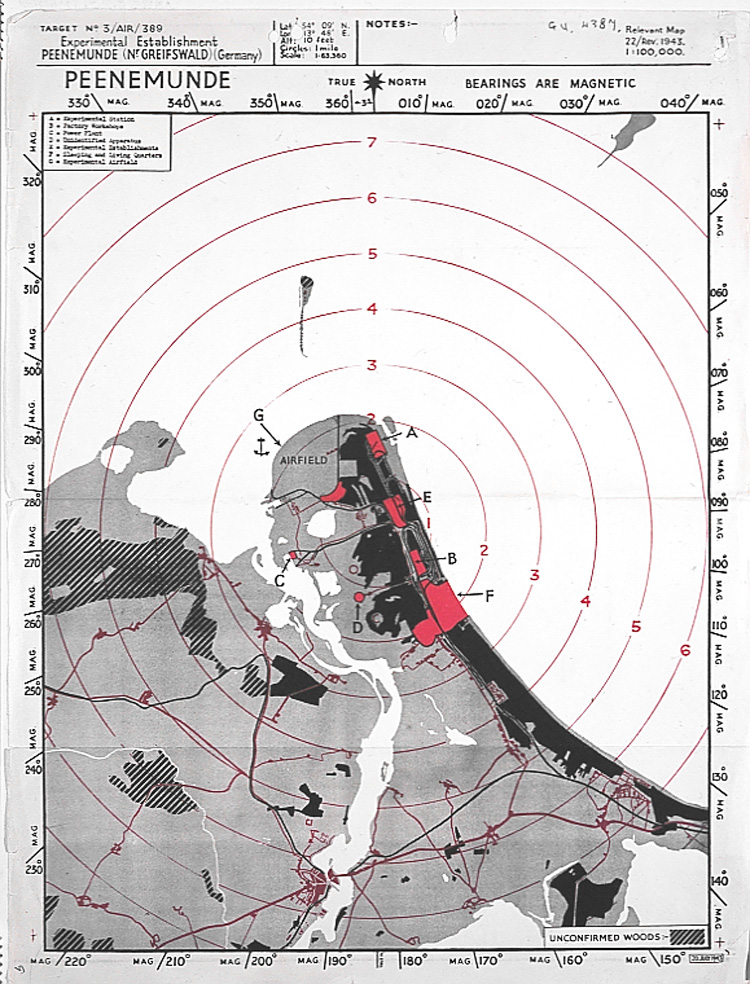
Target 3/Air/389, Attack order with targets highlighted

Throughout the attack, the master bomber (Group Captain J. H. Searby, CO of No. 83 Squadron RAF) circled over the target to call in new pathfinder markers and to direct crews as to which markers to bomb. The 244 3 Group and 4 Group Stirlings and Halifaxes attacked the V-2 scientists. At 00:10 British time, the first red spot fire was started and at 00:11, sixteen blind illuminator marker aircraft commenced marking runs with white parachute flares and long-burning red target indicators (TIs). Patches of stratocumulus cloud caused uncertain visibility in the full moon and Rügen did not show as distinctly on H2S radar as expected, with the result that the red "datum light" spot fires were placed on the northern tip of Peenemünde Hook instead of burning as planned for ten minutes on the northern edge of Rügen.

The 2 mi (3.2 km) error caused early yellow TIs to be dropped at the Trassenheide forced labour camp. Within three minutes, the master bomber noticed a yellow marker for the scientists' settlement "very well placed" and ordered more yellows as close as possible; four of six were accurate, as well as three backer-up green indicators. At 00:27, the first wave turned for home after encountering some flak, including a few heavy anti-aircraft guns on a ship 1 mi (1.6 km) offshore and guns on the western side of the peninsula. One third of the aircraft in the wave bombed Trassenheide and killed at least 500 enslaved workers before the accurate markers on the housing estate drew the bombing onto the target. About 75 per cent of the buildings were destroyed, but only about 170 of the 4,000 people attacked were killed because the soft ground muffled bomb explosions and air raid shelters in the estate, which had been well built. Dr Walter Thiel, the chief engineer of rocket motors and Dr Erich Walther, chief engineer of the rocket factory, were killed.

=== Second wave ===
The attack by 131 1 Group aircraft, 113 Lancasters, 6 Pathfinder Shifters and 12 Pathfinder Backers-Up began at 00:31 to destroy the V-2 works, in two buildings about 300 yd (270 m) long. The bombers carried a minimum of ninety 4,000 lb (1,800 kg), and just under seven hundred 1,000 lb (450 kg) bombs. The pathfinders had to move the marking from the first wave targets to the new ones, which had never been tried before. Each of the six pathfinder squadrons provided one aircraft as a shifter, which were to fly at 12,000 ft (3,700 m) with their bomb-sights set for 5,000 ft (1,500 m), which would make the markers land a mile short of the aiming point.

Just before the first wave finished bombing, the Pathfinder shifters would aim their red target indicators at the green indicators dropped by the first wave backers-up, ensuring that their red markers would land on the new aiming point, a mile short of the previous one. The green markers had been laid accurately but one Pathfinder shifter dropped 0.75 mi (1.21 km) short and three overshot by the same distance. The last shifter marked accurately and Searby warned the second wave to ignore the misplaced markers. The bombing hit a building used to store rockets, destroying the roof and the contents. During the attack, a high wind blew target markers eastwards, leading to some aircraft bombing the sea.

=== Third wave ===
The third wave was made up of 117 Lancasters of 5 Group and 52 Halifax and 9 Lancaster bombers of 6 Group, which attacked the experimental works, an area containing about 70 small buildings in which the scientific equipment and data were stored, along with the homes of Dornberger and his deputy Wernher von Braun. The wave arrived thirty minutes after the beginning of the attack; the crews found smoke from the bombing and the German smoke screen covered the target, clouds were forming and night-fighters decoyed to Berlin had arrived. The Canadian crews of 6 Group bombed the Pathfinder markers, some of which had drifted east or south and the 5 Group crews made time-and-distance runs, using Rügen as the datum to discover the wind and then flying at a speed which covered the 4 mi (6.4 km) to the target in slightly more than 60 seconds. The crews had been ordered to bomb on markers unless it was obvious that they were in the wrong place or were given directions by the master bomber.

The bombers flew 20 or even 30 seconds past the timing point to the visible and inaccurate green markers from the six "shifters" and three backers-up, their bombs landing 2,000–3,000 yd (1.1–1.7 mi; 1.8–2.7 km) beyond the development works in the concentration camp. At 00:55, due to timing errors, 35 stragglers were still waiting to bomb. The wind tunnel and telemetry block were missed but one third of the buildings were hit, including the HQ and the design block. German night-fighters shot down 28 bombers in about fifteen minutes, some by aircraft carrying the new upward-firing Schräge Musik. The bombers shot down five of the German fighters.

=== Luftwaffe ===
The Luftwaffe dispatched 213 night fighters once the British bombers made landfall over Denmark, 158 conventional twin-engined aircraft and 55 single-engined Wilde Sau (Wild Boar) Bf 109 and Fw 190 fighters.

== Aftermath ==
=== Analysis ===
Assessments of the raid's effectiveness vary; in 1943, Joseph Goebbels wrote of a delay of six to eight weeks, while the United States Strategic Bombing Survey (which, however, was prevented from visiting Soviet-occupied Peenemünde,) in 1945 called the raid "not effective". Walter Thiel and Erich Walther were killed when they were buried in one of the [air-raid] trenches, but the wind tunnel and telemetry block were untouched. Also, the Germans had already started to disperse the manufacturing of the V-2 in 1942, for example to Raderach near Friedrichshafen on Lake Constance. The United States Strategic Bombing Survey, which was published by the US War Department on 30 September 1945, found that RAF airstrike operations which took place "prior to the autumn of 1944", such as Operation Hydra, "did not substantially affect the course of German war production" and that "German war production as a whole continued to increase".

In volume II of The Strategic Air Offensive against Germany (1961) part of the official British History of the Second World War, Webster and Frankland wrote that Dornberger thought that the bombing delayed the A4 (V-2) project by four to six weeks, which had been followed by many later accounts but that this was anecdotal. The official historians wrote that the transfer of production to the Harz mountains and testing to Poland must have caused some delay in remedying the numerous design failings of the device and that the killing of Thiel and Walther might have made things worse. The attack on Peenemünde and other sites might have delayed the V-2 offensive by two months. Although research and development continued almost immediately and test launches resumed on 6 October, plans for some German V-2 facilities were changed after Hydra; the unfinished production plant for V-2s was moved to the Mittelwerk.

In 2006, Adam Tooze called the bombing highly successful and that the transfer of the production of 12,000 A4 missiles to Thuringia was a Herculean task.

=== Casualties ===
In the 2006 edition of his book, Martin Middlebrook wrote that 23 of the 45 huts at the Trassenheide labour camp were destroyed and that at least 500 and possibly 600 slave workers were killed in the bombing. According to Dornberger in Trent Park recorded confirmation 720 workers were killed in the operation.

Bomber Command suffered the loss of 6.7 percent of the aircraft dispatched, most of these in the third wave. After the Luftwaffe realised that the attack on Berlin was a diversion, about 30 Focke-Wulf Fw 190 Wilde Sau (wild boar) night fighters flew to the Baltic coast and shot down 29 of the 40 bombers lost; Leutnant Peter Erhardt, a Staffelkapitän and Unteroffizier Walter Höker flew the first operational Schräge Musik sorties in two Bf 110s. Fifteen British and Canadian airmen who were killed on the raid were buried by the Germans in unmarked graves within the secure perimeter. Their recovery at the end of the war was prevented by the Soviet authorities, and the bodies remain there to this day.

On 18 August, after the success of the diversion on Whitebait, the Luftwaffe chief of staff, General Hans Jeschonnek, shot and killed himself.

=== Camouflage ===
After Operation Hydra, the Germans fabricated signs of bomb damage on Peenemünde by creating craters in the sand (particularly near the wind tunnel), blowing-up lightly damaged and minor buildings and according to Peenemünde scientist Siegfried Winter, "We … climbed on to the roofs … and painted black and white lines to simulate charred beams." Operation Hydra also included the use of bombs with timers set for up to three days, so along with bombs that had not detonated (because of the sandy soil), explosions well after the attack occurred and hampered German salvage efforts.

== See also ==
- Ludwig Crüwell
- Wilhelm Ritter von Thoma
- Operation Crossbow
