= Peenemünde =

- Municipality
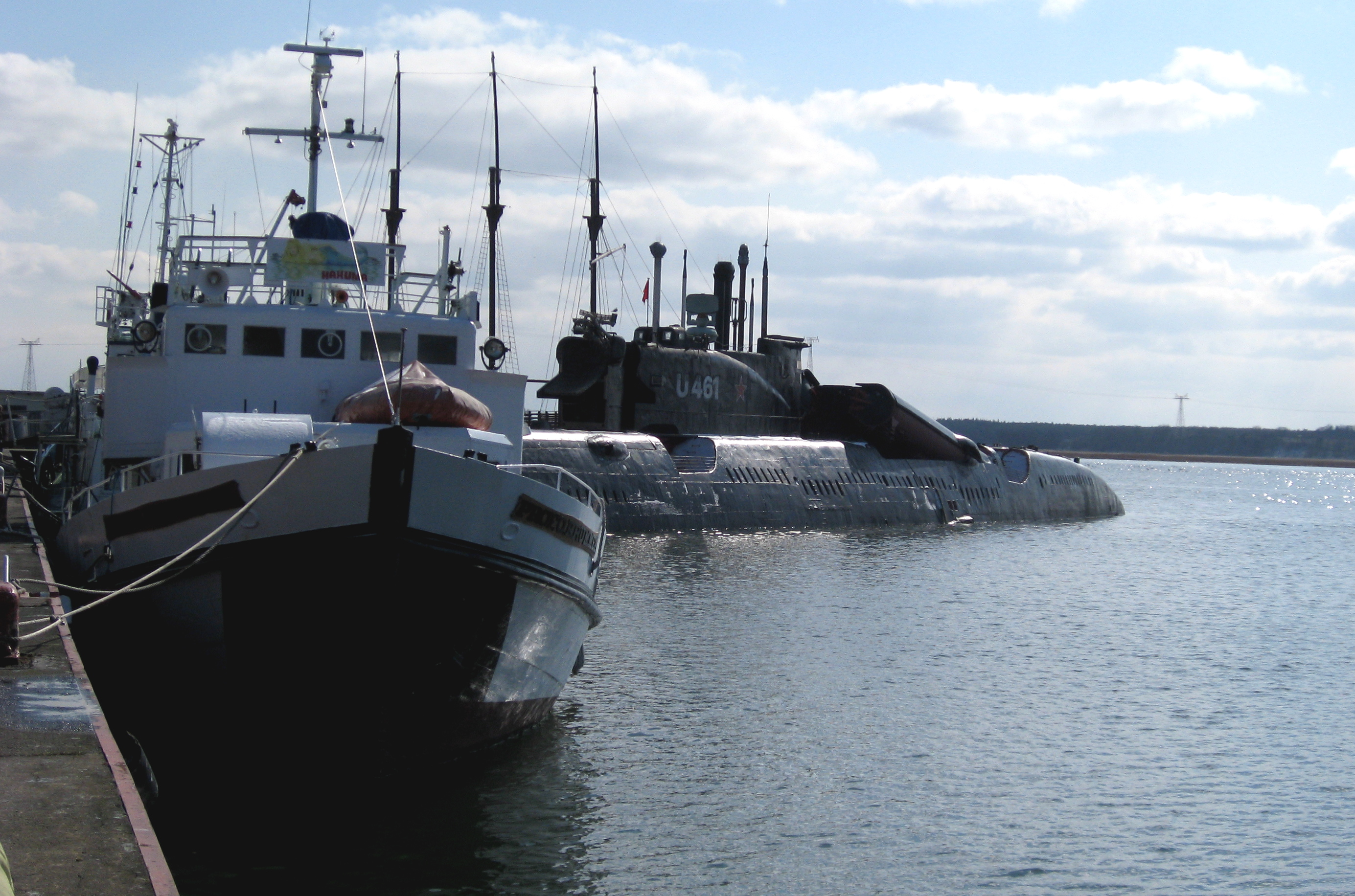
- Seaport

- Coat of arms

- Location of Peenemünde within Vorpommern-Greifswald district
- Interactive map of Peenemünde
- Location within Germany Location within Mecklenburg-Vorpommern
- Coordinates: 54°08′N 13°46′E
- Country: Germany
- State: Mecklenburg-Vorpommern
- District: Vorpommern-Greifswald
- Municipal assoc.: Usedom-Nord

Government
  - Mayor: Rainer Barthelmes

Area
  - Total: 25.74 km^{2} (9.94 sq mi)
- Elevation: 3.0 m (9.8 ft)

Population (2025-12-31)
  - Total: 430
  - Density: 17/km^{2} (43/sq mi)
- Time zone: UTC+01:00 (CET)
  - Summer (DST): UTC+02:00 (CEST)
- Postal codes: 17449
- Dialling codes: 038371
- Vehicle registration: VG
- Website: www.amtusedomnord.de

Peenemünde (German pronunciation: [peːnəˈmʏndə], lit. 'Peene [River] Mouth') is a municipality on the Baltic Sea island of Usedom in the Vorpommern-Greifswald district in Mecklenburg-Vorpommern in north-eastern Germany. It is part of the Amt (collective municipality) of Usedom-Nord. The community is known for the Peenemünde Army Research Center, where the world's first functional large-scale liquid-propellant rocket, the V-2, was developed.

== Geography ==
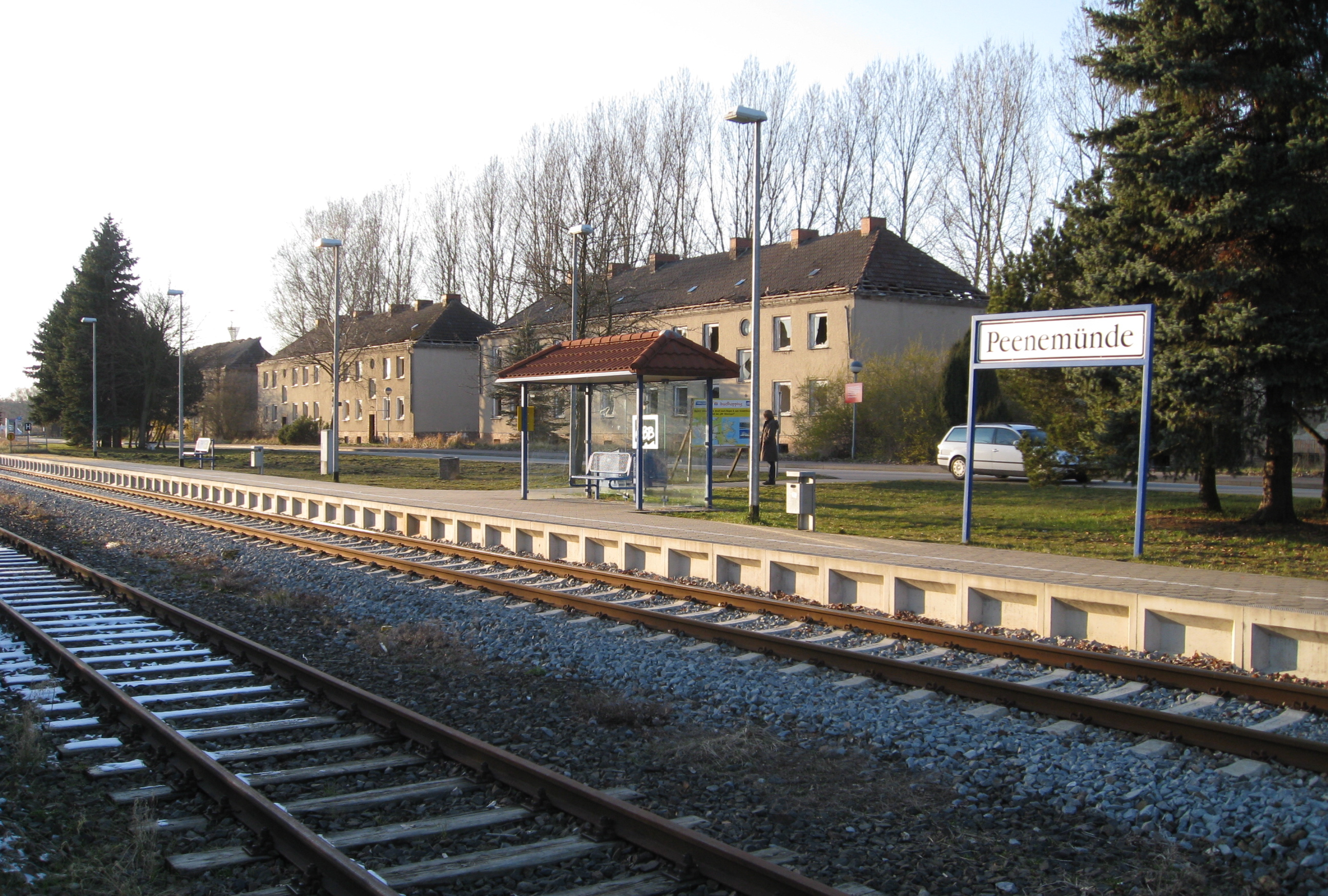
Peenemünde railway station for service to Zinnowitz

The village with its seaport is located on the westernmost extremity of a long sand-spit, where the Peene empties into the Baltic Sea, in the northwestern part of Usedom Island. To the southeast it borders on the sea resort of Karlshagen.

Peenemünde harbour can be reached by ferry boat across the Peene from Kröslin. Liners also run along the Baltic coast to Rügen Island. The local railway station is the northern terminus of the Usedomer Bäderbahn line to Zinnowitz. Air service for the village is available at the Peenemünde Airfield.

== History ==
=== Early history ===
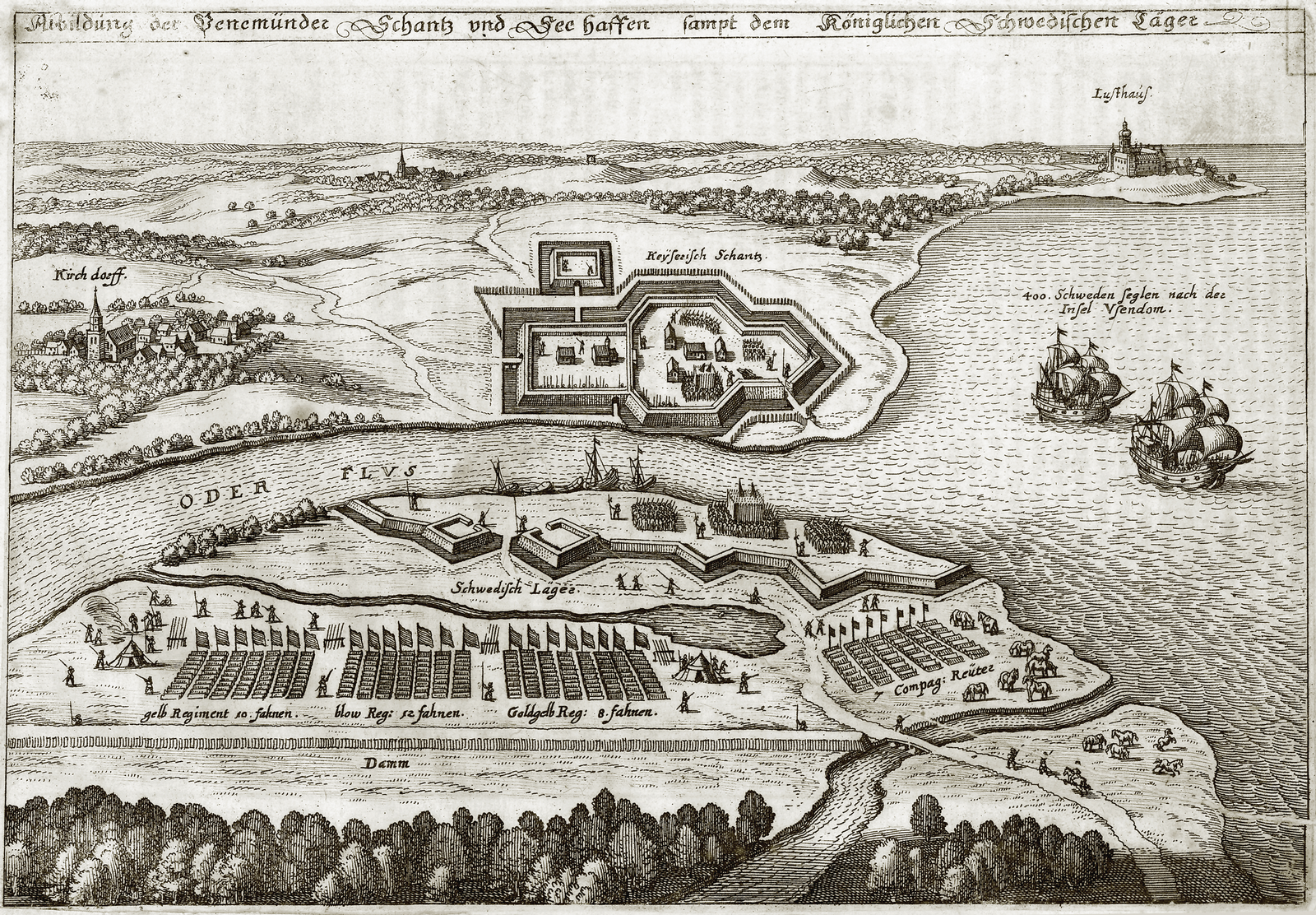
Swedish naval landing in 1630

During the 10th and 11th centuries, Peenemünde was part of the region of Circipania, an area settled by the Circipanes, a West Slavic tribe constituent of the Lutici federation. Circipania was incorporated into the Billung March of the Holy Roman Empire in 936, but the Empire's influence in the region decayed by the end of that century after a successful Slavic uprising. During the late 12th century, in the aftermath of the Wendish Crusade, the region fell under the rule of the Duchy of Pomerania. After the Treaty of Kremmen in 1236, most of Circipania was transferred to the Margraviate of Brandenburg. The settlement was first mentioned in 1282 under Bogislaw IV, Duke of Pomerania.

The settlement was captured by Sweden in 1630, confirmed by the Peace of Westphalia in 1648. In 1720, it passed to Prussia. It was besieged by Sweden during the Pomeranian War in 1757.

=== World War II ===
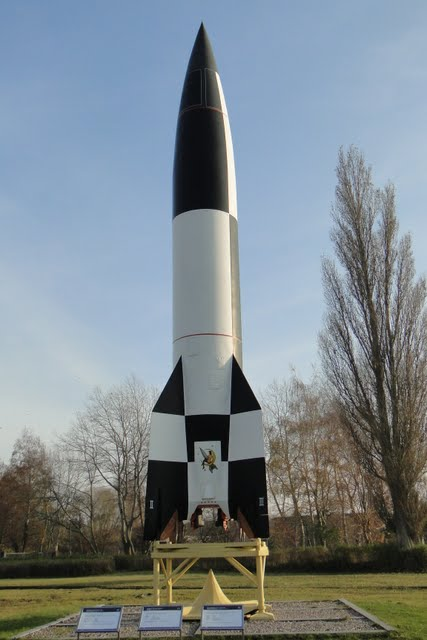
V-2 rocket

In World War II, the area was highly involved in the development and production of the V-1 and V-2 rockets, until the production's relocation to Mittelbau-Dora near Nordhausen. The village's docks were used for the ships which recovered V-2 wreckage from test launches over the Baltic Sea. German scientists such as Wernher von Braun, who worked at the V-2 facility, were known as "Peenemünders". The resistance group around the priest Heinrich Maier passed on plans for the V-1, V-2 rockets, and the Peenemünde research station to the Allies. The resistance group, later discovered by the Gestapo, was in contact with Allen Dulles, the head of the US secret service OSS in Switzerland. The allied bombers were able to carry out precise air attacks with the sketches of the production facilities. The information was important for Operation Crossbow and Operation Hydra, both pre-missions for Operation Overlord.

During Operation Hydra, the research facility was badly hit by the attack by the RAF bomber command on Peenemünde on the night of August 17–18, 1943. The attack was carried out by a total of 596 bombers (324 Avro Lancaster, 218 Handley Page Halifax, 54 Short Stirling). There was extensive destruction and the rocket launch of the prototype V-2 was delayed by about two months. 123 people died, including the scientist Walter Thiel. Wernher von Braun was able to save himself in a bunker. The entire island was captured by the Soviet Red Army on 5 May 1945. The gas plant for the production of liquid oxygen still lies in ruins at the entrance.

=== Post-war period ===
The post-war port was used as a Soviet naval base, then handed over to the armed forces of East Germany in 1952. The seaport facilities were used at first by the East German Seepolizei (sea police) after new facilities for police motorboats had been built. On 1 December 1956 the headquarters of the First Flotilla (de:Erste Flottille (Volksmarine)) of the East German People's Navy was established at Peenemünde.

The Peenemünde Historical Technical Museum, a World War II museum on the European Route of Industrial Heritage opened in 1992 in the power station of the former Army Testing Site and the area of the World War II power station (now part of the village). Exhibits include a V-1 and a V-2.
