= Moyecques =

Coordinates: 50.848°N 1.768°E

Moyecques (French pronunciation: [mɔjɛk]) is a small hamlet within the commune of Landrethun-le-Nord in the Pas-de-Calais department in the Nord-Pas-de-Calais region of France. It took its name from a local landowner, Guffridus [Geoffrey] de Moykes, at the start of the 13th century. There were originally three settlements named after Guffidus, all with Flemish names: Oist Moieques (East Moieques, today's village of Moyecques), Midel Moieques (now the tiny hamlet of Mimoyecques just to the west of Moyecques) and West Moieques. By the 17th century the lordship of Moyecques had been unified with that of Landrethun, moving from Fiennes.

Today Moyecques is best known as the site of the Fortress of Mimoyecques, the modern name for an underground base built by Nazi Germany during the Second World War to house the V-3 cannon that was intended to bombard London.
