= Joseph P. Kennedy Jr. =

American naval aviator (1915–1944)

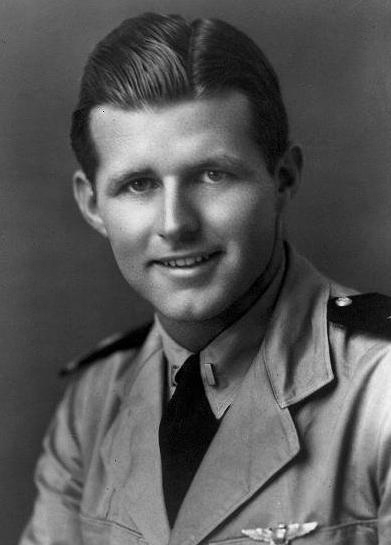
- Kennedy, c. 1942
- Born: Joseph Patrick Kennedy Jr. July 25, 1915; Hull, Massachusetts, U.S.
- Died: August 12, 1944 (aged 29); Over Blythburgh, East Suffolk, England
- Cause of death: Naval airplane explosion during Operation Aphrodite
- Resting place: Remains never recovered
- Education: Harvard University (BA); London School of Economics
- Occupation: Naval aviator
- Political party: Democratic
- Parents: Joseph P. Kennedy Sr.; Rose Fitzgerald Kennedy
- Relatives: Kennedy family
- Military career
- Burial place: Cambridge American Cemetery and Memorial; Cambridge, England
- Allegiance: United States
- Branch: United States Navy
- Service years: 1941–1944
- Rank: Lieutenant
- Units: Patrol Squadron 203; Bombing Squadron 110, Special Air Unit 1
- Conflicts: World War II
- Awards: Navy Cross; Distinguished Flying Cross; Purple Heart; Air Medal

Joseph Patrick Kennedy Jr. (July 25, 1915 – August 12, 1944) was an American naval aviator who was a lieutenant in the U.S. Navy. He was a member of the Kennedy family and the oldest of the nine children born to Joseph P. Kennedy Sr. and Rose Fitzgerald Kennedy. During World War II, Kennedy was killed in action while serving as a land-based patrol bomber pilot, and posthumously awarded the Navy Cross.

Kennedy's father had aspirations for him to become President of the United States. Kennedy was a delegate to the 1940 Democratic National Convention and planned to run for a seat in the U.S. House of Representatives after his military service as the first stepping stone on the path to the presidency. Kennedy's death while participating in Operation Aphrodite in August 1944 caused his father to transfer his aspirations to his next-oldest son, John F. Kennedy, who followed the path first planned for his older brother by advancing from the House to the U.S. Senate and then to the presidency.

== Early life and education ==
Joseph Patrick Kennedy, Jr. was born on July 25, 1915, at a summer rental cottage on Nantasket Beach in Hull, Massachusetts. He first attended the Dexter School in Brookline, Massachusetts, with his brother John. In 1933, Kennedy graduated from Choate, a preparatory boarding school in Wallingford, Connecticut. After high school, he spent a year studying under the tutelage of Harold Laski at the London School of Economics. Kennedy then entered Harvard College, graduating in 1938 with a Bachelor of Arts degree. He participated in football, rugby, and crew and served on the student council. After college, Kennedy enrolled at Harvard Law School, but interrupted his studies to enlist in the Navy. Kennedy had dated Athalia Ponsell, who was murdered in 1974, and there were rumors of an engagement between them until his death.

== Political ambitions and views ==
From a very young age, Kennedy was groomed by his father and predicted to be the first Roman Catholic U.S. president. When he was born, Kennedy's maternal grandfather, John F. Fitzgerald, the mayor of Boston, told reporters: "This child is the future president of the nation."

Kennedy was a Massachusetts delegate to the Democratic National Convention in 1940. He planned to run for a seat in the U.S. House of Representatives when the war ended.

Kennedy expressed approval of Adolf Hitler before World War II began. When his father sent him to visit Nazi Germany in 1934, Joseph Jr. wrote back and praised the Nazi sterilization policy as "a great thing" that "will do away with many of the disgusting specimens of men." Kennedy Jr. explained, "Hitler is building a spirit in his men that could be envied in any country."

Kennedy changed his opinion in 1939 under the influence of Aimée de Heeren, a Brazilian secret service agent based in Paris.

== U.S. Navy ==
Kennedy left before his final year at Harvard Law School to enlist in the U.S. Naval Reserve on June 24, 1941. Kennedy entered flight training to be a naval aviator, received his wings, and was commissioned an ensign on May 5, 1942. Kennedy was assigned to Patrol Squadron 203 and then Bombing Squadron 110. In September 1943, he was sent to Britain and became a member of Bomber Squadron 110, Special Air Unit ONE the following year. Kennedy piloted land-based Consolidated B-24 Liberator patrol bombers on anti-submarine details during two tours of duty in the winter of 1943–1944.

Kennedy was promoted to lieutenant on July 1, 1944. He had completed 25 combat missions and was eligible to return home, but instead volunteered for an Operation Aphrodite mission.

=== Operations Aphrodite and Anvil ===
Operation Aphrodite was the use of Army Air Corps Boeing B-17 Flying Fortress and Navy Consolidated PB4Y-1 Liberator bombers that were converted into flying bombs and deliberately crashed into their targets under radio control from an accompanying bomber. They were to be used for precision attacks on well-protected targets. These "drone" aircraft could not take off safely on their own and so a crew of two would take off and fly to 2,000 feet (610 m) altitude before they activated the remote control system, armed the detonators, and parachuted from the aircraft. After trials, the first mission took place on August 4, 1944, against targets including the Fortress of Mimoyecques, an underground military complex under construction in northern France. There was little success.

The U.S. Navy also participated in Operation Aphrodite, with its portion referred to as Operation Anvil. Kennedy had been promoted to lieutenant on July 1. After the U.S. Army Air Corps operation missions were drawn up on July 23, lieutenants Wilford John Willy and Kennedy were designated as the Navy's first Anvil flight crew. Willy, who was the executive officer of Special Air Unit 1, had also volunteered for the mission and pulled rank over Ensign James Simpson, who was Kennedy's regular co-pilot.

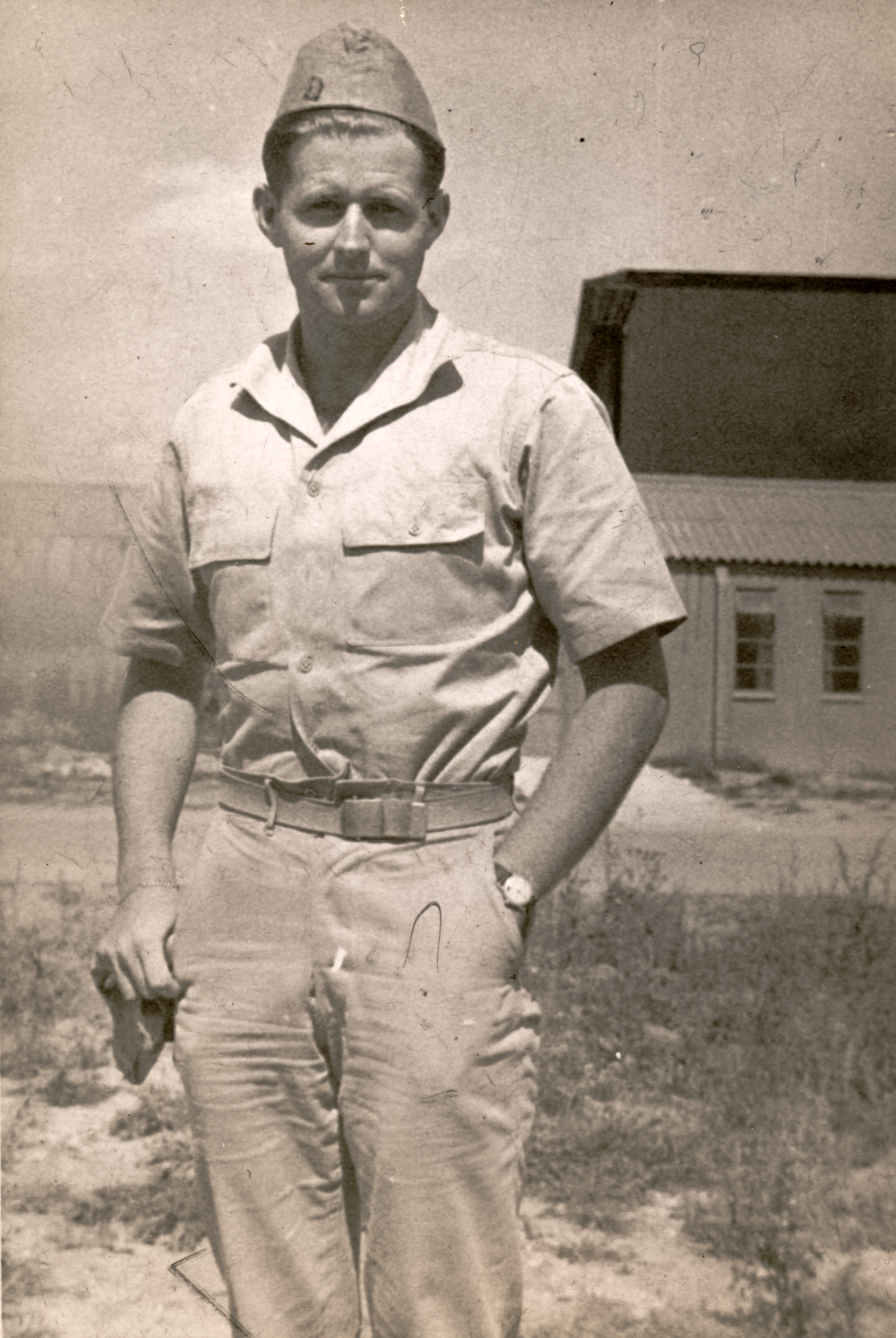
Last known photograph of Joseph P. Kennedy Jr. on August 12, 1944

On August 12, Kennedy and his co-pilot Willy flew a BQ-8 "robot" aircraft (a converted B-24 Liberator) for the Navy's first Aphrodite mission. Initially, two Lockheed Ventura mother planes and a Boeing B-17 navigation plane took off from RAF Fersfield, Norfolk, England at 1800 on Saturday, August 12, 1944. Then the BQ-8 aircraft, loaded with 21,170 lb (9,600 kg) of Torpex explosive, took off to be used against the suspected V-3 development site at Mimoyecques.

Following them in a USAAF photoreconnaissance F-8 Mosquito to film the mission were pilot Lieutenant Robert A. Tunnel and combat cameraman Lieutenant David J. McCarthy, who filmed the event from the perspex nose of the aircraft. As planned, Kennedy and Willy remained aboard as the BQ-8 completed its first remote-controlled turn at 2,000 ft (610 m) near the North Sea coast. Kennedy and Willy removed the safety pin, arming the explosive package, and Kennedy radioed the agreed code Spade Flush, his last known words. Two minutes later, and well before the planned crew bailout near RAF Manston in Kent, the explosives detonated prematurely, destroying the Liberator and instantly killing Kennedy and Willy. Wreckage landed near the village of Blythburgh in Suffolk, England, causing widespread damage and small fires, but there were no injuries on the ground. According to one report, 59 buildings were damaged in a nearby coastal town.

Attempted first Aphrodite attack Twelve August with robot taking off from Fersfield at One Eight Zero Five Hours. Robot exploded in the air at approximately two thousand feet eight miles southeast of Halesworth at One Eight Two Zero hours. Wilford J. Willy Sr Grade Lieutenant and Joseph P. Kennedy Jr Grade Lieutenant, both USNR, were killed. Commander Smith, in command of this unit, is making full report TO US Naval Operations. A more detailed report will be forwarded to you when interrogation is completed

— Top Secret telegram to General Carl Andrew Spaatz from General Jimmy Doolittle, August 1944

According to USAAF records, the trailing Mosquito "was flying 300 feet above and about 300 yards to the rear of the robot. Engineer photographer on this ship was injured, and the ship was damaged slightly by the explosion." The Mosquito, which made an immediate emergency landing at RAF Halesworth, belonged to the 325th Reconnaissance Wing, a unit under the command of the son of President Franklin Roosevelt, then Colonel Elliott Roosevelt, who years later claimed to have been aboard that trailing aircraft, and his version of the event has gained wide currency. However, Air Force records cannot substantiate it. Instead, an after-action account by the 8th Combat Camera Unit (CCU) noted:

...the Baby just exploded in mid-air as we neared it and I was knocked halfway back to the cockpit. A few pieces of the Baby came through the plexiglass nose and I got hit in the head and caught a lot of fragments in my right arm. I crawled back to the cockpit and lowered the wheels so that Bob could make a quick emergency landing,...

— Lieutenant McCarthy reporting from his hospital bed.

The eighth CCU film of the event has not been found.

The 20th Fighter Group out of RAF Kings Cliffe, Northamptonshire had provided an escort of four North American P-51 Mustang fighters (two each from the 55th and 79th Fighter Squadrons). VIII FC, Field Order 509 stated "20 GP (P-51's, 4 A/C) will proceed to Fersfield and land coordinating with operations where to provide close escort support to one B-34 special Operation."

Lieutenant John E. Klink noted in his mission summary report: "Took off to excort BXXX, 1 B24, 1 B17, 2 B34s, and 3 photo Recons (2 Mosq. -1 P38). When specially loaded B24 was at approx. 2000 ft. NE of Ipswich it exploded and crashed near small lake. No one got out of the plane. Rest of ships OK in spite of terrific concussion from explosion. All returned to base." [sic]

=== Accident investigation ===
Drone operations were suspended for a month while equipment was re-evaluated and modified, and there would be no further Navy missions. The Navy's informal board of review, discussing a number of theories, discounted the possibility of the crew making a mistake. It suspected jamming or a stray signal could have armed and detonated the explosives. An electronics officer, Earl Olsen, who believed the wiring harness had a design defect, had warned Kennedy of that possibility the day before the mission but was ignored.

Later reports that Kennedy's final mission was kept top secret until many years later are negated by a detailed public account of the operation and Kennedy's death released in October 1945.

== Recognition and commemoration ==
Kennedy and Willy were both posthumously awarded the Navy Cross, the Air Medal, and the Purple Heart. The names of both men are listed on the Tablets of the Missing at the Cambridge American Cemetery and Memorial, a cemetery and chapel near the village of Madingley, Cambridgeshire, that commemorates Americans who died in World War II.

A commemorative headstone cenotaph for Joseph P. Kennedy Jr. was later erected at Arlington National Cemetery, and a further memorial to him stands inside the fortress of Mimoyecques, France.

In the great reading room of the Harvard Law School Library located in Langdell Hall, there is an inscription engraved in marble on either side of a doorway, honoring and listing the names of Joseph Patrick Kennedy, Jr. and other young men of the Harvard Law School who interrupted their studies to serve in World War II and were killed in action. On either side of an opposing doorway on the opposite end of the great reading room, there is a similar monument that honors Harvard Law School students who were killed in action during World War I.

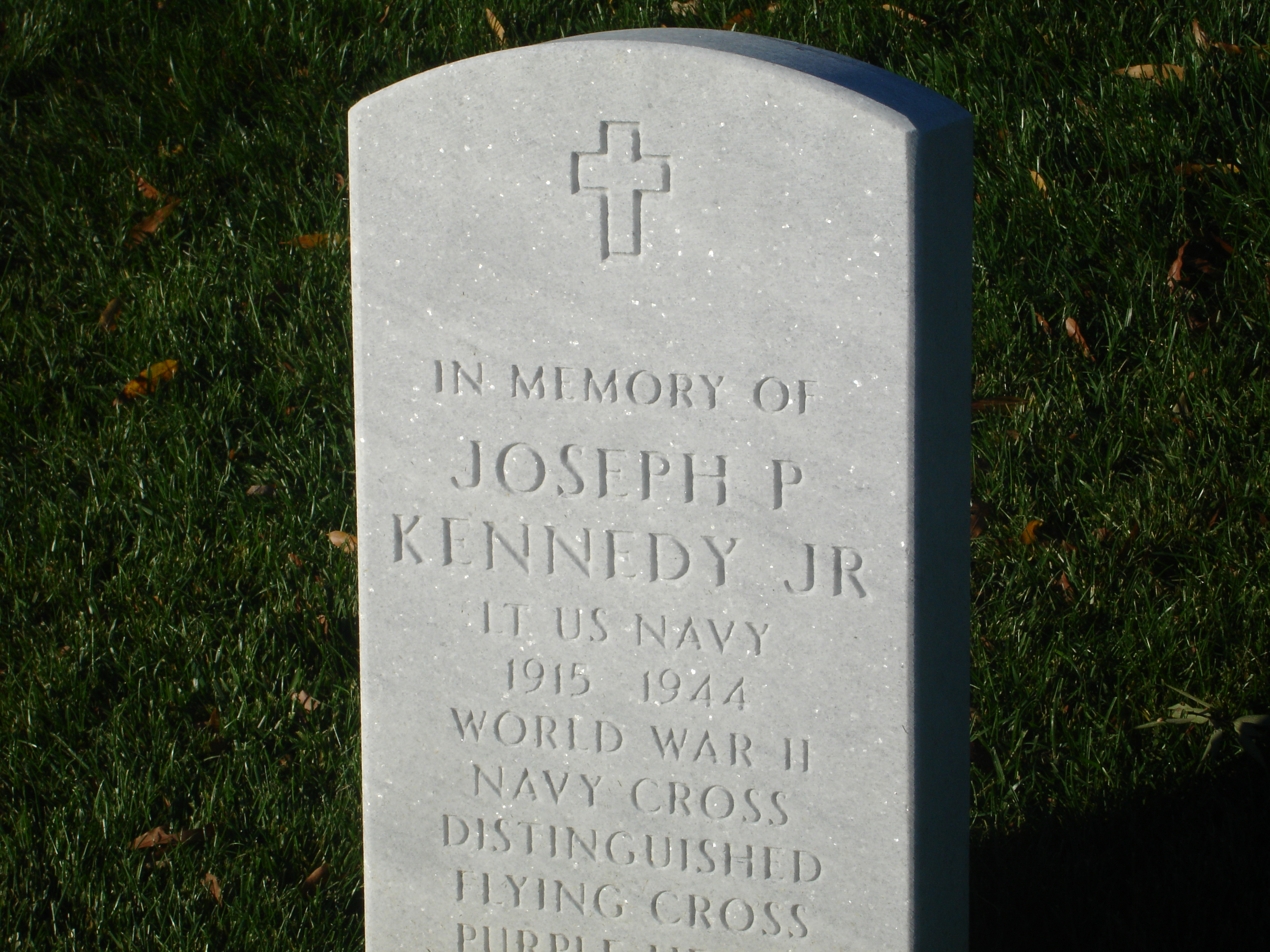
Cenotaph at Arlington National Cemetery

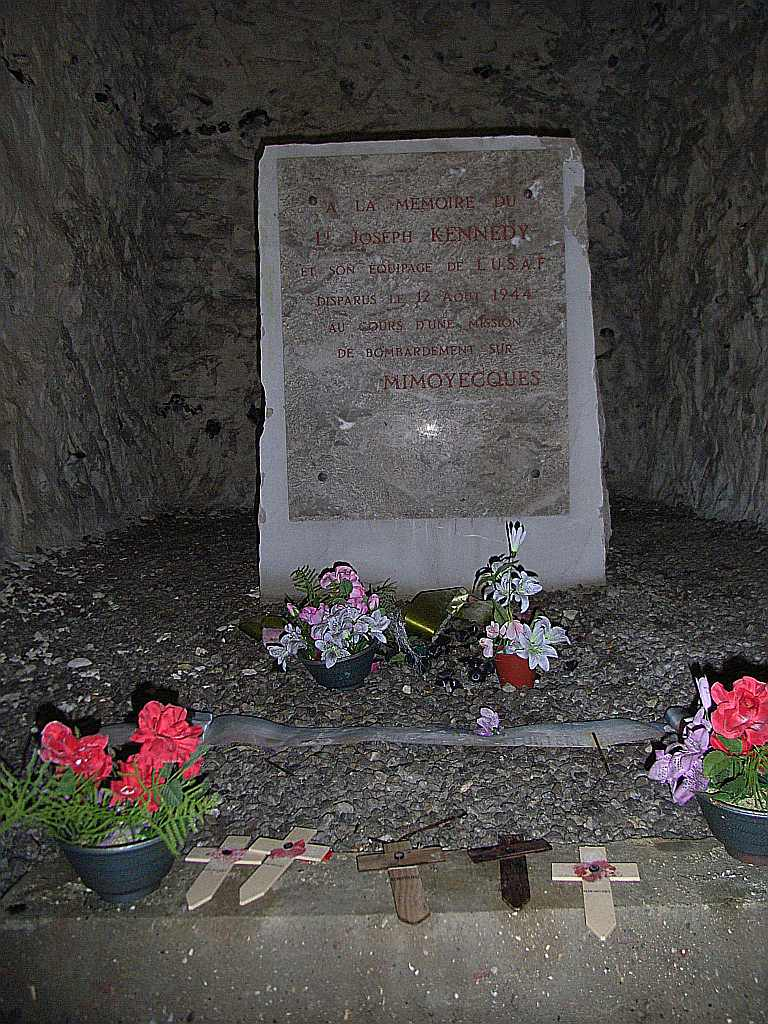
Memorial inside the fortress of Mimoyecques, France

=== Military awards ===
Kennedy's military decorations and awards include the following:

Navy Cross		Distinguished Flying Cross
Purple Heart	Air Medal	American Defense Service Medal
American Campaign Medal w/star	European-African-Middle; Eastern Campaign Medal w/star	World War II Victory Medal

Joseph P. Kennedy Jr.'s Navy Cross citation reads:

The President of the United States of America takes pride in presenting the Navy Cross (Posthumously) to Lieutenant Joseph Patrick Kennedy, United States Navy, for extraordinary heroism in operations against the enemy while serving as Commander of a Navy Liberator Patrol Plane in Bombing Squadron ONE HUNDRED TEN (VB-110), Special Air Unit ONE (Europe), during a special air mission directed at Mimoyecques, France, on August 12, 1944. Well knowing the extreme dangers involved and totally unconcerned for his own safety, Lieutenant Kennedy unhesitatingly volunteered to conduct an exceptionally hazardous and special operational mission. Intrepid and daring in his tactics and with unwavering confidence in the vital importance of his task, he willingly risked his life in the supreme measure of service, and, by his great personal valor and fortitude in carrying out a perilous undertaking, sustained and enhanced the finest traditions of the United States Naval Service.

=== Legacy ===
In 1946, the Navy named a destroyer after Kennedy, the USS Joseph P. Kennedy Jr. aboard which his younger brother, the future U.S. Senator Robert F. Kennedy, briefly served. Among the highlights of its service are the blockade of Cuba during the Cuban Missile Crisis in 1962 and the afloat recovery teams for Gemini 6 and Gemini 7, both 1965 crewed spaceflights in NASA's Gemini program. It was decommissioned in 1973 and became a floating museum in Battleship Cove, Fall River, Massachusetts.

In 1947, the Kennedys established the Joseph P. Kennedy Jr. Foundation and funded the construction of the Joseph P. Kennedy Jr. Memorial Hall at Boston College, which is a part of Campion Hall and home to the college's Lynch School of Education. The foundation was led by his youngest brother, U.S. Senator Edward Kennedy, until his death in August 2009. In 1957, the Lieutenant Joseph Patrick Kennedy Junior Memorial Skating Rink was opened in Hyannis, Massachusetts, with funds from the Joseph P. Kennedy Jr. Foundation.

In 1969, Hank Searls wrote a biography of Joseph Jr., The Lost Prince: Young Joe, the Forgotten Kennedy. A television movie based on Searls' book won a primetime Emmy in 1977. Peter Strauss played Kennedy as an adult and Lance Kerwin played him as a teenager in the film. He was also portrayed in the 1990 TV miniseries The Kennedys of Massachusetts by Campbell Scott and in the 1993 TV miniseries JFK: Reckless Youth by Loren Dean. He is also character in the musical Grey Gardens which has him getting engaged to Little Edie. He will be portrayed by Nick Robinson in the upcoming miniseries Kennedy.

== See also ==
- Kennedy curse
- Kennedy family
- Young Joe, the Forgotten Kennedy, a 1977 TV movie
