= Operation Aphrodite =

- Part of World War II
- Locations: Northern France; Germany
- Planned: 1944
- Planned by: Jimmy Doolittle
- Date: August 4, 1944 – January 1, 1945
- Executed by: United States Army Air Forces
- Outcome: Failure

Operation Anvil
- Part of World War II
- Location: Europe
- Date: August 12 – September 3, 1944
- Executed by: United States Navy
- Outcome: Failure

Aphrodite, BQ-7, BQ-8
- Type: Radio-controlled aircraft as guided missiles
- Place of origin: United States

Service history
- In service: 1944
- Used by: United States Army Air Forces (Aphrodite); United States Navy (Anvil)

Specifications
- Warhead: Payload: around 20,000 lb (9,100 kg) Torpex
- Guidance system: Azon (TV sensor, radio control); Castor (radar & TV sensors, radio control)

Aphrodite was the Second World War code name of a United States Army Air Forces operation to use worn out Boeing B-17 Flying Fortress and Consolidated PB4Y bombers as radio controlled flying bombs against bunkers and other hardened or reinforced enemy facilities.

A parallel project by the United States Navy was codenamed Anvil. The missions were generally unsuccessful, and the intended targets in Europe were either overrun by the ground advance of Allied troops or disabled by conventional attacks by aircraft.

== Background ==
The plan called for B-17E/Fs that had been taken out of operational service (various nicknames existed, such as "robot", "baby", "drone" or "weary Willy") to be loaded to capacity with explosives, and flown by radio control into bomb-resistant fortifications such as German U-boat pens and V-weapon sites.

The German offensive against London with the V-1 flying bomb, a jet-powered autopilot weapon, began in June 1944. This increased interest in the use of aircraft loaded with explosives and directed onto targets by remote control which was already under consideration,

By late 1943, General Henry H. Arnold, General commanding the USAAF, had directed Brigadier General Grandison Gardner's electronic engineers at Eglin Field, Florida, to outfit war-weary bombers with automatic pilots so that they could be remotely controlled.

The plan was first proposed to Major General Jimmy Doolittle, commander in chief of the US Eighth Air Force sometime in 1944. Doolittle approved the plan for Operation Aphrodite on 26 June and assigned the 3rd Bombardment Division with preparing and flying the drone aircraft, which was to be designated BQ-7. The USAAF also planned to outfit war-weary B-24 Liberators with explosives and automatic pilots to be used against defended targets in Japan, under the designation BQ-8.

USSTAF officially ordered Project Aphrodite on 23 June, and the 8th Air Force was directed to conduct the "development and operational trials." There was no specific equipment in the UK, so the Azon bomb control system was adapted for use. There was an experimental Azon unit at RAF Horsham St Faiths (458th Bombardment Group with Consolidated B-24 Liberators) that supplied control aircraft, crews, and technical expertise.

The final assignment of responsibility was given to the 562nd Bomb Squadron at RAF Honington in Suffolk, England. Similarly, on 6 July 1944, the U.S. Navy Special Attack Unit (SAU-1) was formed under ComAirLant, with Commander James A. Smith, Officer in Charge, for transfer without delay to Commander Fleet Air Wing 7 in Europe to attack German V-1 and V-2 sites with PB4Y-1s converted to assault drones.

== Project history ==
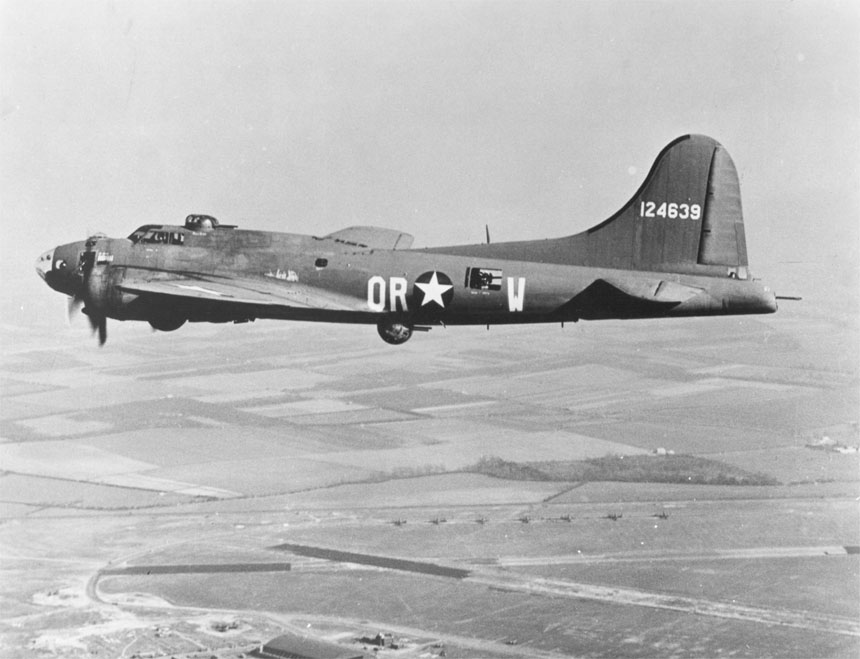
B-17F (The Careful Virgin) completed 80 missions with 323rd Bombardment Squadron before it was used against Mimoyecques but impacted short of target due to controller error

At RAF Honington, B-17F and B-17G Flying Fortress bombers were stripped of all normal combat armament and all other non-essential gear (armor, turrets and guns, bomb racks, radio transceiver, seats, etc.), relieving them of about 12,000 lb (5,400 kg) of weight.

The aircraft were fitted out at Burtonwood in Cheshire (the major servicing station for all USAAF aircraft in the UK) with Azon radio remote-control equipment. Azon (a contraction of "azimuth only") could only provide one axis of movement, so two sets were needed for each drone aircraft. Two television cameras were fitted: one in the cockpit to show the main instrumentation panel and one in the nose to show a forward view during the target run, to be transmitted back to an accompanying B-17 "CQ-4" 'mothership'. A precision radio altimeter, connected to the aircraft's C1 autopilot, was fitted.

A whip aerial on the nose received control signals, and an antenna on the tail gun position transmitted the camera signal. To improve reception, the mother ship had a directional receiving aerial. A smoke canister under the aircraft could be used to leave a trail to improve observation by the mother ship. The drone was loaded with explosives weighing more than twice that of a B-17's normal bomb payload. The British Torpex ("Torpedo Explosive") used for the purpose was 50% more powerful than TNT alone. (Note: The explosive was loaded, as 55 lb boxes, in the bomb bay (210 boxes), radio room (100) and directly behind the cockpit (25)) The control equipment was wrapped with primer cord to ensure its destruction.

When the training program was complete, the 562nd Squadron had ten drones and four 'motherships' (three B-24s and a B-17G). On missions, the drone and its two motherships were accompanied by a small fighter escort (eight P-47s) and supported by a Mosquito flying ahead reporting on the weather.

A relatively remote location in Norfolk, RAF Fersfield, was the launch site. Initially, RAF Woodbridge to the south in Suffolk had been selected for its long runway, but the possibility of collision between a loaded drone and damaged aircraft that diverted to Woodbridge caused concern. (Note: There were ten drones, nine loaded with explosives and one with jellied petroleum, dispersed across Woodbridge. The tenth drone was to be used as a follow-up attack once one of the others had made a successful attack) Fersfield was allocated to the USAAF but otherwise unoccupied, and the transfer was made in July. At Fersfield they were joined by the US Navy's Special Air Unit No.1 (with volunteers drawn from maritime patrol units at Dunkeswell) and a Wright Airfield detachment working with television-guided bombs (codenamed "Batty")

The remote control system was insufficient for safe takeoff, so each drone was taken aloft by a volunteer crew of a pilot and a flight engineer to an altitude of 2,000 ft (600 m) before transfer of control to the CQ-4 operators. After successful turnover of control of the drone, the two-man crew would arm the payload and parachute out of the cockpit. The 'mothership' would then direct the missile to the target. To allow easier exit when the pilot and co-pilot were to parachute out, the usual escape hatch was removed, and the opening enlarged and modified for quicker egress, and on some aircraft, the cockpit roof was removed.

After failures in early August, the "double Azon" system was replaced with an improved system brought from the US, and missions were paused while this system was installed and tested. Aircraft with this fitted had the codename "Castor". The system was a single transmitter in the mother aircraft and a receiver in the 'robot'. The first mission with the Castor was on 11 September 1944. There had also been modifications to improve the visibility of the drone: Eureka/Rebecca radio equipment for the mother to home onto, the smoke dispenser (controlled by radio signal), and painting the upper surfaces of the drone yellow.

For Anvil missions, the US Navy provided their own controller aircraft, two Lockheed PV-1, and a B-17 accompanied it to receive the television signals.

The Castor missions were targeted against enemy installations that did not require long flights over enemy territory, reducing the likelihood of the drone being brought down by flak. The mother ships flew a different profile than before – now at the same altitude as the drone (2,000 to 2,500 ft or 610 to 760 m) but a couple of miles behind, then letting the gap increase to about six miles in the run-in on the target. In late October the targets for the remaining drones were changed to industrial sites deep in enemy territory. Remote control of the throttles was added so the drone could be flown at a higher altitude (10,000 ft or 3,000 m) before dropping to a lower one for the actual attack.

After the Anvil and Batty projects had left Fersfield, operations were transferred by the 3rd Division to the unit's parent base at RAF Knettishall, a few miles to the West and over the border in Suffolk, and missions from there began in December.

The USAAF wanted to transfer the program to the continent to attack industrial targets but the UK objected to this use of the drone in light of V-2 attacks on Britain. Approval was given in January but then rescinded before the end of the month. The program effectively ceased on 27 January 1945 when General Spaatz, (C-in-C USSTAF) sent an urgent message to Doolittle: "Aphrodite babies must not be launched against the enemy until further orders". The USSTAF made representations to President Roosevelt about use of Aphrodite against the Ruhr and a presidential telegram to Churchill on 31 March received a cautious agreement in April. However, the imminent end of the war in Europe led to the project being formally ended on 27 April.

It had been hoped that Operation Aphrodite and Operation Anvil would match the British success with 5-ton Tallboy and 10-ton Grand Slam ground penetration ("earthquake") bombs but the project was dangerous, expensive and ultimately unsuccessful. Of 14 missions flown, none resulted in the successful destruction of a target. Many aircraft lost control and crashed or were shot down by flak, and many pilots were killed, though a handful of aircraft scored near misses. One notable pilot death was that of Lieutenant Joseph P. Kennedy Jr., USNR, son of the former US Ambassador to the UK, who was expected to have a political career in the US and was the elder brother of future US President John F. Kennedy.

== Missions ==
Aphrodite, Anvil and other related missions
Target	Date	Aircraft	Notes
Mimoyecques, V-3 cannon battery	4 August 1944	1 B-17	Mission 515: Pilot Lt. Fain Pool and autopilot engineer "S. Sgt. Philip Enterline" successfully parachuted, and the drone spun out of control. Damage from Tallboy "earthquake" bombs on 6 July and the advance of Allied troops meant that construction on the site had already been stopped by 30 July.
Siracourt V-1 bunker	4 August 1944	B-17G 42-39835	Mission 515: The autopilot went into a climb when the remote control switched on, but the pilot was able to take control again. On a third attempt to hand over control, the bomber again went into a climb and, from there, into a stall. The radio operator escaped safely, but the pilot bailed out at low altitude just before the drone crashed in the woods at Sudbourne and was killed.
La Coupole, Wizernes; Blockhaus d'Éperlecques, Watten	4 August 1944	2 B-17s	Mission 515: One plane lost control after the first crewman bailed out, and crashed near Orford, making a huge crater and destroying more than 2 acres (8,100 m^{2}) of the surrounding countryside; the second crewman was killed. The view from the nose of the other drone was obscured as it came over the target, and it missed by several hundred feet (metres). (Alternate sources claim one hit 1,500 ft (460 m) short and one was shot down, and that one drone crashed killing one of the crew of two men).
Watten	6 August 1944	B-17 30342; B-17 30212 (Quarterback); B-17 31394	Crews abandoned the missiles without complications; a few minutes later one lost control and fell into the sea. Both 30342 and 31394 experienced control problems and crashed into the sea, while B-17 30342 "T'aint A Bird II" impacted at Gravelines, probably due to flak damage. The other also lost control, but turned inland and began to circle the important industrial town and port of Ipswich. After several minutes, it crashed harmlessly at sea.
Heligoland U-boat pens	August 1944		After modifications to change to a different control system, the second casualty of the operation was suffered during this mission when one pilot's parachute failed to open. The missile also failed, most likely shot down by flak before reaching the target.
Heide oil refinery	August 1944	4 drones	Three aircraft failed to reach their target due to control malfunctions, the fourth crashed near enough to cause significant damage and high casualties.
Mimoyecques	12 August 1944	PB4Y-1 32271 (Zoot Suit Black) (ex USAAF B-24J 42-110007)	Exploded prematurely over the Blyth estuary, East Anglia, killing Lieutenant Joseph P. Kennedy Jr. and Lieutenant Wilford J. Willy.
Le Havre naval base	13 August 1944	1 B-17G (42-40043) with two GB-4 bombs (Batty project)	Mission 549: Both 2,000 lb (910 kg) bombs missed the target. A supporting de Havilland Mosquito taking photos was too close to one when it exploded and was damaged. The pilot was taken prisoner, but the cameraman was killed. Subsequent operations on 19 and 26 August were also unsuccessful.
Heligoland U-boat pens	3 September 1944	PB4Y-1 63954	Second USN "Anvil" project mission. The controller lost sight of the aircraft and, with only TV images, flew the aircraft into a barracks nearby Düne Island by mistake.
Heligoland U-boat pens	11 September 1944	B-17F 42-30180	First use of a Castor aircraft. The pilot was killed (by parachute static line) while leaving the aircraft. Aircraft hit by enemy flak and crashed into the sea near target.
Hemmingstedt oil refinery	14 September 1944	B-17G 42-39827 & B-17F 42-30363 (Ruth L III)	Against the Hemmingstedt/Heide oil refinery target of the Oil Campaign (unsuccessfully attacked by conventional bombers on 4 August), both drones missed the target due to poor weather conditions.
Heligoland U-boat pens	15 October 1944	B-17 42-30039 (Liberty Belle); B-17 37743	42-30039 was hit by flak and came down into the sea short of the target. Second missed the "Nordsee III" pen due to poor weather conditions
Heligoland U-boat pens	30 October 1944	B-17 42-30066 (Mugwump, Rum Bogie II); B-17F 42-3438	Mission 693A: Two of five B-17s made an Aphrodite attack on Heligoland Island, Germany; escort was provided by seven P-47s. Concluding that the BQ-7 was not successful against 'hard targets', United States Strategic Air Forces Headquarters ordered that it be sent against industrial targets instead, and two more missions were flown. Bad weather prevented the primary target from being identified, and both aircraft were directed towards Berlin. 3438 soon crashed into the water due to low fuel. Lost control of 42-30066, which flew on course, taking it to Sweden where it crashed near Trollhättan after running out of fuel. The escorting aircraft had previously had to return due to low fuel.
Herford marshalling yard	5 December 1944	B-17G 42-39824; B-17F 42-30353 (Ten Knights in the Bar Room)	The target was not located due to cloud cover, so both were directed at the alternate target of Haldorf. Both crashed outside town.
Oldenburg power station	1 January 1945	B-17F 42-30178 Darlin' Dolly and B-17F 42-30237 Stump Jumper	Stump Jumper's pilot was Captain Jack L. Hodson, who received the Distinguished Flying Cross for his actions. Both aircraft were shot down by flak before reaching the target.
