= Lt. Joseph P. Kennedy Jr. Memorial Skating Rink =

Ice skating rink in Barnstable, Massachusetts, United States

- Kennedy Skating Rink
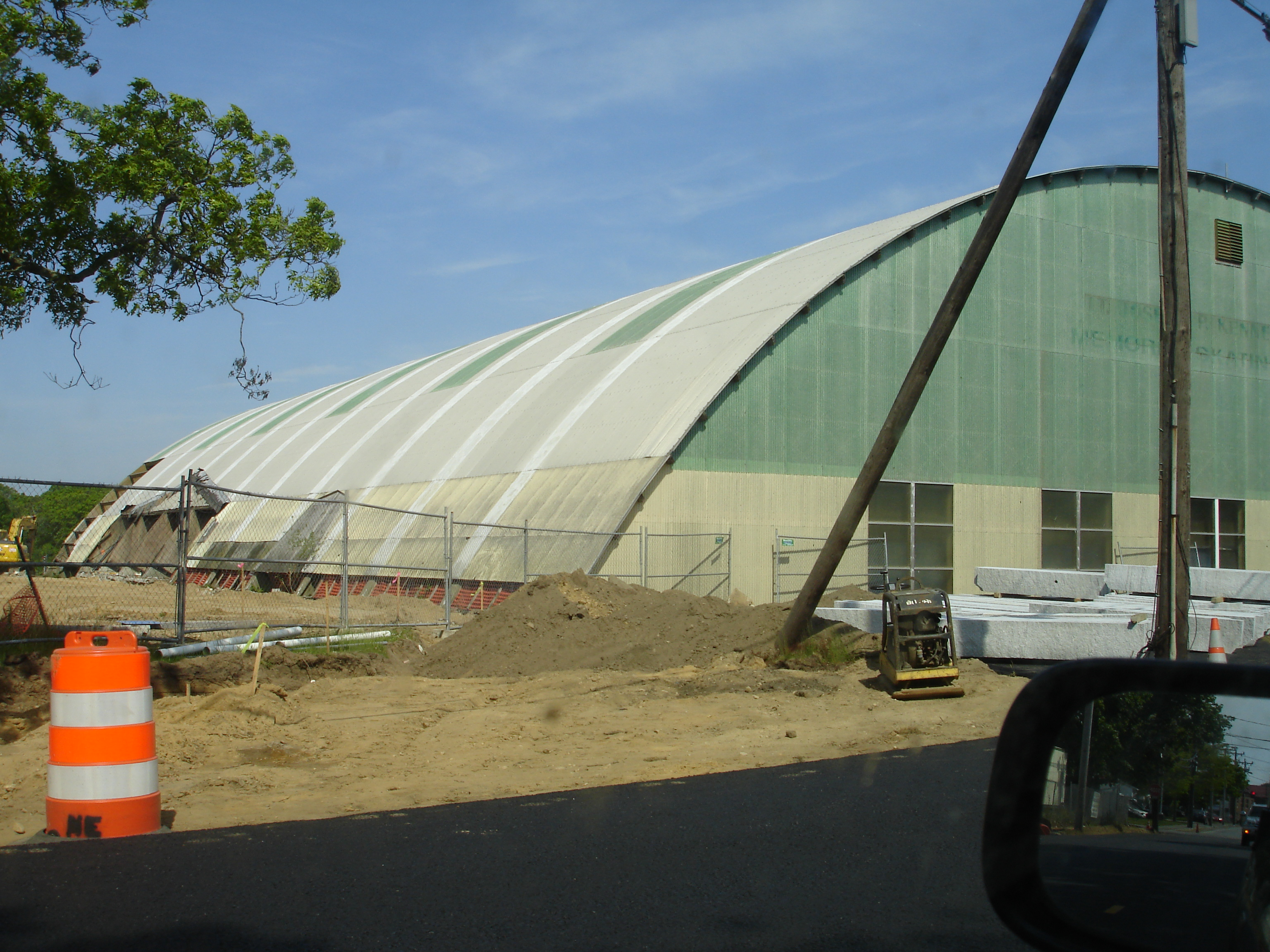
- The rink, pending demolition in 2009.
- Interactive map of Lt. Joseph P. Kennedy Jr. Memorial Skating Rink
- Full name: Lieutenant Joseph Patrick Kennedy Junior Memorial Skating Rink
- Location: Hyannis, Massachusetts
- Coordinates: 41°39′15.86″N 70°17′32.00″W
- Owner: Town of Barnstable
- Operator: Barnstable Department of Recreation
- Surface: Ice
- Scoreboard: Yes

Construction
- Groundbreaking: 1957
- Built: 1957
- Opened: 1957
- Renovated: 1965
- Closed: 2009

Tenant
- Barnstable High School

The Lieutenant Joseph Patrick Kennedy Junior Memorial Skating Rink was an ice skating rink in the town of Barnstable, Massachusetts, United States. It was named after the late Joseph P. Kennedy Jr., who was killed when his B-24 Liberator exploded during a bombing mission. The facility also doubled as an ice hockey rink for Barnstable High School. The last public skate occurred on March 22, 2009. It was replaced by the Hyannis Youth and Community Center.

== History ==
=== Opening ===
The Lt. Joseph P. Kennedy Jr. Memorial Skating Centre rink opened in 1957 as an open-air skating rink. It was built with funds from the Joseph P. Kennedy Jr. foundation, which made the name fitting. In 1960, the rink was extended in length from 185 to 215 feet, with its official 85 foot hockey width. At the time, this made it the second largest in the northeastern United States, behind one in West Point, New York. This was alright for skating during calm weather, but it was impossible to skate during a storm. Early skaters even had to shovel the ice after a snowfall. This led to it being enclosed in 1965.

Although the rink was enclosed, it was open to the outside warm air. This led to fog forming on some nights. It was also unable to be used during the summer, a thing that most modern rinks do not have to do. This shortcomings led to replacement plans.

For many years, the rink was home to Barnstable High School's after prom celebration. The rink was used until 2008 when it was temporarily relocated to the high school because of the demolition of the rink.

=== Replacement ===
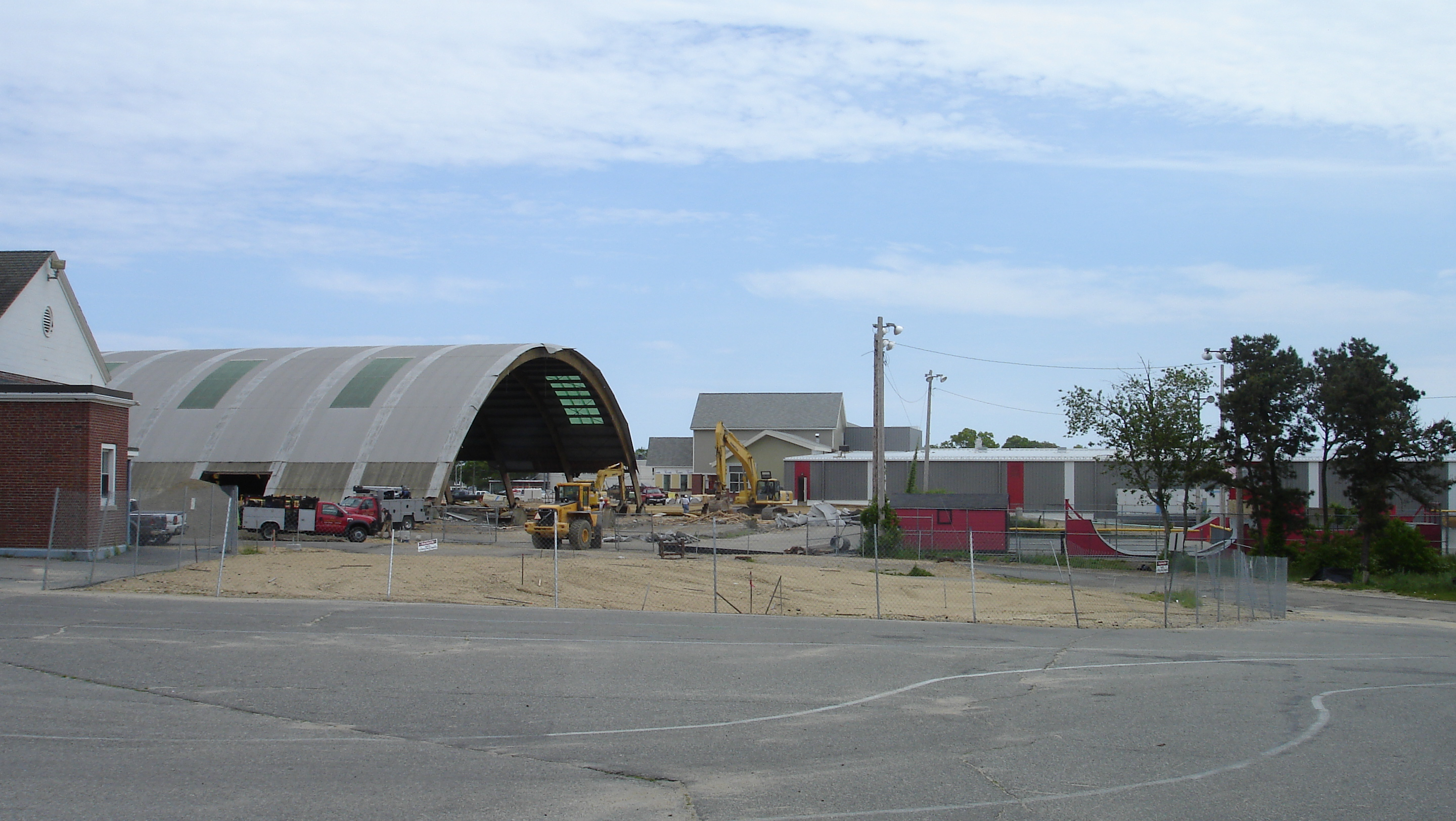
Demolition of the rink as viewed from the nearby Hyannis East Elementary School

In the early 2000s, there were plans to replace the rink with one rink next door in the Hyannis Youth and Community Center. The original plans for the center consisted of one rink and an adjacent youth center. The plan was eventually scrapped and new plans incorporated the usage of two rinks, one gymnasium, a youth center, and a raised jogging track around the gymnasium.

=== Closing ===
The rink held its last public skate on March 22, 2009. This brought to an end 52 years of skating at the rink. The rink was eventually torn down, with a marker was placed in the spot of the former rink's center ice. One of the rinks will carry on the name of Joseph P. Kennedy Jr., while the other was posthumously named after Patrick Butler, a local resident who was deeply involved in the project.

== See also ==
- Cape Cod Coliseum
