= Fortress of Mimoyecques =

Nazi German underground military complex in France

Fortress of Mimoyecques Wiese Bauvorhaben 711 Marquise-Mimoyecques
- Mimoyecques, near Landrethun-le-Nord (France)
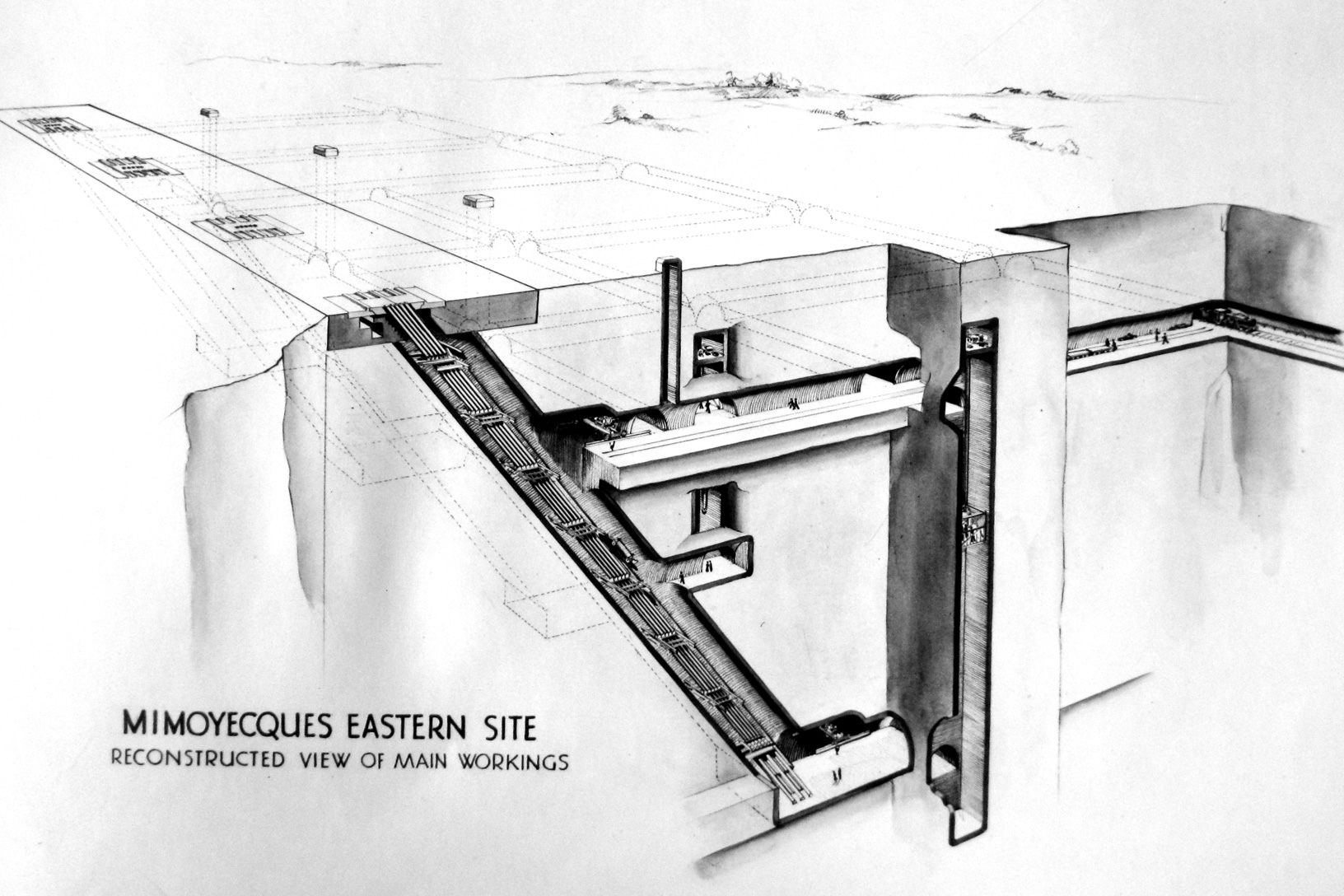
- Reconstructed view of the installation as originally planned

Site information
- Type: Bunker
- Owner: Conservatoire d'espaces naturels du Nord et du Pas-de-Calais
- Open to the public: Yes
- Website: mimoyecques.fr

Location
- Location within France
- Coordinates: 50.854°N 1.759°E

Site history
- Built: September 1943 – July 1944
- Built by: Organisation Todt
- In use: Never completed, captured 1944
- Materials: 150,000 cubic metres concrete
- Battles/wars: Operation Crossbow
- Events: Critically damaged 6 July 1944; Captured 5 September 1944; Opened as museum 1984, reopened 1 July 2010

Garrison information
- Garrison: Abteilung 705 (English: firing detachment 705)

The Fortress of Mimoyecques (French pronunciation: [mimɔjɛk]) is the modern name for a Second World War underground military complex built by the forces of Nazi Germany between 1943 and 1944. It was intended to house a battery of fixed V-3 cannons permanently aimed at London, 165 kilometres (103 mi) away. Originally codenamed Wiese ("Meadow") or Bauvorhaben 711 ("Construction Project 711"), it is located in the commune of Landrethun-le-Nord in the Pas-de-Calais department of northern France, near the hamlet of Mimoyecques about 20 kilometres (12 mi) from Boulogne-sur-Mer. It was constructed by a mostly German workforce recruited from major engineering and mining concerns, augmented by prisoner-of-war slave labour.

The complex consists of a network of tunnels dug under a chalk hill, linked to five inclined shafts in which 25 V-3 guns would have been installed, all aimed at London. The guns would have been able to fire ten dart-like explosive projectiles a minute – 600 rounds every hour – into the British capital, which Winston Churchill later commented would have constituted "the most devastating attack of all". The Allies knew nothing about the V-3 but identified the site as a possible launching base for V-2 ballistic missiles, based on reconnaissance photographs and fragmentary intelligence from French sources.

Mimoyecques was targeted for intensive bombardment by the Allied air forces from late 1943 onwards. Construction work was seriously disrupted, forcing the Germans to abandon work on part of the complex. The rest was partly destroyed on 6 July 1944 by No. 617 Squadron RAF, who used ground-penetrating 5,400-kilogram (12,000 lb) "Tallboy" earthquake bombs to collapse tunnels and shafts. This also entombed hundreds of slave workers underground. Though attempts were made to continue construction, the Germans soon halted work at Mimoyecques entirely as the Allies advanced up the coast following the Normandy landings. It fell to the Canadian 3rd Infantry Division on 5 September 1944 without resistance, a few days after the Germans withdrew from the area.

The complex was partly demolished just after the war on Churchill's direct orders (and to the great annoyance of the French, who were not consulted), as it was still seen as a threat to the United Kingdom. It was later reopened by private owners, first in 1969 to serve as a mushroom farm and subsequently as a museum in 1984. A nature conservation organisation acquired the Fortress of Mimoyecques in 2010, and La Coupole, a museum near Saint-Omer housing a former V-2 rocket base, took over its management. It continues to be open to the public as a vast underground museum complex.

== Background ==
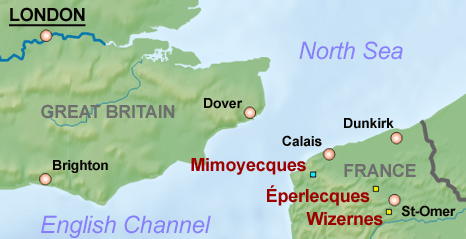
Map of the Pas-de-Calais and south-eastern England showing the location of Mimoyecques and other major V-weapons sites

In May 1943 Albert Speer, the Reich's Minister of Armaments and War Production, informed Adolf Hitler of work that was being carried out to produce a large-calibre gun capable of firing hundreds of shells an hour over long distances. The newly designed gun, codenamed the Hochdruckpumpe ("High Pressure Pump", HDP for short) and later designated as the V-3, was one of the V-weapons – Vergeltungswaffen ("retaliation or vengeance weapons") – developed by Nazi Germany in the later stages of the war to attack Allied targets.

Long-range guns were not a new development, but the high-pressure detonations used to fire shells from previous such weapons, including the Paris gun, rapidly wore out their barrels.

In 1942, August Coenders, inspired by previous designs of multi-chamber guns, suggested that the gradual acceleration of the shell by a series of small charges spread over the length of the barrel might be the solution to the problem of designing very long-range guns. Coenders proposed the use of electrically activated charges to eliminate the problem of the premature ignition of the subsidiary charges experienced by previous multi-chamber guns.

The HDP would have a smooth barrel over 100 metres (330 ft) long, along which a 97-kilogram (214 lb) finned shell (known as the Sprenggranate 4481) would be accelerated by numerous small low-pressure detonations from charges in branches off the barrel, each fired electrically in sequence. Each barrel would be 15 cm (5.9 in) in diameter.

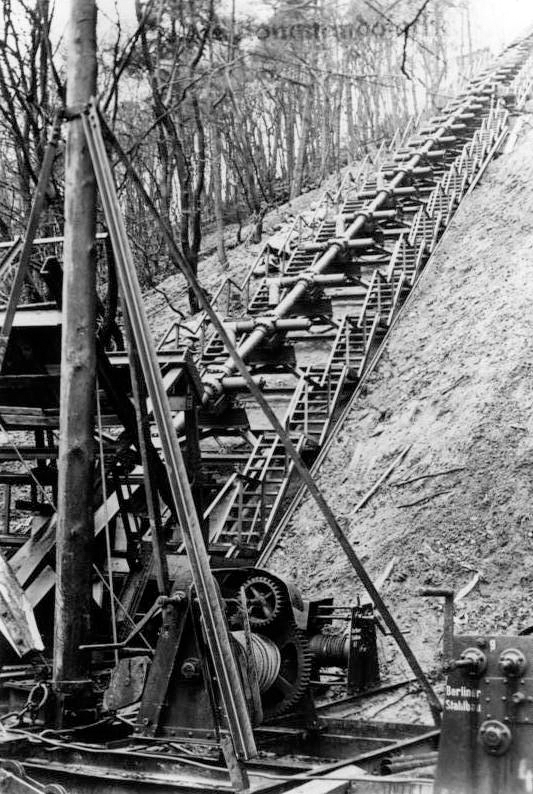
The prototype Hochdruckpumpe gun in 1942 at Laatziger Ablage (Misdroy), today Zalesie (Międzyzdroje), Poland. Site location: 53°53′53.91″N 14°26′18.92″E.

The gun was still in its prototype stages, but Hitler was an enthusiastic supporter of the idea and ordered that maximum support be given to its development and deployment. In August 1943 he approved the construction of a battery of HDP guns in France to supplement the planned V-1 and V-2 missile campaigns against London and the south-east of England. Speer noted afterwards:

On my suggestion, the Führer has decided that the risk must be stood to award contracts at once for the "high-pressure pump," without waiting for the results of firing trials. Maximum support is to be accorded to the experimental ranges at Hillersleben and Misdroy, and especially to the completion of the actual battery.

To reach England, the weapon needed barrels 127 metres (417 ft) long, so it could not be moved; it would have to be deployed from a fixed site. A study carried out in early 1943 had shown that the optimal location for its deployment would be within a hill with a rock core into which inclined drifts could be tunneled to support the barrels.

The site was identified by a fortification expert, Major Bock of the Festungs-Pionier-Stab 27 (Note: Literal translation "Fortress Pioneer Staff") of the Fifteenth Army based in the Dieppe area. A limestone hill near the hamlet of Mimoyecques, 158 metres (518 ft) high and 165 kilometres (103 mi) from London, was chosen to house the gun. It had been selected with care; the hill in which the facility was built is primarily chalk with very little topsoil cover, and the chalk layer extends several hundred metres below the surface, providing a deep but easily tunnelled rock layer. The chalk is easy to excavate and strong enough to dig tunnels without using timber supports. Although the site's road links were poor, it was only a few kilometres west of the main railway line between Calais and Boulogne-sur-Mer.

The area was already heavily militarised; as well as the fortifications of the Atlantic Wall on the cliffs of Cap Gris Nez to the northwest, there was a firing base for at least one conventional Krupp K5 railway gun about 5 kilometres (3.1 mi) to the south in the nearby quarries of Hidrequent-Rinxent.

== Design and construction ==
Construction began in September 1943 with the building of railway lines to support the work, and excavation of the gun shafts began in October. The initial layout comprised two parallel complexes approximately 1,000 metres (3,300 ft) apart, each with five drifts which were to hold a stacked cluster of five HDP gun tubes, for a total of 25 guns. The smoothbore design of the HDP would enable a much higher rate of fire than was possible with conventional guns. The entire battery would be able to fire up to 10 shots a minute, capable in theory of hitting London with 600 projectiles every hour. Both facilities were to be served by an underground railway tunnel of standard gauge, (Note: North entrance of railway tunnel: 50°51′32.15″N 1°45′49.75″E. South exit: 50°51′9.66″N 1°45′32.62″E) connected to the Calais–Boulogne main line, (Note: The branch line to Mimoyecques connected with the main line here: 50°50′41.63″N 1°48′44.69″E) and underground ammunition storage galleries which were tunneled at a depth of about 33 m (108 ft). The western site was abandoned at an early stage after being disrupted by Allied bombing, and only the eastern complex was built.

The drifts were angled at 50 degrees, reaching a depth of 105 m (344 ft). Owing to technical problems with the gun prototype, the scope of the project was reduced; drifts I and II were abandoned at an early date and only III, IV and V were taken forward. They came to the surface at a concrete slab or Platte 30 m (98 ft) wide and 5.5 m (18 ft) thick, in which there were narrow openings to allow the projectiles to pass through. The openings in the slab were protected by large steel plates, and the railway tunnel entrances were further protected by armoured steel doors. Each drift was oriented on a bearing of 299°, to the nearest degree – a direct line on Westminster Bridge. Although the elevation and direction of the guns could not be changed, it would have been possible to alter the range by varying the amount of propellant used in each shot. This would have brought much of London within range.

The railway tunnel ran in a straight line for a distance of about 630 m (2,070 ft) . Along its west side was an unloading platform which gave access to ten cross galleries (numbered 3–13 by the Germans), driven at right angles to the main tunnel at intervals of 24 metres (79 ft). Each gallery was fitted with a 600 mm (1 ft 11 5/8 in) gauge railway track. On the east side of the tunnel were chambers intended to be used as store rooms, offices and quarters for the garrison. Trains would have entered the facility and unloaded shells and propellant for the guns.

Maps and plans of the Mimoyecques site
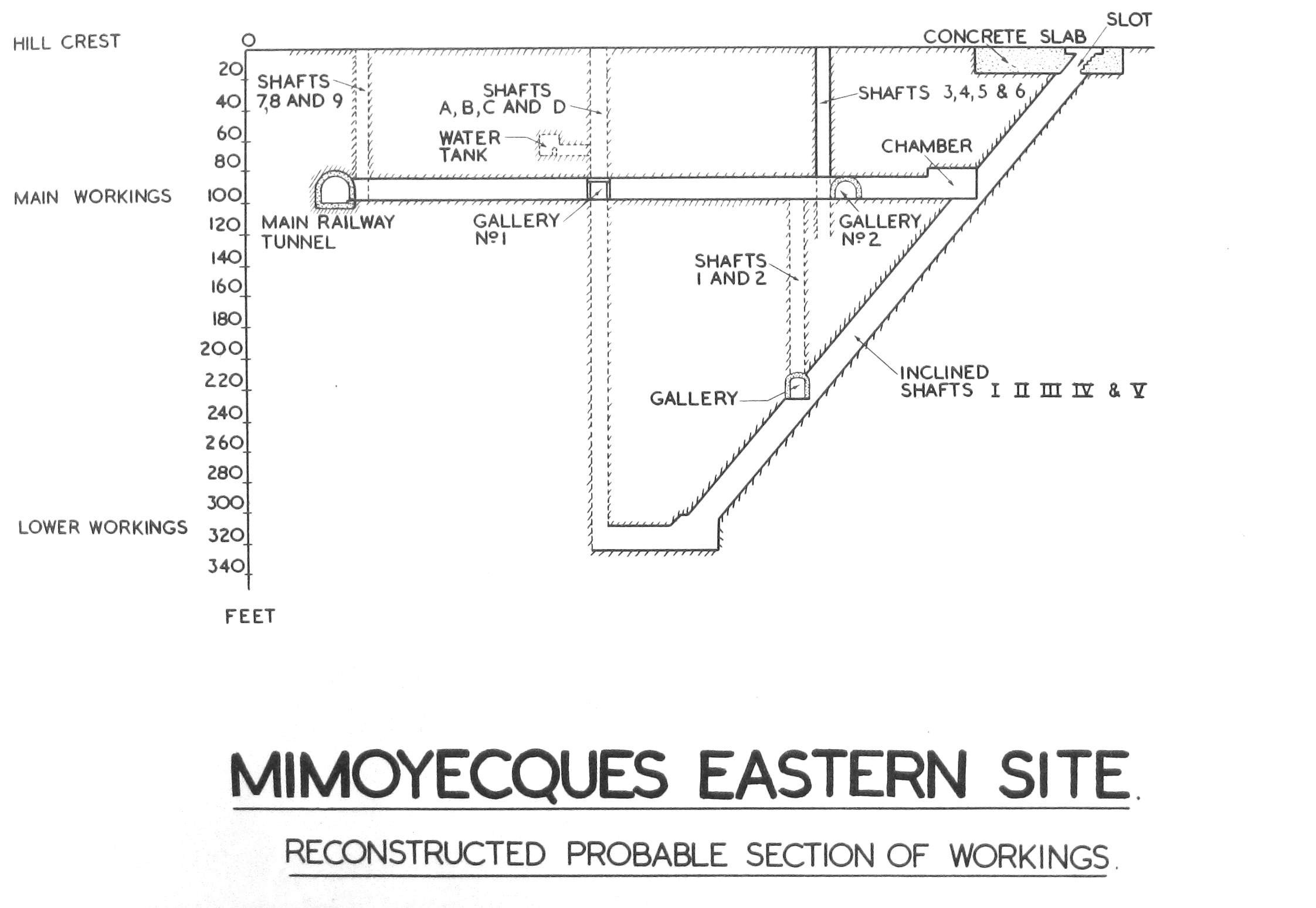
Cross-section of the Mimoyecques eastern site

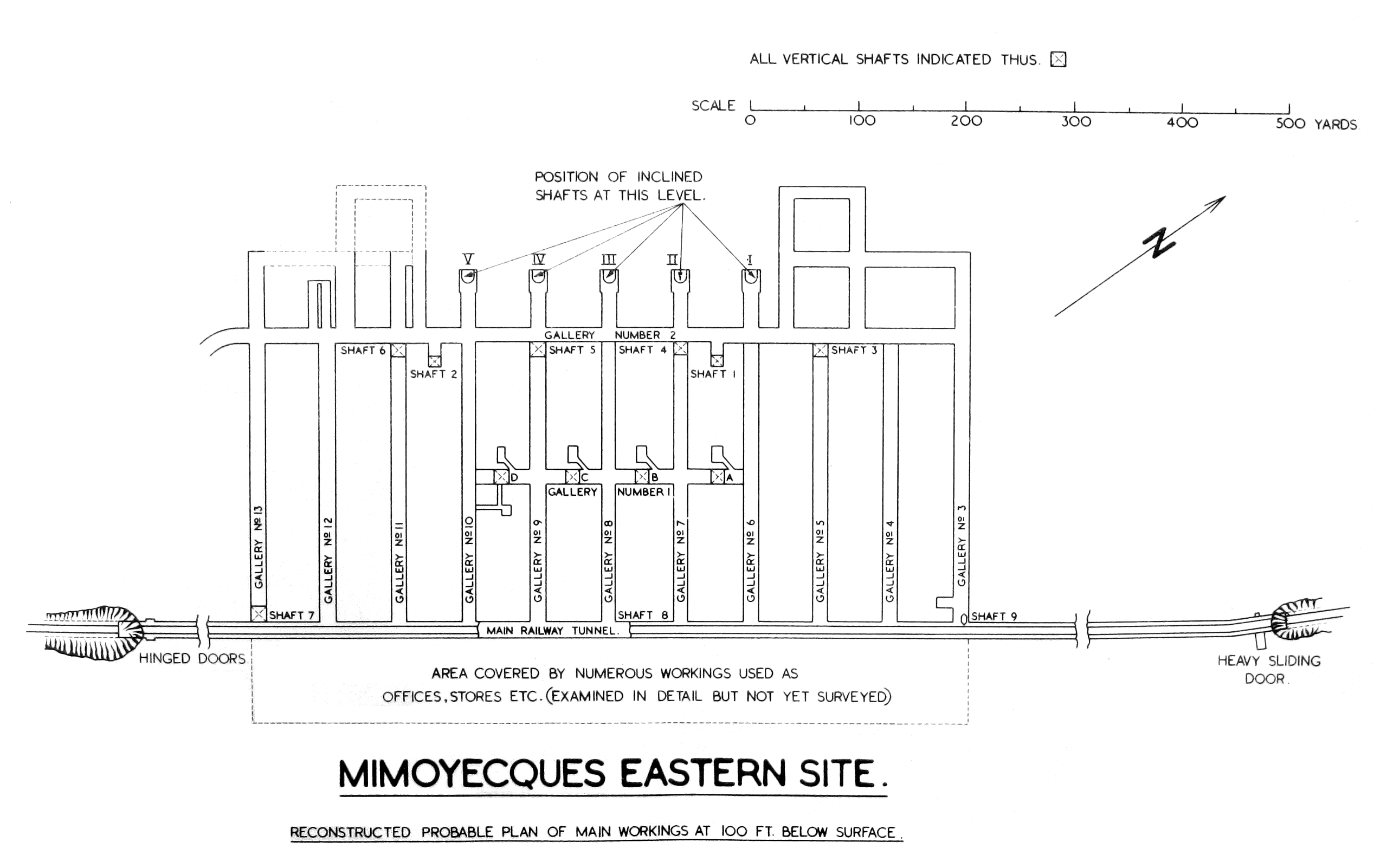
Plan of the Mimoyecques eastern site

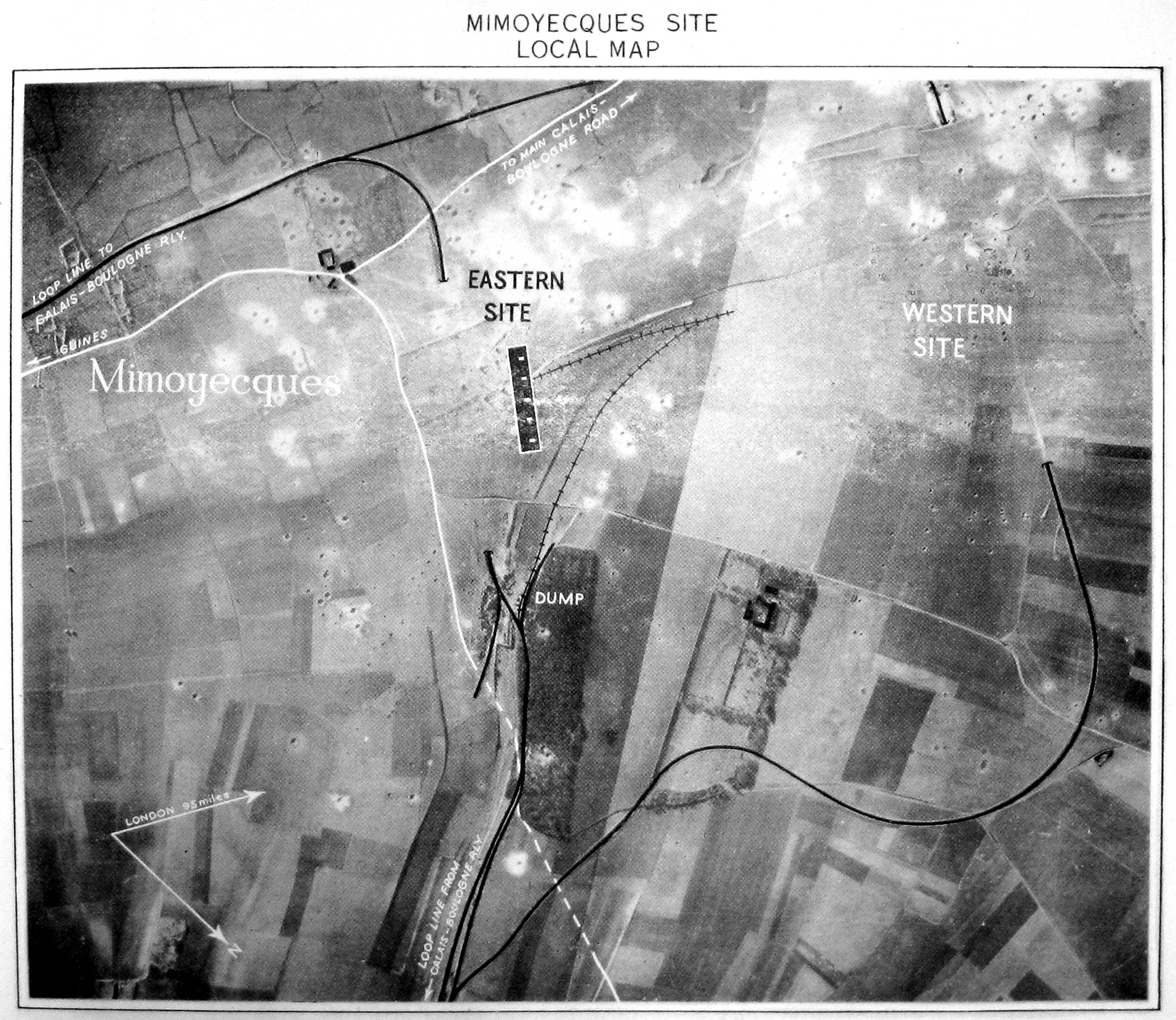
Photo map of the area around the two Mimoyecques sites

Galleries 6–10, the central group, gave access to the guns, while galleries 3–5 and 11–13 were intended for use as access tunnels and perhaps also storage areas. They were all connected by Gallery No. 2, which ran parallel to the main railway tunnel at a distance of 100 metres (330 ft). Galleries 6–10 were additionally connected by a second passageway, designated Gallery No. 1, running parallel to the main tunnel at a distance of 24.5 metres (80 ft). Further workings existed at depths of 62 m (203 ft), 47 m (154 ft) and 30 m (98 ft), each serving different purposes associated with the drifts and the guns. The 62 m workings were constructed to facilitate the removal of spoil from the drifts, while those at 47 m were connected with the handling of exhaust gases from the guns and those at 30 m gave access to the breeches of the guns. The lower levels of the workings were accessed via lift shafts, and mining cages were used during construction.

The construction work was carried out by over 5,000 workers, mostly German engineers drafted in from several companies including Mannesmann, Gute Hoffnungshütte, Krupp and the Vereinigte Stahlwerke, supplemented by 430 miners recruited from the Ruhr and Soviet prisoners of war who were used as slave labourers. The intensive Allied bombing campaign caused delays, but construction work continued nonetheless at a high pace underground. The original plans had envisaged having the first battery of five guns ready by March 1944 and the full complement of 25 guns by 1 October 1944, but these target dates were not met.

=== Air raids ===
Attacks on Mimoyecques site
Date	Notes
5 November 1943	More than 150 Martin B-26 Marauders of the USAAF Ninth Air Force bombed "construction works" at Mimoyecques, but poor visibility and bad weather caused one group to miss the primary target and numerous other aircraft to abort their attacks.
8 November 1943	No. 2 Group of the RAF Second Tactical Air Force attacked Mimoyecques with three waves each of 24 Douglas Boston medium bombers. The first two waves (24 aircraft of Nos. 88 and 342 Squadrons and 24 of Nos. 98 and 180 Squadrons) reported bursts on the railway, in the target area, and on the tunnel entrance. The third wave (19 aircraft of Nos. 226 and 305 Squadrons) reported bomb bursts near the north aiming point. Six North American Mitchells of No. 320 Squadron also attacked. In the course of the raid one Mitchell was shot down and 12 bombers were damaged by flak.
19 March 1944	173 Boeing B-17 Flying Fortresses of the Ninth Air Force 1st and 3d Bombardment Divisions, escorted by Republic P-47 Thunderbolts, bombed V-weapons sites including Mimoyecques.
26 March 1944	500 heavy bombers of the USAAF Eighth Air Force attacked a total of 16 V-weapon sites in northern France, including Mimoyecques, dropping 1,271 tons of bombs. Allied losses were four B-17s and one Consolidated B-24 Liberator; a further 236 bombers were damaged by enemy fire.
10 April 1944	Bombers of the USAAF Eighth Air Force attacked Mimoyecques.
20 April 1944	375 B-17s and 174 B-24s of the Eighth Air Force attacked V-weapon sites in the Pas-de-Calais and Cherbourg areas, for the loss of nine bombers.
27 April 1944	307 B-17s of the Eighth Air Force 1st and 3d Bombardment Division and 169 2d Bombardment Division B-24s attacked V-weapons sites in the Pas-de-Calais and Cherbourg areas, for the loss of four bombers.
28 April 1944	47 B-24s of the Eighth Air Force, escorted by 50 P-47s of the 361st Fighter Group, bombed Mimoyecques. One B-24 was lost.
1 May 1944	Over 500 Eighth Air Force heavy bombers carried out an early morning raid on V-weapon sites in northern France. Owing to bad weather only 129 heavy bombers were able to attack the V-weapon sites at Mimoyecques, Watten, and Bois de l'Enfer, and three airfields.
15 May 1944	38 of 58 B-17s of the 1st Bombardment Division bombed Mimoyecques.
21 May 1944	25 B-17s of the Eighth Air Force bombed Mimoyecques; 13 aircraft were damaged by enemy fire.
22 June 1944	234 aircraft – 119 Avro Lancasters, 102 Handley Page Halifaxes and 13 de Havilland Mosquitos – of Nos. 1, 4, 5 and 8 Groups attacked a number of V-weapon sites and stores, bombing the sites at Mimoyecques and Siracourt with the aid of Pathfinder marking.
27 June 1944	104 Halifaxes from No. 4 Group with 5 Mosquitos and 2 Lancasters of the Pathfinders attacked Mimoyecques in good weather without sustaining any losses.
6 July 1944	No. 617 Squadron RAF attacked with Tallboys. The target was marked by the squadron's commanding officer, Leonard Cheshire, from his Mustang III fighter. The bombers hit one of the shafts with a Tallboy that bored into the earth and exploded underground, leaving an enormous crater. This was Cheshire's last operation leading No. 617 Squadron, completing his 100th mission.
4 August 1944	The first Operation Aphrodite mission was flown using four radio-controlled B-17s as flying bombs. None of the targets, including Mimoyecques, were hit.
12 August 1944	An Operation Anvil drone (a modified PB4Y-1 Liberator) targeted on Mimoyecques detonated prematurely over the Blyth Estuary in Suffolk. The US Navy crew, Lieutenants Joseph P. Kennedy Jr. and Wilford J. Willy, were killed.
27 August 1944	176 Halifaxes, 40 Lancasters and 10 Mosquitos attacked Mimoyecques without loss.

== Discovery and destruction ==
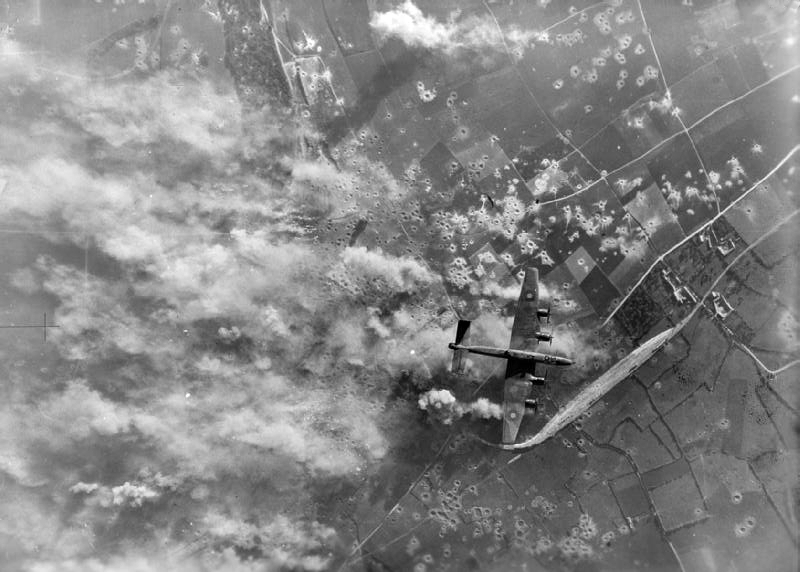
An RAF Handley Page Halifax flies over Mimoyecques on 6 July 1944 as exploding bombs send smoke and clouds of dust into the air.

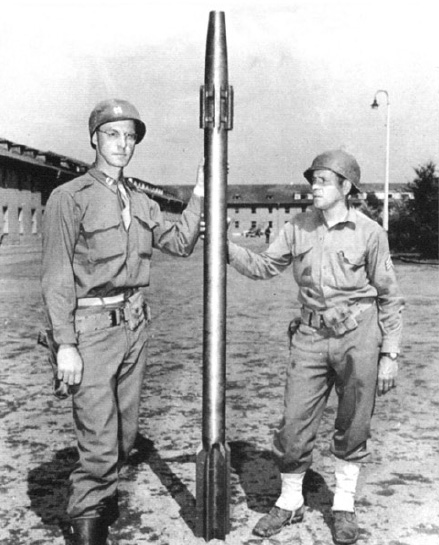
Two US Army soldiers with a captured Sprenggranate 4481 projectile, which would have been fired from the V-3 at a rate of 1 every 6 seconds.

In 1943 French agents reported that the Germans were planning to mount an offensive against the United Kingdom that would involve the use of secret weapons resembling giant mortars sunk in the ground and served by rail links. The first signs of abnormal activity at Mimoyecques were spotted by analysts at the Allied Central Interpretation Unit in September 1943, when aerial reconnaissance revealed that the Germans were building railway loops leading to the tunnels into the eastern and western sites. Further reconnaissance flights in October 1943 photographed large-scale activity around the tunnels.

An analyst named André Kenny discovered a series of shafts when he saw from a reconnaissance photograph that a haystack concealing one of them had disintegrated, perhaps through the effects of a gale, revealing the entrance, a windlass and pulley. The purpose of the site was unclear, but it was thought to be some kind of shelter for launching rockets or flying bombs. An MI6 agent reported that "a concrete chamber was to be built near one of the tunnels for the installation of a tube, 40 to 50 metres long, which he referred to as a 'rocket launching cannon'". The shafts were interpreted as "air holes to allow for the expansion of the gases released by the explosion of the launching charge."

The Allies were unaware of the HDP gun and therefore of the Mimoyecques site's true purpose. Allied intelligence believed at the time that the V-2 rocket had to be launched from tubes or "projectors", so it was assumed that the inclined shafts at Mimoyecques were intended to house such devices.

The lack of intelligence on Mimoyecques was frustrating for those involved in Crossbow operations to counter the V-weapons. On 21 March 1944 the British Chiefs of Staff discussed the shortage of intelligence but were told by Reginald Victor Jones, one of the "Crossbow Committee" members, that little information was leaking out because the workforce was predominantly German. The committee's head, Duncan Sandys, pressed for greater efforts and proposed that the Special Operations Executive be tasked to kidnap a German technician who could be interrogated for information. The suggestion was approved, but was never put into effect.

In the end the Chiefs of Staff instructed General Eisenhower to begin intensive attacks on the so-called "Heavy Crossbow" sites, including Mimoyecques, which was still believed to be intended for use as a rocket-launching site.

The Allied air forces carried out several bombing raids on Mimoyecques between November 1943 and June 1944 but caused little damage. The bombing disrupted the construction project and the initial raids of 5 and 8 November 1943 caused work to be delayed for about a month. The Germans subsequently decided to abandon the western site, where work had not progressed very far, and concentrated on the eastern site. On 6 July 1944 the Royal Air Force began bombing the site with ground-penetrating Tallboy "earthquake" bombs. One Tallboy hit the concrete slab on top of Drift IV, collapsing the drift. Three others penetrated the tunnels below and substantially damaged the facility, causing several of the galleries to collapse in places.

Around 300 Germans and forced labourers were buried alive by the collapses. Adding to the Germans' difficulties, major technical problems were discovered with the HDP gun projectiles. They had been designed to exit the barrels at a speed of about 1,500 m/s (4,900 ft/s), but the Germans found that a design fault caused the projectiles to begin "tumbling" in flight at speeds above 1,000 m/s (3,300 ft/s), causing them to fall well short of the target. This was not discovered until over 20,000 projectiles had already been manufactured.

After the devastating raid of 6 July, the Germans held a high-level meeting on the site's future at which Hitler ordered major changes to the site's development. On 12 July 1944 he signed an order instructing that only five HDP guns were to be installed in a single drift. The two other drifts were to be reused to house a pair of Krupp K5 artillery pieces, reamed out to a smooth bore with a diameter of 310 millimetres (12 in), which were to use a new type of long-range rocket-propelled shell. A pair of Rheinbote missile launchers were to be installed at the tunnel entrances. These plans were soon abandoned as Allied ground forces advanced towards Mimoyecques, and on 30 July the Organisation Todt engineers were ordered to end construction work.

The Allies were unaware of this and mounted further attacks on the site as part of the United States Army Air Forces experimental Operation Aphrodite, involving radio-controlled B-24 Liberators packed with explosives. Two such attacks were mounted but failed; in the second such attack, on 12 August, Lt Joseph P. Kennedy Jr. – the elder brother of future US President John F. Kennedy – was killed when the drone aircraft exploded prematurely. By the end of the bombing campaign, over 4,100 tons of bombs had been dropped on Mimoyecques, more than on any other V-weapons site.

The Mimoyecques site was never formally abandoned, but German forces left it at the start of September 1944 as the Allies advanced northeast from Normandy towards the Pas de Calais. It was captured on 5 September by the Canadian 3rd Infantry Division.

== Subsequent investigations and attempted demolition ==
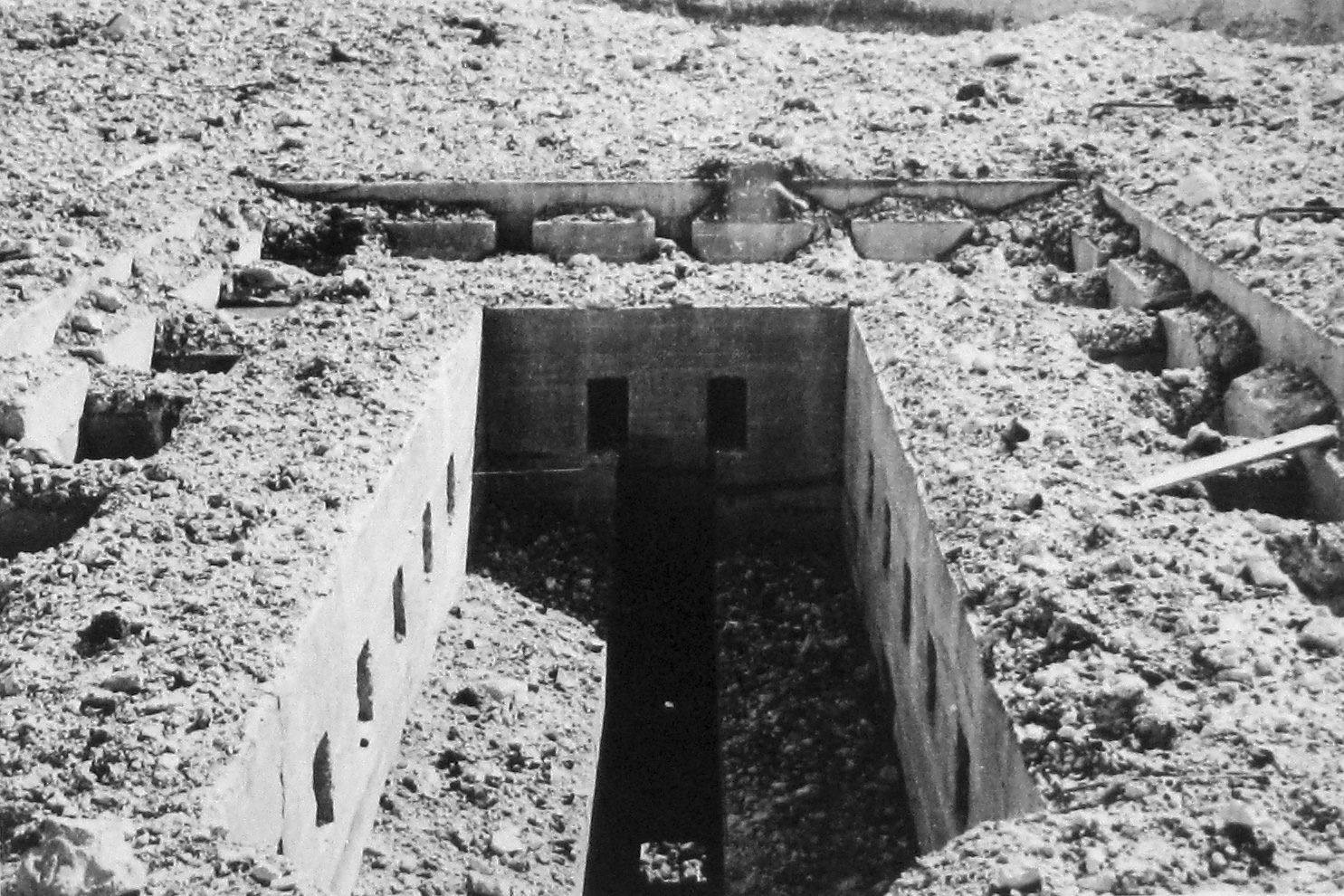
One of the concrete slabs through which the V-3 guns would have been fired. It was demolished in May 1945 by the Royal Engineers.

In September 1944, Duncan Sandys ordered the constitution of a Technical Inter-Services Mission under Colonel T.R.B. Sanders. It was given the task of investigating the V-weapons sites at Mimoyecques, Siracourt, Watten, and Wizernes, collectively known to the Allies as the "Heavy Crossbow" sites. Sanders' report was submitted to the War Cabinet on 19 March 1945.

Even at this stage the true purpose of the site was unclear. Claims that it had been intended to be used for "electro-magnetic projectors" (railguns), firing huge shells at London, were debunked by Lord Cherwell, Winston Churchill's scientific adviser, who calculated that it would take sixty times the output of Battersea Power Station to fire a one-ton shell. Sanders' investigation brought to light the V-3 project for the first time, to the alarm of the British government. He concluded that although the site had been damaged it "could be completed or adapted for offensive action against this country at some future date, and [its] destruction is a matter of importance." Sandys brought the matter to the attention of Churchill and advised: "Since this installation constitutes a potential threat to London, it would be wise to ensure that it is demolished whilst our forces are still in France." Churchill later commented that the V-3 installation at Mimoyecques "might well have launched the most devastating attack of all on London."

The discovery of the site's true purpose produced some recriminations in London, as – unlike the V-1 and V-2 projects – the V-3 had not been uncovered by Allied intelligence before the war's end. The British scientist and military intelligence expert Reginald Victor Jones later commented that "[intelligence] techniques that had been used against the flying bomb and the rocket appeared to have failed against HDP [V-3], and there had to be a reason. Basically, it was that with our limited effort we had to concentrate on the most urgent problem, and thus on catching weapons not so much at the research stage (although we sometimes achieved this) as in the development stage – which usually meant when trials were showing promise." He concluded at the time, in April 1945, that the intelligence failure had not made much practical difference given the fact that the Germans had failed to develop the HDP into an effective weapon: "there was little warning; [but] there was little danger."

Following the recommendation that the site should be destroyed, the Royal Engineers stacked ten tons of British 500 lb (230 kg) bombs and captured German plastic explosive in the tunnels at Mimoyecques and detonated them on 9 May. This failed to achieve the desired effect, and on 14 May, a further 25 tons of explosives were used to bring down the north and south entrances to the railway tunnel into the site. A subsequent investigation by the British Bombing Research Mission concluded that the entrances had been heavily blocked and that it would be a very difficult and lengthy engineering task to reinstate them. The British action was taken without informing the French beforehand and infuriated Charles de Gaulle, who considered it a violation of France's national sovereignty.

== Preservation ==
After the war, the Mimoyecques site lay abandoned. Much of the equipment left by the Germans was disposed of as scrap metal. A complete set of four steel plates, weighing 60 tons, that were intended to protect the entrances to the drifts were bought by the manager of the Hidrequent-Rixent quarries to be cut up for use in rock-crushing machinery. Rediscovered by local historians in the 1990s, they remained at the quarries until 2010, when the surviving plates were returned to Mimoyecques, where they are now on display.

The Mimoyecques site today
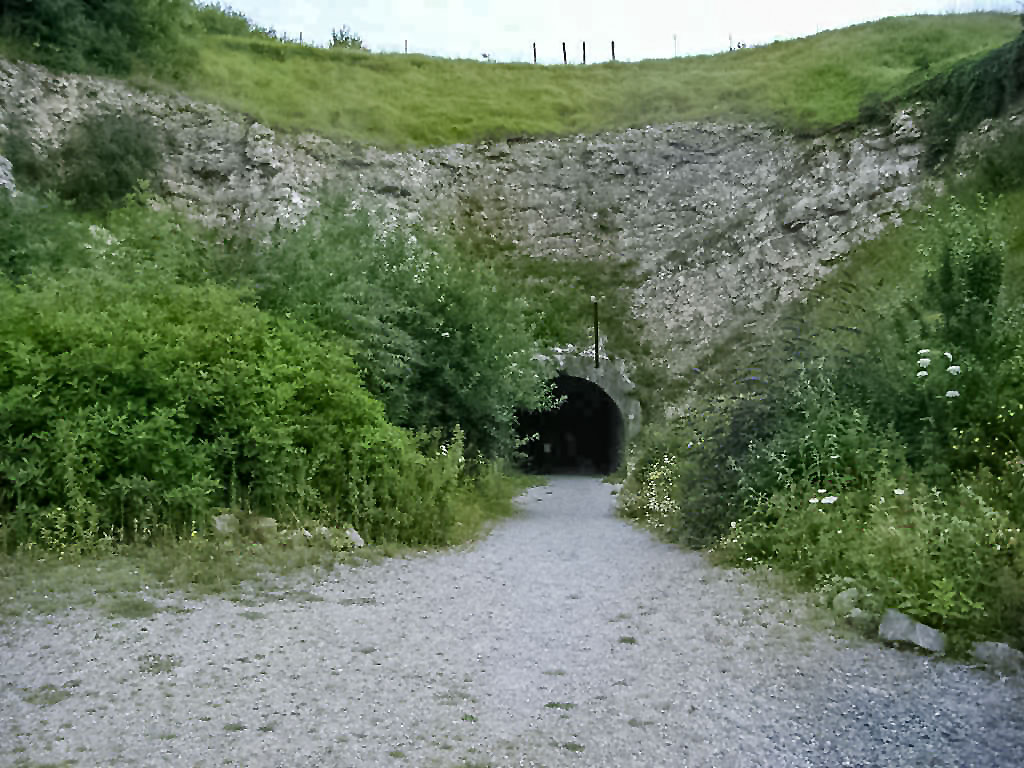
Entrance to the railway tunnel at the Mimoyecques eastern site

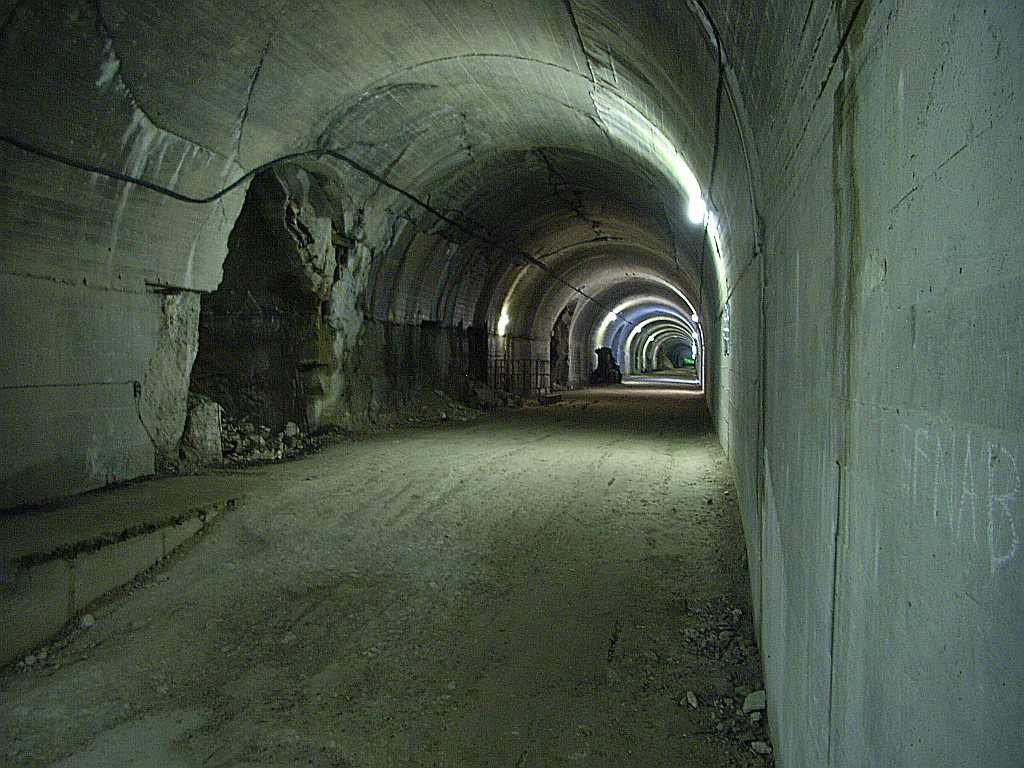
Inside the tunnel, which is now open to visitors

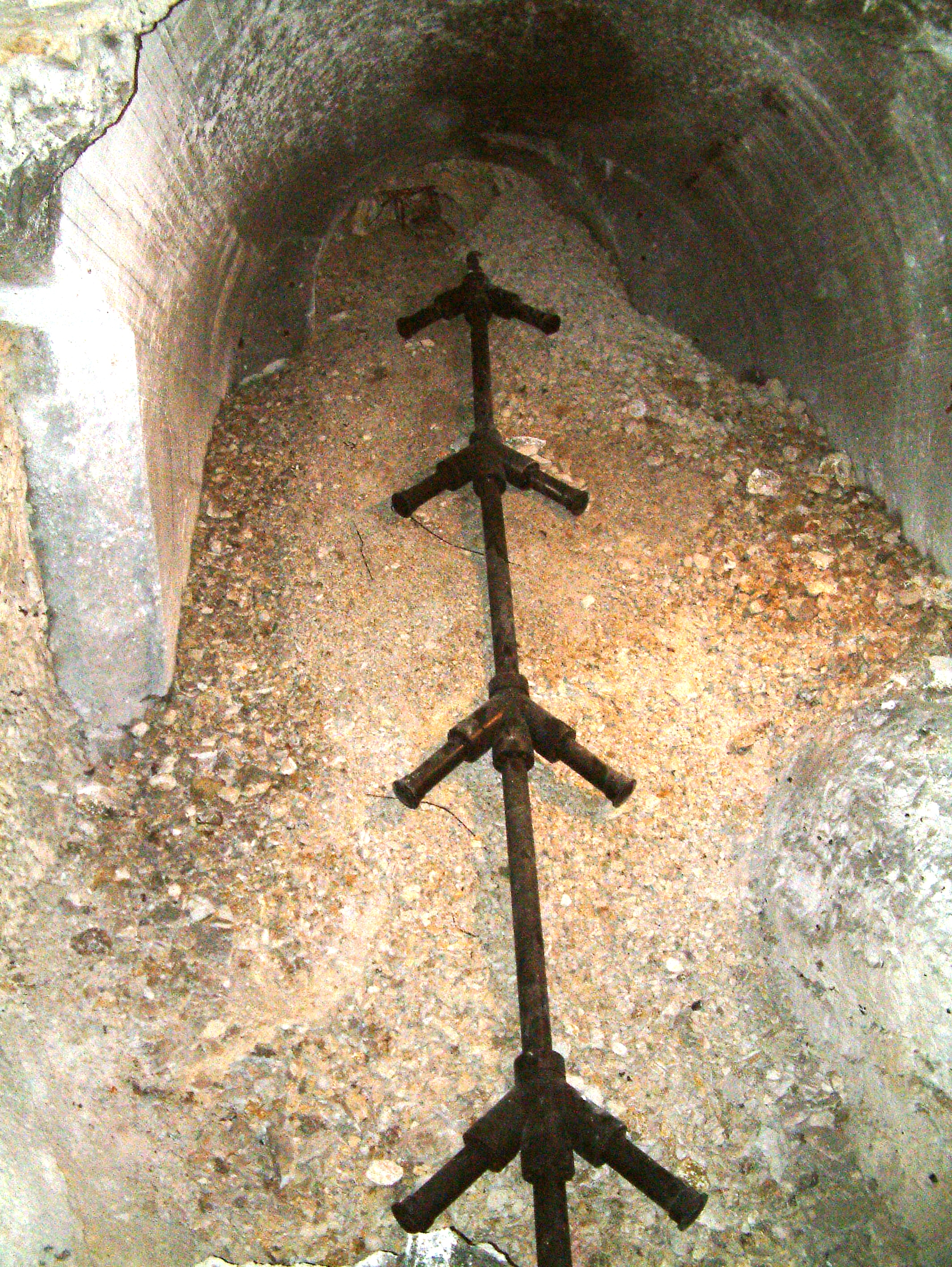
Replica of one of the Hochdruckpumpe (V-3) gun barrels in Drift IV at Mimoyecques.

Despite the closure of the railway tunnel entrances it was still possible for many years to get into the complex by climbing down one of the inclined drifts. In 1969, Marie-Madeleine Vasseur, a farmer from Landrethun, had the southern entrance excavated so that the tunnels could be used as a mushroom farm. 30 metres (98 ft) of the southern tunnel had to be removed to clear the blockage; the entrance now visible is not the original one built by the Germans. The southern entrance had been bricked up again by the 1970s. Moved to discover this forgotten construction, Vasseur, helped by family and friends, cleared the tunnels and installed an electricity supply. The société à responsabilité limitée "La Forteresse de Mimoyecques" was constituted in 1984 to operate the site as a museum under the name of Forteresse de Mimoyecques – Un Mémorial International.

The museum closed at the end of the 2008 season when the owner retired. Subsequently, the nonprofit organisation Conservatoire d'espaces naturels du Nord et Pas-de-Calais (Conservatory of natural sites of the Nord and Pas-de-Calais) purchased it at a cost of €330,000, with funding provided by the Nord-Pas-de-Calais regional council, the European Union and a private benefactor. The Conservatory's interest was due to the presence on the site of a large bat colony that included rare species, such as the Greater Horseshoe Bat, Geoffroy's Bat and the Pond Bat.

The intercommunality of the Terre des Deux Caps and the authorities in nearby Landrethun set up a partnership to operate the site under the management of the existing museum of La Coupole near Saint-Omer. The director of the latter, historian Yves le Maner, designed the contents of a new museum that was constructed at a cost of €360,000.

The site reopened to the public on 1 July 2010. As well as presenting a history of the V-weapons and of the site, the museum enables visitors to see some of the tunnels and a mock-up of the HDP gun. The tunnels also house memorials to Joseph P. Kennedy Jr., the other bomber crew members killed during raids on the site, and the forced labourers who lost their lives during construction. In 2011, the museum had about 11,000 visitors, of whom 53% were French, 18% Belgian and 16% British.

== See also ==
- Blockhaus d'Éperlecques
- La Coupole
- Project Babylon

== Bibliography ==
- Bateman, Alex (2009). No 617 'Dambusters' Sqn. Oxford: Osprey. ISBN 978-1-84603-429-9.
- Bates, Herbert Ernest (1994). Flying Bombs over England. Westerham: Froglets. ISBN 978-1-872337-04-3.
- Boelcke, Willi (1969). Deutschlands Rüstung im Zweiten Weltkrieg: Hitlers Konferenzen mit Albert Speer 1942–1945 (in German). Frankfurt am Main: Akademische Verlagsgesellschaft Athenaion.
- Carter, Kit C.; Mueller, Robert (1991). US Army Air Forces in World War II: Combat Chronology 1941–1945. Center for Air Force History. ISBN 978-1-4289-1543-5. "[citing:] Long-Range Rockets, in Plans file 8090-71; 9th AF Hist. Sec., CROSSBOW Operations Against Ski Sites, 5 December 1943–18 March 1944 (hereinafter cited as 9th AF CB Opns.); AAF Operations Against CROSSBOW and Ski Site Installations, in AC/AS, Plans file 8090-69."
- Dejonge, Étienne; Le Maner, Yves (1999). Le Nord-Pas-de-Calais dans la main allemande (in French). Lille: Le Voix du Nord. ISBN 978-2-84393-015-7.
- Hammel, Eric (2009). Air War Europa: Chronology. Pacifica, CA: Pacifica Military History. ISBN 978-0-935553-65-9.
- Henshall, Philip (2002). Hitler's V-Weapon Sites. Stroud: Strutton Publishing. ISBN 0-7509-2607-4.
- Hinsley, Francis H. (1984). British Intelligence in the Second World War: Its Influence on Strategy and Operations. Vol. 3. London: H.M.S.O. p. 380. ISBN 978-0-11-630935-8.
- Hogg, Ian V. (1999). German Secret Weapons of the Second World War. London: Greenhill Books. ISBN 978-1-85367-325-2.
- Hölsken, Dieter (1994). V-Missiles of the Third Reich, the V-1 and V-2. Monogram Aviation Publications.
- Jones, Raymond Victor (1978). The Wizard War: British Scientific Intelligence, 1939–1945. New York: Coward, McCann & Geoghegan. ISBN 9780698108967.
- Middlebrook, Mary (1991). The Somme Battlefields: a comprehensive guide from Crécy to the two world wars. London: Viking. ISBN 978-0-670-83083-1.
- Moench, John O. (1999). Marauder Men: an account of the Martin B-26 Marauder. Longwood, FL: Malia Enterprises. ISBN 978-1-877597-06-0.
- Pallud, Jean-Paul (2001). "The Secret Weapons: V3 and V4". After the Battle. 114: 2–29. ISSN 0306-154X.
- "The V-Weapons". After the Battle. 6: 23–24. 1974. ISSN 0306-154X.
- Powys-Lybbe, Ursula (1983). The eye of intelligence (1 ed.). London: Kimber. ISBN 978-0-7183-0468-3.
- Richely, Paul; Neve, André (September 1991). "Où sont les plaques cuirassées de Mimoyecques?" [Where are the armor plates of Mimoyecques?]. Bulletin d'Information du CLHAM (in French). IV (11). Centre Liégeois d'Histoire et d'Archéologie Militaires. Archived from the original on 23 August 2011. "Three times we got a permit to visit the quarry. Our original intention was to photograph the Dom Bunker and the entrance to the gun tunnel. The unexpected and emotions were at the end of the road: a motley mass of steel plates. Our guide knew nothing about it and had no objection to photography of this bizarre material. Examination of the photographs confirmed our initial hypothesis : it could be the Mimoyecques plates. (transl.)"
- Richely, Paul; Neve, André (September 1991). "Les péripéties du site d'Hydrequent-Rinxent" [The adventures of the Hydrequent-Rinxent site]. Bulletin d'Information du CLHAM (in French). IV (11). Centre Liégeois d'Histoire et d'Archéologie Militaires. Archived from the original on 11 March 2012. "The OKW refuses to renounce to the HDP gun originally planned in Mimoyecques, it will be transferred to the site Rinxent which, in turn, finds a new role at the time of abandonment. The choice of Rinxent is based on several considerations: the absence of any bombing of the site that apparently has not worried the Allies, tunnels allowing to work within with virtually ensured safety, nature of the soil (marble), location. (transl.)"
- Sanders, Terence R. B. (1945). Investigation of the "Heavy" Crossbow installations in Northern France. Report by the Sanders Mission to the Chairman of the Crossbow Committee. London: War Office.
- Sandys, Duncan (19 March 1945). Report on 'Large' Crossbow Sites in Northern France. Memo C.O.S. (45) 177 (O). London: War Office.
- Zaloga, Steven J.; Johnson, Hugh; Taylor, Chris (2008). German V-Weapon Sites 1943–45. Oxford: Osprey Publishing. ISBN 978-1-84603-247-9.
- "Le retour de pièces historiques à la forteresse de Mimoyecques" [The return of the historic pieces to the Fortress of Mimoyecques]. La Voix du Nord (in French). 15 July 2010. Archived from the original on 3 April 2012.
