= James Richard Haskell =

American inventor

- Born: September 17, 1843
- Died: August 16, 1897 (aged 53); Passaic, New Jersey

James Richard Haskell was an American inventor chiefly remembered for his invention (with Azel S. Lyman) of a multi-charge gun which was intended to increase muzzle velocity by detonating additional propellant charges behind the projectile or shell as it moved up the gun's barrel and was a distant ancestor of the World War II German V-3 "supergun".

In 1854 Haskell began experiments with steel breech-loading rifled cannon and breech-loading small-arms, manufacturing 25 of the former, which were purchased by the Mexican Government.

In 1855 he began experimenting with multi-charge guns in partnership with Azel S. Lyman, who originated the idea of applying successive charges of gunpowder to accelerate the velocity of a projectile.

== Rafael Repeater ==
In 1862, Haskell served as the sole agent for a rapid-firing machine gun he collaborated on with a Frenchman named Rafael which became known as the Rafael Repeater that was submitted to the U.S. government for trials. It was mounted on a light artillery carriage and fired standard rifle bullets. Unlike contemporary machine-guns, it did not use a feed hopper or separate cartridge chambers. However, few details remain of how it worked, apart from a mention in a letter from John Ericsson:

By a simple application of transverse reciprocating movements, exact and definite, the cartridge chamber is brought in line with the barrel, a perfectly tight joint being formed without any sliding movement across the joint of junction. Abrasion and wear are thereby prevented. The mode of filling and applying the sliding cartridge chamber is certain and free from all danger.

Rafael secured a meeting with Abraham Lincoln thanks to a letter of introduction from New York governor Edwin D. Morgan and in turn Lincoln arranged that the gun be tested by John A. Dahlgren who did so at the Navy Yard, discovering that the gun's range and accuracy were remarkable. At a range of 1,800 yd (1,600 m), the lateral deviation was described as "very slight", and "nearly all" of 16 shots fired at a target at 600 yd (550 m) were hits. As far as rate of fire went, the gun fired 40 shots in 20 seconds. John Ericsson was impressed, and wrote to Lincoln that

One regiment of intelligent men provided with one hundred of these effective weapons can most assuredly defeat and destroy a four-fold number of enemies.

The Repeater was tested in April 1863 at the 6th Corps headquarters in Virginia and was praised by a board composed of two Brigadier-Generals and a Colonel. In their report they stated that they found its simple construction, accuracy, range and rate of fire exactly as had been claimed for it and recommended that initially eight to twelve guns be used per brigade. Brigadier General Pratt, whose experience in action with the Gatling gun had not been satisfactory, endorsed the Rafael Repeater in glowing terms and asked that at least 24 of them be issued to his division.

After reading the report, Abraham Lincoln asked the Secretary of War to refer it to the Bureau of Ordnance. However, General James Wolfe Ripley, who was notorious for delaying the introduction of repeating rifles, did not buy a single example of the gun.

== Multi-charge gun ==
Haskell and Lyman reasoned that subsidiary propellant charges, spaced at intervals up the barrel of a gun in side chambers and ignited an instant after a shell had passed them, could increase the muzzle velocity of a projectile. The result, the "Lyman-Haskell multi-charge gun", which they constructed on the instructions of the US Army's Chief of Ordnance, did not resemble a conventional artillery piece; the barrel was so long that it had to be laid on an inclined ramp, and it had pairs of chambers angled back at 45 degrees let into it. It was test fired at the Frankfort Arsenal at Philadelphia in 1880 and was unsuccessful; due to faulty obturation, the flash from the original propellant charge bypassed the projectile and prematurely ignited the subsidiary charges. The best velocity that could be obtained from it was 335 metres per second (1,100 ft/s), much worse than a conventional Armstrong Gun of the same period. Lyman and Haskell abandoned the idea, though it was apparently briefly raised again in Britain during World War I.

Colonel Haskell died at his home in Passaic, New Jersey, on August 16, 1897.
