= Landrethun-le-Nord =

Landrethun-le-Nord Landerten
- Commune
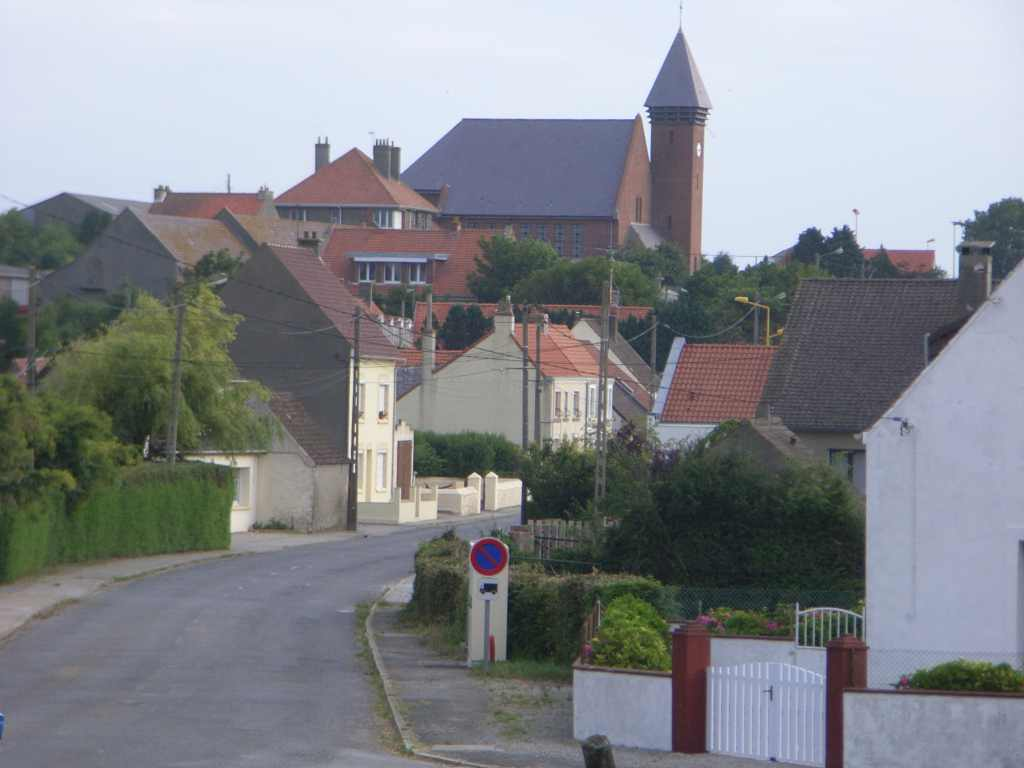
- A general view of Landrethun-le-Nord

- Coat of arms
- Location of Landrethun-le-Nord
- Location within France Location within Hauts-de-France
- Coordinates: 50°50′53″N 1°47′05″E
- Country: France
- Region: Hauts-de-France
- Department: Pas-de-Calais
- Arrondissement: Boulogne-sur-Mer
- Canton: Desvres
- Intercommunality: CC Terre des Deux Caps

Government
  - Mayor (2020–2026): Michel Delmaire
- Area^{1}: 7.7 km^{2} (3.0 sq mi)
- Elevation: 116 m (381 ft)
- Highest elevation: 133 m (436 ft)
- Lowest elevation: 57 m (187 ft)
- Population (2023): 1,242
  - Density: 160/km^{2} (420/sq mi)
- Time zone: UTC+01:00 (CET)
  - Summer (DST): UTC+02:00 (CEST)
- INSEE/Postal code: 62487 /62250
- ^{1} French Land Register data, which excludes lakes, ponds, glaciers > 1 km^{2} (0.386 sq mi or 247 acres) and river estuaries.

Landrethun-le-Nord (French pronunciation: [lɑ̃dʁətœ̃ lə nɔʁ]; West Flemish: Landerten) is a commune in the Pas-de-Calais department in the Hauts-de-France region of France about 13 miles (21 km) northeast of Boulogne.

== Population ==
Historical population
| Year | Pop. | ±% p.a. |
|---|---|---|
| 1968 | 625 | — |
| 1975 | 744 | +2.52% |
| 1982 | 707 | −0.73% |
| 1990 | 853 | +2.37% |
| 1999 | 906 | +0.67% |
| 2007 | 1,118 | +2.66% |
| 2012 | 1,237 | +2.04% |
| 2017 | 1,299 | +0.98% |
| 2023 | 1,242 | −0.75% |
Source: INSEE

== Places of interest ==
- The Second World War Fortress of Mimoyecques.

== See also ==
- Communes of the Pas-de-Calais department
