= V-3 cannon =

German World War II large-caliber artillery

Coordinates: 50°51′15″N 1°45′30″E

Hochdruckpumpe ("high-pressure-pump")
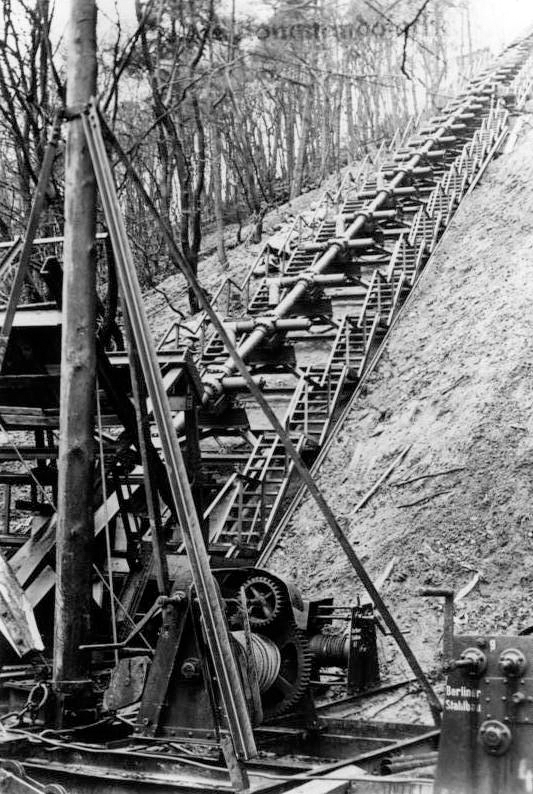
- The prototype V-3 cannon at Laatzig, Germany (now Zalesie, Poland) in 1942.
- Type: Large-caliber artillery
- Place of origin: Germany

Service history
- In service: 1944–1945
- Used by: Germany
- Wars: World War II

Production history
- Manufacturer: Krupp

Specifications
- Length: 130 m (430 ft)
- Shell: 140 kilograms (310 lb)
- Caliber: 150 millimetres (5.9 in)
- Elevation: fixed
- Traverse: fixed
- Rate of fire: 0.2 rpm (projected)
- Muzzle velocity: 1,500 metres per second (4,900 ft/s)
- Maximum firing range: 165 km (103 miles)

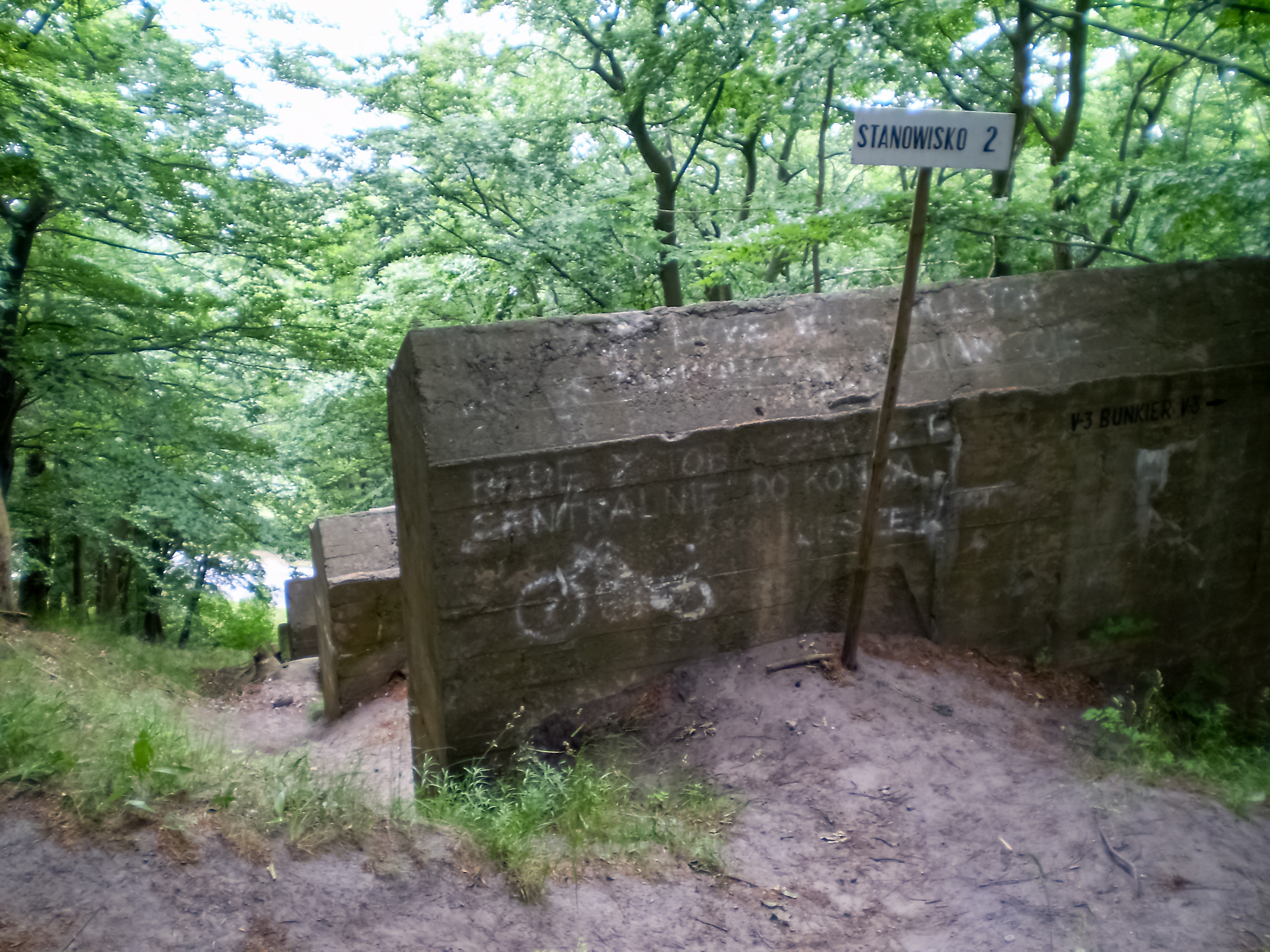
Remains of V-3 in Zalesie near Międzyzdroje, Wolin Island, Poland (2008)

The V-3 (German: Vergeltungswaffe 3, lit. 'Vengeance Weapon 3') was a German World War II large-caliber gun working on the multi-charge principle whereby secondary propellant charges are fired to add velocity to a projectile. Two full-size guns were built in the underground Fortress of Mimoyecques in northern France and permanently aimed at London, but they were rendered unusable by Allied bombing raids before completion. Two smaller guns were used to bombard Luxembourg from December 1944 to February 1945.

The V-3 was also known as the Hochdruckpumpe ("High Pressure Pump", HDP for short), which was a code name intended to hide the real purpose of the project. It was also known as Fleißiges Lieschen ("Busy Lizzie").

== Description ==
The gun used multiple propellant stages placed along the barrel's length in order to provide an additional boost. These were ignited by the hot gases that propelled the projectile as it passed them. Solid-fuel rocket boosters were used instead of explosive charges because of their greater suitability and ease of use. These were arranged in symmetrical pairs along the length of the barrel, angled to project their thrust against the base of the projectile as it passed. This layout spawned the German codename Tausendfüßler ("millipede").

The barrel and side chambers were designed as identical sections to simplify production and allow damaged sections to be replaced. The entire gun would use multiple such sections bolted together. The smoothbore gun fired a fin-stabilized shell that depended upon aerodynamic forces rather than gyroscopic forces to prevent tumbling (as distinct from conventional rifled weapons which cause the projectile to spin).

== Background ==
The basic idea of the multi-charge concept is that in a traditional single-charge gun the pressure in the barrel is at its peak when the charge is fired, and then continuously dwindles to some much lower value as the projectile travels down the barrel and the combustion gasses expand. This requires a traditional gun to be much heavier at the breech end in order to successfully contain this pressure, and as the gun grows in power, the weight becomes untenable. The multi-charge concept uses a low-power initial charge and continues adding more charges as the shell moves along the barrel, resulting in a much more constant pressure as the shell moves. This reduces peak pressure and the need to have a heavy breech, as well as providing smoother acceleration.

The origin of the multi-chamber gun dates back to the 19th century. In 1857, U.S. inventor Azel Storrs Lyman (1815–1885) was granted a patent on "Improvement in accelerating fire-arms", and he built a prototype in 1860 which proved to be unsuccessful. Lyman then modified the design in collaboration with James Richard Haskell, who had been working for years on the same principle.

Haskell and Lyman reasoned that subsidiary propellant charges could increase the muzzle velocity of a projectile if the charges were spaced at intervals along the barrel of a gun in side chambers and ignited an instant after a shell had passed them. The "Lyman-Haskell multi-charge gun" was constructed on the instructions of the U.S. Army's Chief of Ordnance, but it did not resemble a conventional artillery piece. The barrel was so long that it had to be placed on an inclined ramp, and it had pairs of chambers angled back at 45 degrees discharging into it.

It was test-fired at the Frankford Arsenal at Philadelphia in 1880 and was unsuccessful. The flash from the original propellant charge bypassed the projectile due to faulty obturation and prematurely ignited the subsidiary charges before the shell passed them, slowing the shell down. The best velocity that could be obtained from it was 335 metres per second (1,100 ft/s), inferior to the performance of a conventional RBL 7 inch Armstrong gun of the same period. New prototypes of multi-charge guns were built and tested, but Lyman and Haskell abandoned the idea.

19th century multi-chamber guns that inspired the V-3 cannon of Mimoyecques
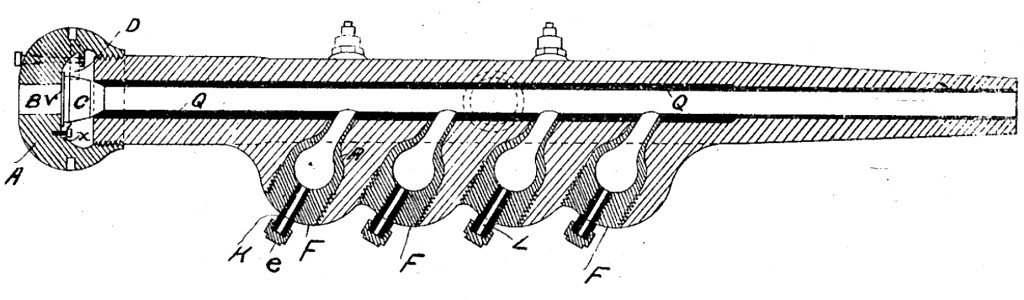
Accelerating gun (1881) by James Richard Haskell

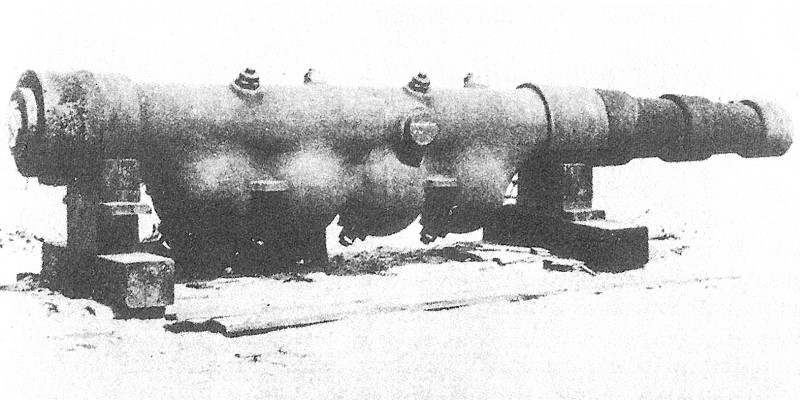
Accelerating gun by Lyman and Haskell (1883).

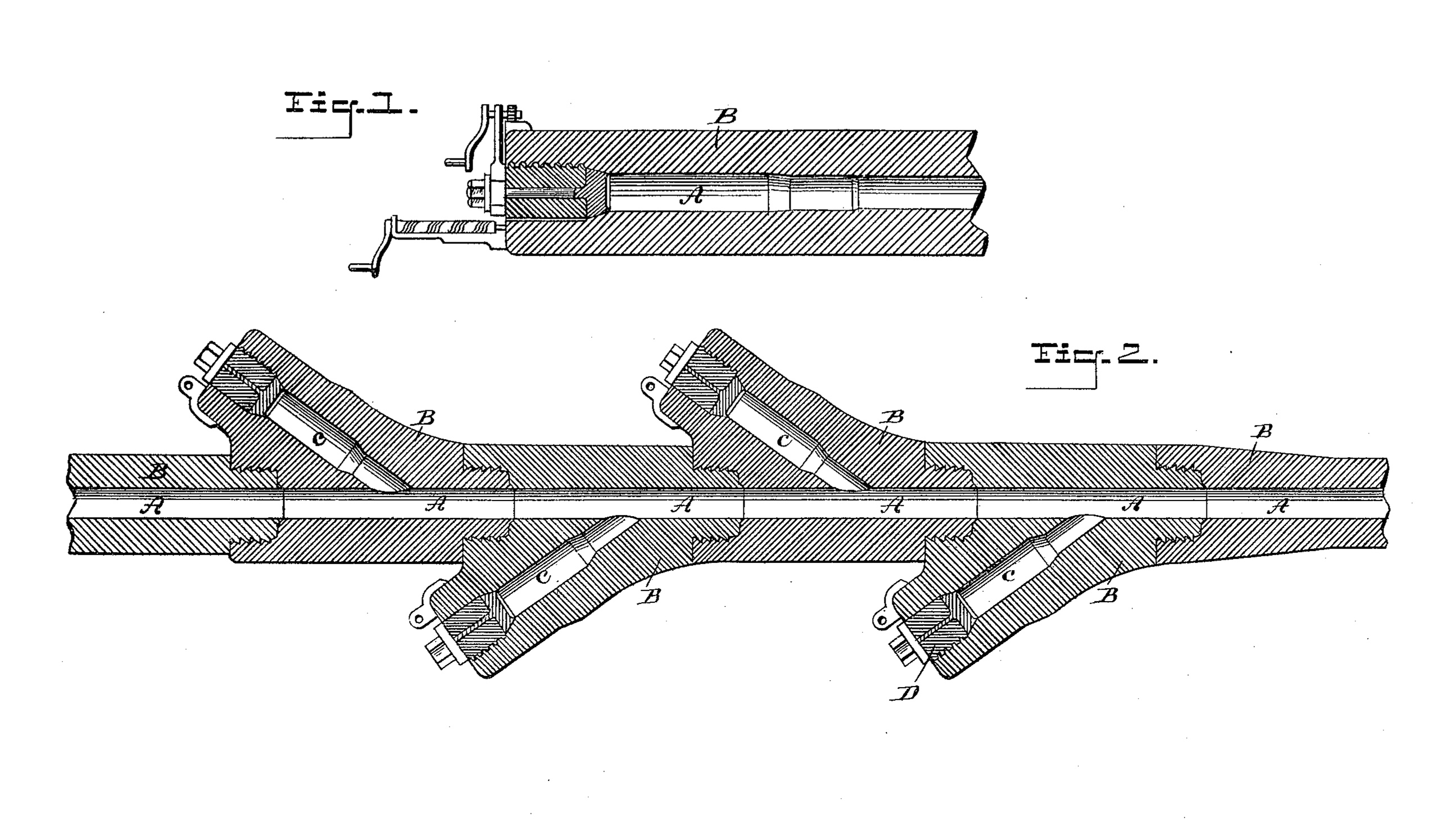
Multi-charge cannon by Haskell (1892).

During the same period, French engineer Louis-Guillaume Perreaux, one of the pioneers of the motorcycle, had been working on a similar project since before 1860. Perreaux was granted a patent in 1864 for a multi-chamber gun. In 1878, Perreaux presented his invention at the World Exhibition of Paris.

== Development ==
In 1918, the French Army made plans for a very long range multi-chamber gun in response to the German Paris Gun. The Paris Gun was built by Friedrich Krupp AG and could bombard Paris from German lines over a distance of 125 kilometres (78 mi). The French initiative did not reach the prototype stage. It was discontinued and the plans archived when the retreat of the German armies and the armistice put an end to the bombardment.

France collapsed in June 1940 at the beginning of World War II, and German troops acquired the plans of this long-range gun. In 1942, this patent attracted the attention of August Coenders, (Note: August Cönders is often incorrectly considered the inventor of the multi-chamber gun.) developer of the Röchling shell and chief engineer of the plants "Röchling Stahlwerk AG" in Wetzlar, Germany. Coenders thought that the gradual acceleration of the shell by a series of small charges spread over the length of the barrel might be the solution to the problem of designing very long range guns. The very strong explosive charge needed to project shells at a high speed was causing rapid degradation of the gun tubes of conventional guns. (Note: For example, in 1918, the tube of the Paris Gun needed to be changed after only 65 shots. Moreover, the shells had to be made in progressively larger diameter to compensate for wear of the tube, and were numbered from 1 to 65 to be used in the correct order. (Pallud 2003))

Coenders proposed the use of electrically activated charges to eliminate the problem of the premature ignition of the subsidiary charges as experienced by the Lyman-Haskell gun. Coenders built a prototype of a 20 mm multi-chamber gun using machinery readily available at the Wetzlar plant to produce tubes of this calibre for the Flak 38 anti-aircraft guns of 20 mm. The first tests were encouraging, but to get the support of the Ministry of arms, Hermann Röchling had to present to Albert Speer Coenders' project of a cannon capable of firing on London from the coast of the Pas-de-Calais. The project intended to use two batteries to crush London under a barrage of hundreds of 140-kilogram (310 lb) shells per hour with an explosive charge of 25 kilograms (55 lb).

Speer told Adolf Hitler about the proposal in May 1943. After the Royal Air Force (RAF) bombed the Peenemünde rocket center on 17 August, Hitler agreed to Speer's suggestion that the gun be built without more tests. Coenders constructed a full-calibre gun at the Hillersleben proving ground near Magdeburg but, by the end of 1943, he had encountered severe problems both in putting the gun's basic principle into operation and in producing a feasible design for the shells that it was to fire. Even when everything worked, the muzzle velocity was just over 1,000 metres per second (3,300 ft/s), which was nowhere near what had been promised. Nonetheless, a proposal was made to build a single full-sized gun with a 150-metre (490 ft) barrel at Misdroy on the Baltic island of Wolin, near Peenemünde, while construction went ahead at the Mimoyecques site in France, which had already been attacked by the USAAF and the RAF. The Heereswaffenamt (Weapon Procurement Office) took control of the project by March 1944, and, with no good news from Misdroy, Coenders became one of the engineers working on the three chief problems: projectile design, obturation, and ignition of the secondary charges.

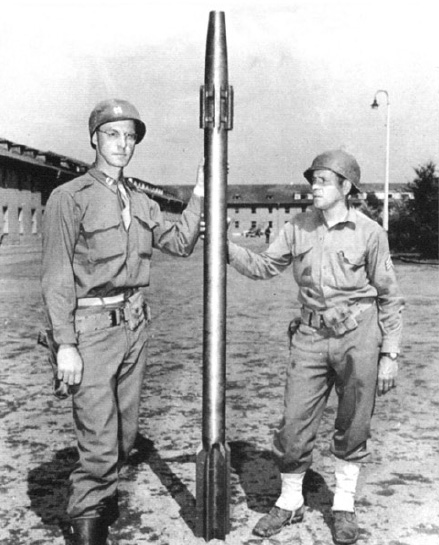
Two US Army soldiers with a captured Sprenggranate 4481 projectile, which would have been fired from the V-3 at a rate of one every 6 seconds.

Six different companies produced satisfactory designs for projectiles, including Krupp and Škoda Works. Obturation problems were solved by placing a sealing piston between the projectile and the initial propellant charge, which prevented the flash from the charge from getting ahead of the projectile, and solved the problem of controlling the initiation of the secondary charges. By the end of May 1944 there were four designs for the 150 mm finned projectile, one manufactured by Fasterstoff (designed by Füstenberg) and three others by Röchling (Coenders), Bochumer (Verein-Haack), and Witkowitz Ironworks (Athem).

Trials were held at Misdroy from 20–24 May 1944 with ranges of up to 88 km (55 mi) being attained. On 4 July 1944, the Misdroy gun was test-fired with 8 rounds; one of the 1.8 m (5.9 ft) long shells travelled 93 km (58 mi). The gun burst during the testing, putting an end to the tests.

== Mimoyecques site ==
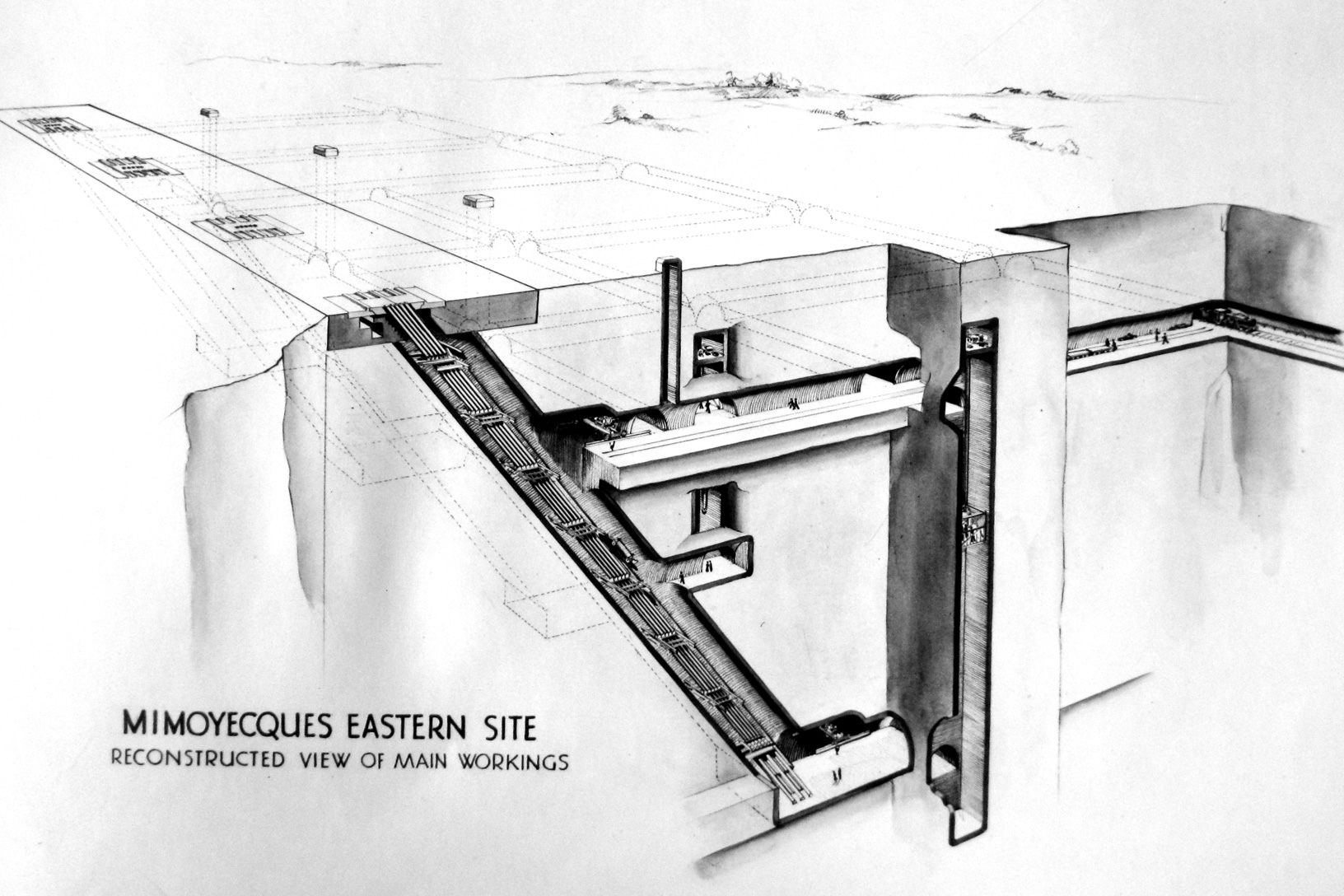
Reconstructed plan of the site

Major Bock of Festung Pioneer-Stab 27 (the fortification regiment of LVII Corps, Fifteenth Army, at the time based in the Dieppe area) was given the task of finding a suitable site for the HDP batteries following Hitler's decision that HDP guns should be sited in northern France to bombard London. A study in early 1943 concluded that a hill with a rock core would be most suitable, as the gun tubes could be placed in drifts (inclined tunnels) and support equipment and supplies located in adjacent tunnels. The guns would not be movable and would be permanently aimed at London.

A suitable site was selected at a limestone hill about 5 kilometres (3.1 mi) north of the Hidrequent quarries, near Mimoyecques in the Pas-de-Calais region of northern France behind Cap Gris Nez, where V-1 and V-2 launch sites were already under construction. The site was 8 kilometres (5.0 mi) from the sea and 165 kilometres (103 mi) from London. It was code-named Wiese (meadow) and Bauvorhaben 711 (Construction Project 711), and Organisation Todt began construction in September 1943 with the building of railway lines to support the work, and began to excavate the gun shafts in October. The initial layout comprised two parallel facilities about 1 kilometre (0.62 mi) apart, each with five drifts which were to hold a stacked cluster of five HDP gun tubes, for a total of 50 guns. Both facilities were served by an underground railway tunnel and underground ammunition storage galleries.

The eastern complex consisted of five drifts angled at 50 degrees reaching 105 metres (344 ft) below the hilltop. The five drifts exited the hilltop through a concrete slab 30 metres (98 ft) wide and 5.5 metres (18 ft) thick. Large steel plates protected the five openings, and each drift had a special armoured door. Extensive tunnels and elevator shafts supported the guns and, if the site had become operational, about 1,000 troops from Artillerie Abteilung 705 and supporting units would have been deployed at Mimoyecques. Artillerie Abteilung 705 had been organised in January 1944 under Oberstleutnant Georg Borttscheller to operate the Wiese gun complex.

The plans were to have the first battery of five gun tubes ready for March 1944, and the full complex of 25 gun tubes by 1 October 1944. A failure occurred at the Misdroy proving ground in April 1944 after only 25 rounds had been fired and, as a result, the project was further cut back from five drifts to three, although work had begun on some of the other drifts.

The site was finally put out of commission on 6 July 1944, when bombers of RAF Bomber Command's 617 Squadron (the famous "Dambusters") attacked using 5,400-kilogram (11,900 lb) "Tallboy" deep-penetration "earthquake" bombs.

== Luxembourg bombardment ==
The project eventually came under the control of the SS, and SS General Hans Kammler ordered it to be ready for action in late 1944, assisted by Walter Dornberger. A battery was constructed of two shorter or "half-barrel" V-3 guns approximately 50 metres (160 ft) long with 12 side-chambers, and it was placed in the hands of the army artillery unit Artillerie Abteilung 705 under the command of Hauptmann (Captain) Patzig. These were sited in a wooded ravine of the Ruwer River at Lampaden about 13 kilometres (8.1 mi) southeast of Trier in Germany.

The two guns were aimed west, resting on 13 steel support structures on solid wooden bases on a 34 degree slope. The city of Luxembourg (which had been liberated in September 1944) was at a range of about 43 kilometres (27 mi) and was designated Target No. 305. Concrete blockhouses were constructed between the two gun tubes, as well as ten smaller bunkers to hold projectiles and propellant charges.

The assembly and mounting of the Lampaden guns coincided with the final preparations for the Battle of the Bulge. The supply of ammunition became problematic due to the state of the German railway network. Time had become critical, and it was decided to use a 150-millimetre (5.9 in) finned projectile with a discarding sabot, weighing 95 kilograms (209 lb) and carrying a 7–9 kg (15–20 lb) explosive charge. The propellant comprised a 5 kg (11 lb) main charge and 24 subsidiary charges for a total of 73 kg (161 lb).

Following the commencement of the Ardennes Offensive on 16 December 1944, Hans Kammler received directives from OB West to initiate fire missions by the end of the month. The primary gun tube achieved operational readiness on 30 December 1944. Initial deployment consisted of two warm-up rounds followed by a sequence of five high-explosive shells, an event personally overseen by Kammler. The projectiles attained a muzzle velocity of approximately 935 m/s.

A second gun tube was commissioned on 11 January 1945. Between late December and 22 February 1945, a total of 183 rounds were discharged. Of these, 142 rounds struck Luxembourg, resulting in 44 confirmed hits within the urban sector. The bombardment caused 10 fatalities and 35 injuries.

== Fate ==
One of the two Lampaden guns was dismantled on 15 February 1945, and firing ceased on 22 February, when US Army units had advanced to within 3 kilometres (1.9 mi) of the Lampaden site.

A second battery of guns began to be deployed in January 1945 at Buhl, aimed at Belfort in support of the Operation Nordwind offensive. One gun was erected before the failure of the Nordwind offensive put the site at risk, and the equipment was removed before firing could begin.

There were other proposals to deploy batteries to bombard London, Paris, Antwerp and other cities, but they were not implemented due to the poor state of the German railway network and a lack of ammunition. All four HDP guns were eventually abandoned at the Röchling works in Wetzlar and Artillerie Abteilung 705 was re-equipped with conventional artillery. The disassembled gun tubes, spare parts, and remaining ammunition were later captured by the US Army and shipped to the United States where they were tested and evaluated at the Aberdeen Proving Ground, Maryland, and scrapped there in 1948.

== Museum ==
The Mimoyecques museum provides public access to the underground galleries, which exhibit varying degrees of structural completion and historical bombardment damage. The site’s holdings include the remains of the original ordnance, a small-scale replica of the V-3 weapon system and authentic examples of the machinery, rail infrastructure, and tools utilized during the facility's operation. The site also contains memorials to the slave labourers who were forced by the Nazis to construct it and to the airmen killed in action during the destruction of the base.

The Misdroy site also has a museum.

== Scale model ==
Hugh Hunt of Cambridge University, together with explosives engineer Charlie Adcock, created a working scale model of the V-3 gun and was able to prove the ignition of the propellants was done by the advancing gas behind the projectile.

== See also ==
- Cross-Channel guns in the Second World War
- Project Babylon
- Project HARP
- Railgun

== References and notes ==
Notes

Citations

Bibliography

- Henshall, Philip (1985). Hitler's Rocket Sites. Philip Hale. ISBN 0-7090-2021-X.
- Irving, David (1964). The Mare's Nest (PDF). London: William Kimber and Co. ISBN 978-1-872197-22-7. Archived from the original (PDF) on 13 May 2015.
- Wood, Paul; Ford, Roger (2000). Germany's Secret Weapons in World War II. Zenith Imprint. pp. 117–19. ISBN 0-7603-0847-0.
- Zaloga, Steven J.; Johnson, Hugh; Taylor, Chris (2008). German V-Weapon Sites 1943-45. Oxford: Osprey Publishing. ISBN 978-1-84603-247-9.
- Ginisty, Paul (2 March 1884). "Un nouveau cannon" [A new cannon]. L'Actualité militaire illustrée (in French) (6). "Ce canon fût présenté (...) en 1860"
- L'artillerie à l'exposition de 1878. Paris: Berger-Levrault. 1879.
- Birnie, Rogers (1907). "The multicharge gun". Gun making in the United States. Washington: Government printing office.
- Haskell, James Richard (1907). "Discussion". In Birnie, Rogers (ed.). Gun making in the United States. Washington: Government printing office. pp. 121–124.
- "The Lyman Accelerator Gun". Van Nostrand's eclectic engineering magazine. Vol. 3. D. Van Nostrand. 1870. pp. 658–659. "Some time back we referred to the construction of the gun known as the accelerator in which a series of chambers were arranged at the side of the bore for containing charges of powder which exploded in succession as the projectile moved along it towards the muzzle until the combination of the charges exerted their full force upon the base of the shot to throw or propel it. The gun tried was of small calibre about 4 inches (100 mm) in diameter and this succeeded beyond the expectations of the company who were present to witness the trial. The success of the small one led the gentlemen interested in its production for field or battery purposes to endeavor to have one of a large size cast. Of course many difficulties had to be overcome before they could venture to make the world acquainted with the fact that a large one was in hand but after several failures mainly due to unforeseen circumstances they have had one cast weighing 10,175 pounds (4,615 kg) and measuring 11 feet 6 inches (3.51 m) in length. This gun was tried in the United States a few miles below Reading Pennsylvania on the old proving ground."
- Bull, Stephen (2004). "V3". Encyclopedia of military technology and innovation. Westport, Conn: Greenwood Press. p. 282. ISBN 978-1-57356-557-8.
- "Warfare's new weapon; casting the first of Lyman-Haskell cannon" (PDF). The New York Times. 25 October 1881. "The first large cannon constructed on the accelerating or multi-charge principle and to be known as the Lyman-Haskell gun was casted today at the foundry of the Reading Iron Works."
- Lyman Holley, Alexander (1865). A treatise on ordnance and armor. D. Van Mostrand. pp. 885–886.
- Porezag, Karsten (1997). Geheime Kommandosache: Geschichte Der "V-Waffen" Und Geheimen Militaraktionen Des Zweiten Weltkrieges an Lahn, Dill Und Im Westerwald. Verlag Wetzlardruck. ISBN 3-926617-20-9.
- United States Army — Ordnance Dept (1884). Report of the Chief of Ordnance to the Secretary of War. Government Press Office.
- Pallud, Jean-Paul (2003). "Le Bunker de Mimoyecques — Hochdrukpumpe". 39/45 Magazine (in French). 197: 44–57. ISSN 0761-7348.
- Hogg, Ian V. (2002). German artillery of World War II. London: Greenhill. ISBN 185367480X.
