= List of air operations during the Battle of Europe =

Airborne warfare in World War II

External images
- 1939 · 1940 · 1941 · 1942 · 1943 · 1944 · 1945

Symbol key
Symbol	Air force
	German Luftwaffe
	German OKW V-2 forces
	Polish Air Force
	French Air Force
	United Kingdom Royal Air Force
	Italian Regia Aeronautica
	Soviet Union Red Army Air Force
(1918–1945)	Finnish Air Force
	Royal Canadian Air Force
	Romanian Air Force
(1942–1945)	Royal Hungarian Air Force
	United States Army Air Forces
	United States Artillery Observers
(1941–1944)	Royal Bulgarian Air Force

This World War II timeline of European Air Operations lists notable military events in the skies of the European Theater of Operations of World War II from the Invasion of Poland to Victory in Europe Day. The list includes combined arms operations, defensive anti-aircraft warfare, and encompasses areas within the territorial waters of belligerent European states. (Note: Air offensive or defensive operations does not include cargo operations such as Operation Carpetbagger or reconnaissance from air.)

1939 1940 1941 1942 1943 1944 1945

== 1939 ==
1 September: At 4:40am the Luftwaffe starts World War II with the terror bombing of the Polish city of Wieluń. At 8:00am German ground forces cross the Polish border launching the invasion of Poland.

1 September: The Luftwaffe begins Operation Wasserkante, the first air attacks against Warsaw, as part of the invasion of Poland.

2 September: Single PZL.23B of the 21st Bomber Squadron of Polish Military Aviation bombs a factory in Ohlau. The attack represented the first Allied bombing raid to be conducted against a target in territory within the Third Reich.

3 September: Flying officer Andrew McPherson is the first Royal Air Force pilot to cross the German coast after the United Kingdom declared war on Nazi Germany. Flying a Bristol Blenheim from 139 Squadron, his mission is to identify German maritime targets around Wilhelmshaven.

3 September: The RAF launches its first raid of the war over Germany territory. Eighteen Handley Page Hampdens and nine Vickers Wellingtons are sent to attack the German warships moored at the Wilhelmshaven naval base. However poor visibility prevents the bombers from finding any targets before nightfall so they return.

4 September: The RAF launches another bombing operation against German shipping. Fourteen Wellingtons from 9 and 149 Squadrons attack Brunsbuttel and 15 Bristol Blenheims from 107 and 110 Squadrons raid Wilhelmshaven bay. Five Blenheims and three Vickers Wellingtons are shot down through a combination of Messerschmitt Bf 109s and flak. They become the first British aircraft losses on the Western Front. Among those killed was pilot Flying Officer Brian Lightoller, the youngest son of Titanic survivor Charles Lightoller.

4 September: The first British airman to be taken prisoner was Sergeant George Booth, a RAF Observer from 107 Squadron. He was captured after his Bristol Blenheim was shot down over the German coast.

13 September: The Bombing of Frampol was the war's first area bombardment

20 September: The first recorded RAF "kill" of the Second World War is the shooting down of a Messerschmitt Bf 109 by air observer Sergeant F Letchford aboard a Fairey Battle flown by Flying Officer LH Baker from 88 Squadron.

20 September: The first recorded kill of the French Armee de l'Air is credited to Sergeant André-Armand Legrand, flying a Curtis H75A-1 in the Groupe de Chasse II/5 La Fayette, for downing a Messerschmitt Bf 109E of the Luftwaffe 3/JG 53 over Überherrn.

27 September: The Luftwaffe ceases its bombing campaign against Warsaw after its Polish garrison surrenders to German forces. Approximately 1,150 sorties were flown by a wide variety of aircraft, including obsolete Junkers Ju 52/3m bombers.

30 November: The Winter War between Soviet Union and Finland starts. Three hours after the Red Army had crossed the border and started the Winter War, Helsinki is bombed. Throughout the war, the Soviet Air Force has the air superiority and several cities in Finland are targeted.

18 December: The first use of radar for defence (an "experimental Freya radar") gave warning of RAF bombers near the German Bight as they made an attack on Wilhelmshaven. However the German fighters were not permitted to intercept until visual confirmation was made - the bombers were attacked after they had dropped their bombs.

== 1940 ==
21 April: A bombing raid on Norway kills the first American military officer killed in World War II.

13 May: Luftflotte 3 (supported by Luftflotte 2) in the Battle of France executed the heaviest air bombardment to date (300 sorties)--the most intense by World War II Luftwaffe.

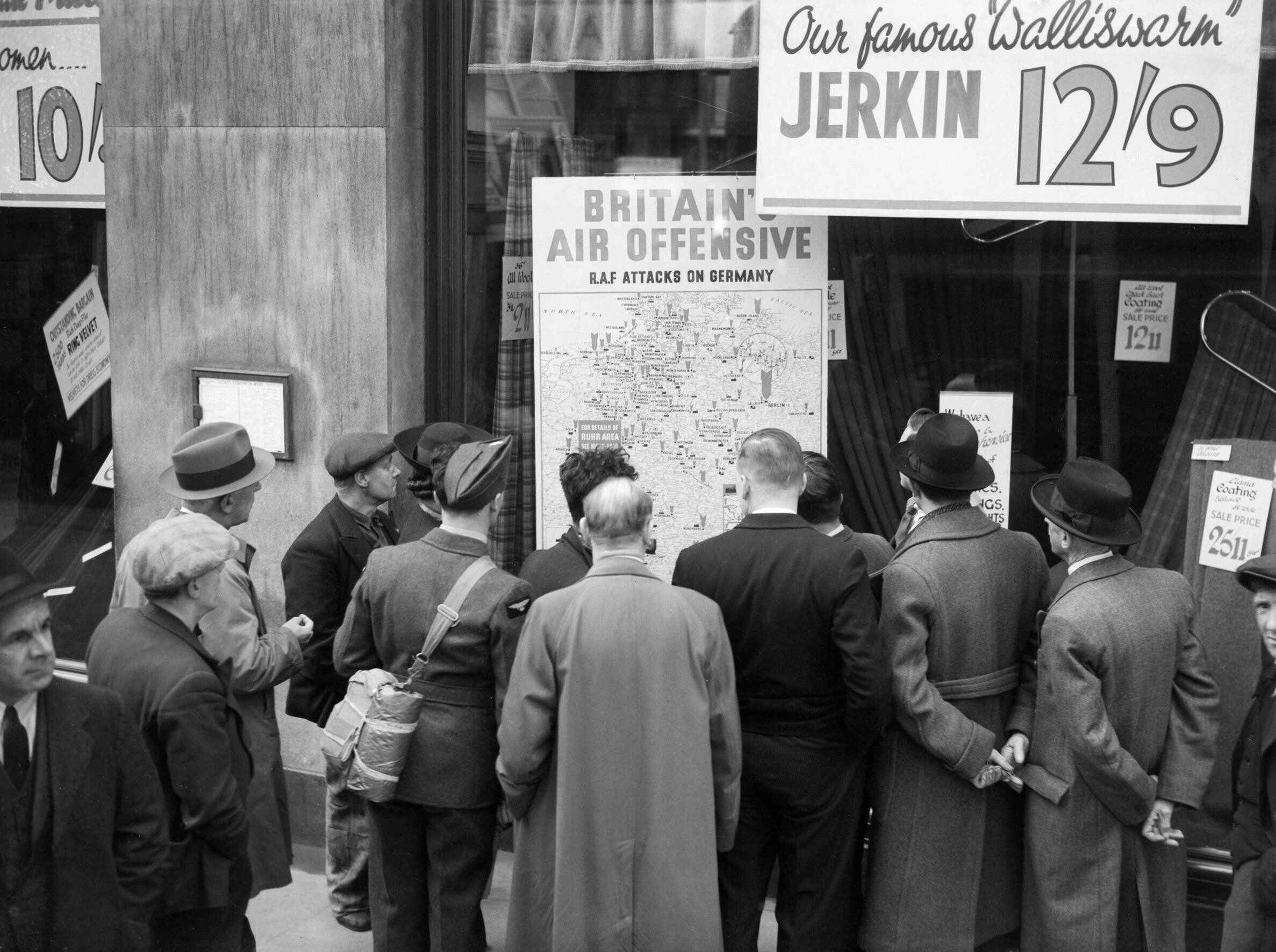
People in London look at a map illustrating how the RAF is striking back at Germany during 1940

14 May: Under cover of Adolf Galland's air wing and after dummy paratroopers were airdropped (imitating battle noises after landing), Fort Eben-Emael was taken by glider troops during the Battle of Belgium.

14 May: The Rotterdam Blitz ended the Battle of the Netherlands

15 May: A kill shared by French pilot René Mouchotte and Englishman Jack Charles becomes the 1,000th victim of RAF Biggin Hill fighters--Vickers threw a "fabulous party"

15 May: The RAF lost the 100th of its France-based bombers. In 72 hours, it had lost half of its offensive force.

15/16 May: In the first large-scale World War II strategic bombing and the first attack on the German "backcountry", just 24 of 96 dispatched bombers found the Ruhr Area power stations and refineries.

19 May: French fighters strafed advanced columns of Operation Abendsegen

27 May 1940: Heinkels bombarded the Dunkirk perimeter followed by Stukas and Dorniers: opposition included the "first major encounter" by Spitfires of No. 74 Squadron RAF.

27/28 May: A No. 10 Squadron RAF Armstrong Whitworth Whitley tail gunner was the first in the RAF to down a German fighter.

2 June: Robert Stanford Tuck led a wing of Spitfires from RAF Martlesham Heath, the first "big formation" of the war, against eight Heinkel He IIIs and about 25 Messerschmitt Bf 109s over the Calais area.

3 June: Operation Paula was Nazi Germany's "single attempt at strategic air warfare during the French campaign."

7-8 June: French Air Force raid is the first air raid against Berlin.

9 June: Germany attains air supremacy in the Battle of France

June 11/12: First British bombing of Italy with a raid on Turin.

26 June: The RAF Advanced Air Striking Force disbanded after beginning operations in France in May

24 July: Ferrying of Luftwaffe aircraft to the Channel Coast ended the first phase of the Battle of Britain

9 August: The Birmingham Blitz began and (along with Hull Blitz) became the basis for the RAF dehousing bombing policy in 1942.

25 August: First RAF raid on Berlin

7 September: The Blitz bombing of Britain began with 57 nights of air raids

8 September: Three Dornier Do 17 bombers are downed by a single shot from a "Territorial gun crew" near Farnington.

9 September: A bombing raid on Tel Aviv caused 137 deaths.

19 October: Four SM.82 bombers attacked American-operated oil refineries in the British Protectorate of Bahrain, damaging the local refineries. The raid also struck Dhahran in Saudi Arabia, but causing little damage.

15 September: In a single day, the Luftwaffe loses 60 aircraft over England during the Battle of Britain

14 November: In the Coventry Blitz Luftwaffe aircraft cause significant, and infamous, damage to Coventry, killing nearly 700 people and destroying Coventry Cathedral.

30 November: The second phase of The Blitz began against British industrial and port cities

== 1941 ==
10 February : Operation Colossus, the first British paratrooper raid, blew up a strategic aqueduct in Calitri southern Italy.

31 March/1 April: A bombing raid on Emden is the first use of the 4,000 lb (1,800 kg) HC "cookie" blockbuster bomb

15 April: The Belfast Blitz kills 1000, the greatest loss of British lives outside London from a night raid.

10 May: The longest blitz air raid on London killing 2324 people and 11,000 houses.

22 June - 3 July: In the opening phase of Operation Barbarossa, the Luftwaffe achieved air superiority by destroying some 2,000 Soviet aircraft, at a loss of only 35 aircraft (of which 15 were non-combat-related).

8 July First use of the Boeing B-17 Flying Fortress in Europe; against Wilhelmshaven

8–9 August: The Red Army Air Force began a limited bombing offensive with a raid on Berlin.

15 August: Robert Stanford Tuck led the first air mission by fighters based in eastern England against enemy-occupied territories in a "Rhubarb" sweep of the Netherlands for ground targets by two Hawker Hurricanes .

18 August: A 18 Squadron Blenheim dropped an artificial leg over France for captured Wing Commander Douglas Bader.

7/8 September: The heaviest RAF raid on Berlin to date, with 197 bombers, with 15 bombers lost.

7 November: A large raid on Berlin lost 20 bombers and caused little damage. The head of Bomber Command, Richard Peirse, was subsequently replaced in February 1942 by Arthur Harris.

7/8 December: 251 bombers target Aachen and Brest—the Brest attack was the first operational use of the Oboe navigation system

18 December: Blenheim aircraft conducted the first night intruder attack, successfully striking Soesterberg airfield in the Netherlands with bombs and attacking two German bombers in the air with guns

== 1942 ==
16 February: The first regular operations with the American Douglas Boston bomber were conducted.

8/9 March: The first city raid following 14 February Area bombing directive bombed Essen.

13/14 March: Gee radio navigation was first used during a bombing of Cologne.

25/26 March: In the largest force (254 aircraft) sent to a single target to date, bombers of an Essen mission were drawn off by decoy fire from Rheinberg.

28/29 March: The Bombing of Lübeck was the 1st major success for RAF Bomber Command against a German city.

8/9 April: The largest force to date (272 aircraft) bomb Hamburg.

17 April: The Augsburg Raid is the first to attempt low-level daylight bombing for accuracy - in this case against the factory producing engines for U-boats. Half of the 12 bombers were shot down for little damage caused.

23–29 April: The first period of the Baedeker Blitz bomb the provincial cities of Exeter, Bath, Norwich, and York.

23–27 April: Bombing of Rostock.

30 May: The first use of the bomber stream and the first British large scale operation, as part of Operation Millennium the first "Thousand Bomber" raid is sent against Cologne, Germany. Of the 1,047 aircraft sent, nearly 900 bombed the target area - the whole raid passing over in 90 minutes.

1/2 June: The second thousand-bomber raid is launched, this time targeting Essen. 956 aircraft were dispatched but the target was obscured and bombing was not effective.

11–12 June: First American daylight raid over European soil, against petroleum wells in Ploiești, Romania, along with objectives in Bulgaria, the first stages of American Bombing offensive.

25/26 June: The third "Thousand bomber" raid bombs Bremen, a new record of RAF Bomber Command losses (48 of 1,067 aircraft).

4 July: The first American bombing mission over enemy-occupied territory in Europe used 20 Boston bombers (plus 6 RAF-crewed Bostons) to attack the Alkmaar, Hammsted, and Valkenburg airfields -- only two reached the target area (two shot down, the others heavily damaged).

14 August: First German warplane downed by the USAAF. A German Focke-Wulf Fw 200 Condor reconnaissance-bomber is shot down by two US fighter pilots, flying a Curtiss P-40 Warhawk and a Lockheed P-38 Lightning, off the coast of Reykjavík, Iceland. All six German airmen are killed as the plane explodes and goes into the sea.

15 August: 82nd Airborne is the first US airborne division. (the first combat jumps were 8 November 1942 by the 509th Parachute Battalion in the North Africa Operation Torch).

17 August: 12 B-17s of the 97 BG (including one with Eaker aboard) escorted by RAF Spitfires bombed the Sotteville railyard 3 miles (4.8 km) South of Rouen, France, in the "first combat action" of the Eighth Air Force and the first B-17 bombing of Europe.

19 August: 22 B-17's drop 34 tons of bombs on Abbeville/Drucat A/F in France causing extensive damage.

20 August: 11 of 12 B-17's bomb Amiens/Longeau Marshalling Yard, France at 1801 hours without loss.

21 August: 12 B-17's are dispatched to bomb the shipyards in Rotterdam, Netherlands but is aborted due to an attack by Bf 109s and Fw 190s; 1 bomber is damaged; lack of proper coordination with the Spitfire escorts is a major factor in the failure of the mission.

24 August: 12 B-17s bomb the Ateliers et Chantiers de France shipyard in Dunkirk.

August: An intense air raid damages Diehl's plant in Stephanstraße, Nuremberg.

August/September: Case Blue included area bombardment during the Battle of Stalingrad.

2/3 September: The first use of the 8,000 lb (3,600 kg) High Capacity bomb (Blockbuster bomb) was against Karlsruhe.

9 October: First Eighth Air Force B-24 Bombing raid, bombed Industrial Plants at Lille, France.

24 October: 88 aircraft use independent routes over France to rendezvous at Lake Annecy for a daylight raid on Milan.

12 December: A B-17 named "Wulfe-Hound", of the 303rd Bombardment Group, is damaged and makes a forced landing in France, and is subsequently captured by the Luftwaffe. It is later assigned to Kampfgeschwader 200 for research purposes in September 1943.

22 December: An unsuccessful Bombing of Frankfurt am Main in World War II was the first use of the Master Bomber tactic.

== 1943 ==
27 January: The first World War II US mission flown against the German homeland bombs Kriegsmarine submarine pens in Wilhelmshaven.

5/6 March: The first raid of the Battle of the Ruhr flew RAF Bomber Command's 100,000th sortie of World War II, with 160 acres destroyed and 53 Krupps buildings bombed at Essen.

13 April: The Eighth Air Force's largest mission to date (115 B-17s) destroys half of the Focke-Wulf factory buildings in Bremen

16/17 April: A force of 327 Lancasters and Halifaxes set out to destroy the Škoda arms factory at Plzeň, in German occupied Czechoslovakia. 271 aircraft raided Mannheim as a diversion the same night. The force mistook the mental hospital near Dobřany to be the factory at Plzeň. The raid sustained the heaviest losses until that point in the air war.

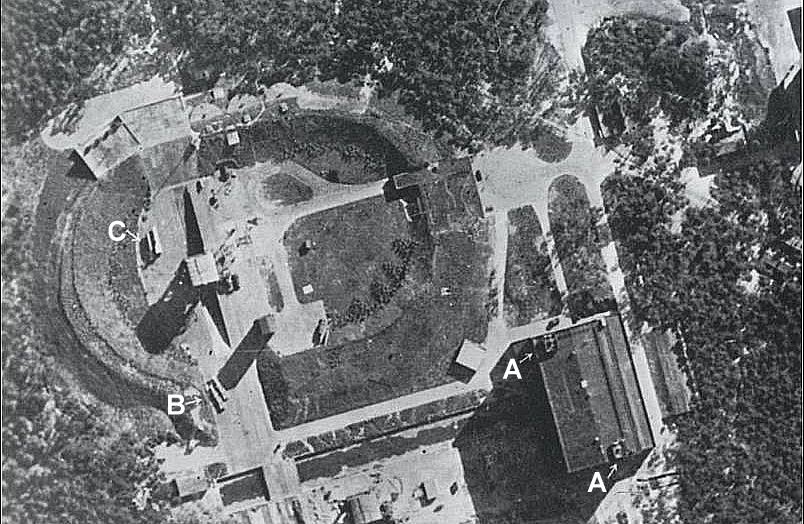
23 June 1943 RAF reconnaissance photo of Peenemünde Test Stand VII

3 May Ramrod 16 bombing of steelworks at IJmuiden

5 May: Republic P-47 Thunderbolts are first used for escorting bombers.

17 May: Operation Chastise bouncing bombs breached the Möhne and Eder Dams

11/12 June: The first two Operation Pointblank raids included a successful mass trial of H2S radar on Münster

13 June: The heaviest fighter attacks to date against the Eighth Air Force claim 26 B-17s bombing Bremen and Kiel U-boat facilities.

26 June: A 100 BG B-17 surrendered and then escaped.

20/21 June: Operation Bellicose targets Würzburg radar production and is the first bombing of a V-2 rocket facility.

19 July: The first Allied World War II bombing of Rome drops 800 tons of bombs on Littoro and Clampino airports, causing immense damage and 2000 deaths

24 July: After the US developed an airborne radar immune to Window, the first use of the countermeasure (40 tonnes—92 million strips) were dropped during a Hamburg bombing mission.

29 July: First use of unguided air-to-air rockets against American combat box formations of heavy bombers by JG 1 Oesau and JG 11, attacking with Bf 109Gs and Fw 190As each armed with pairs of Werfer-Granate 21 rocket ordnance, developed from the 21 cm Nebelwerfer 42 ground barrage rocket system.

1 August: Flying from North Africa Operation Tidal Wave bombs the oil refineries at Ploiești. A large number of the bombers are lost for little strategic benefit. Five Medals of Honor are awarded to American aircrew.

13 August: The first Ninth Air Force raid on Austria bombed the Wiener Neustadt Bf 109 factory

17 August: The double-strike USAAF Schweinfurt-Regensburg mission was the third shuttle bombing. British aircraft operate diversionary attacks.

17/18 August: The Operation Hydra bombing of V-2 facilities at Peenemünde began Operation Crossbow.

18 August: The counterattack against Operation Hydra included the first operational use of Schräge Musik by German fighters

25 August: The first use of a guided anti-ship missile in wartime occurs over the Bay of Biscay, as HMS Bideford and HMS Landguard are damaged by Luftwaffe-deployed Henschel Hs 293 rocket-boosted, MCLOS-guidance glide bombs.

27 August: The first mission against a "Heavy" Crossbow site bombed the Watten V-2 rocket bunker

9 September: The Luftwaffe's KG 100 bomber wing is involved with the world's first successful use of a precision-guided munition in modern military history, through their sinking of the Italian battleship Roma, using the Fritz X armored gravity-propulsion PGM munition.

10 October: As a result of the June "surrender/escape" of a 100 BG B-17, out of the 13 B-17s of 100 BG attacking a railyard in Münster, only the B-17F of Robert Rosenthal survives to return safely to RAF Thorpe Abbotts in England.

14 October: The Second Raid on Schweinfurt (Black Thursday) resulted in 122 damaged bombers and 650 MIA/KIA.

1 November: A Combined Bomber Offensive progress report estimates that 19/19/9 German towns & cities have been virtually destroyed/severely damaged/more effectively damaged – another report claims 10% of German war potential had been destroyed

2 November: The USAAF 12th Air Force conducted the first large Allied aerial attack against Zadar, Italy

2 November: A raid targeting the Wiener Neustadt Messerschmitt plant damaged the nearby Raxwerke V-2 rocket facility.

3 November: A Wilhelmshaven raid is the first Eighth Air Force blind-bombing mission to completely destroy the aiming point, the Eighth's first 500-plane mission, and the first use by the US of H2X radar

18/19 November: The "Battle of Berlin" aerial campaign bombing began

22/23 November: The largest force sent to bomb Berlin to date (764 aircraft) conducted the most effective World War II raid on Berlin

2 December: 100 Ju-88s bombed the port of Bari, sinking 28 ships including the American cargo ship SS John Harvey which was secretly carrying mustard gas. There were 83 military casualties from the poison. Autopsies indicated excess white blood cells, and the discovery led to the use of the gas to combat leukemia. Records were completely declassified in 1959.

5 December: B-26s of the Ninth Air Force attacked three V-1 ski sites near Ligescourt, the first No-Ball missions.

== 1944 ==
21 January: The unsuccessful Operation Steinbock, the first mass bombing of London, began the Baby Blitz

30 January: The first U.S. Intruder operation was conducted by P-47s and accurately preceded the bombers to strike fighters at Villaorba airfield.

6–27 February: The Soviet Air Force launched bombing raids against several Finnish cities. The greatest air raids once again targeted Helsinki. In this manner the USSR hoped to force Finland to break its ties with Germany and agree to a peace settlement.

19/20 February: After 14.9% of Halifaxes that crossed the coast were lost on a raid to Leipzig, Handley Page Halifax Merlin engintober 1943 Second Raid on Schweinfurt

6 March: The first large scale US attack on Berlin (some 600 bombers) dropped 1600 tons of bombs - 160-170 of 800-900 fighters are shot down

24 April: The APS-15 "Mickey" radar was first used on a Ploiești mission.

2 June: The first US shuttle bombing mission, Operation Frantic Joe, bombed Debrecen
( German fighters subsequently attack the bombers on Soviet airfields at Focşani)

2–5 June: In preparation for Operation Overlord, Operation Cover bombed transportation and airfield targets in Northern France and "coastal deed V-1 flying bombs that reached Britain (of about 1,200) were air-launched from Heinkel He 111s (403 were downed)

23/24 July: The first major raid (629 aircraft) on a German city for two months bombs Kiel

25 July: Mission 494 (1581/500 bombers/fighters) supporting Operation Cobra was the most effective saturation bombing/carpet bombing/area bombardment of the Normandy Campaign, killing US General McNair.

26 July: The first aerial victory for a jet fighter in air combat history occurs as a Messerschmitt Me 262A-1a of Erprobungskommando 262 mortally damages a de Havilland Mosquito reconnaissance aircraft of No. 540 Squadron RAF.

28 July: The first operational use of rocket-powered point-defense interceptors occurs as Me 163Bs of I. Gruppe/JG 400 take off from Brandis to defend against a USAAF strategic bombing raid on the Merseburg/Leuna synthetic fuel production complex.

July: An air raid wipes out a factory making prototype Focke-Achgelis Fa 223 helicopters in Laupheim.

27 August: The RAF restarted daylight bombing of Germany (first since 12 August 1941) with an attack on the Homberg Fischer-Tropsch plant in Hamburg.

13 & 17 August: Le Havre (Mission 549) and La Pallice (Mission 559) were the targets for the first uses of the BAT guided bomb

8 September: Operation Penguin began with the first V-2 rocket launches against Paris and London

17 September: The last UK-USSR-Italy-UK shuttle bombing was completed as 72 B-17s and 59 P-51s flew from Italy without bombs to the UK; 70 B-17s 57 P-51s land safely in the UK.

18 September: Stalin finally gives permission for Allied planes to use Soviet airfields. The planes conducted air drops during the Warsaw Uprising and Operation Frantic.

== 1945 ==
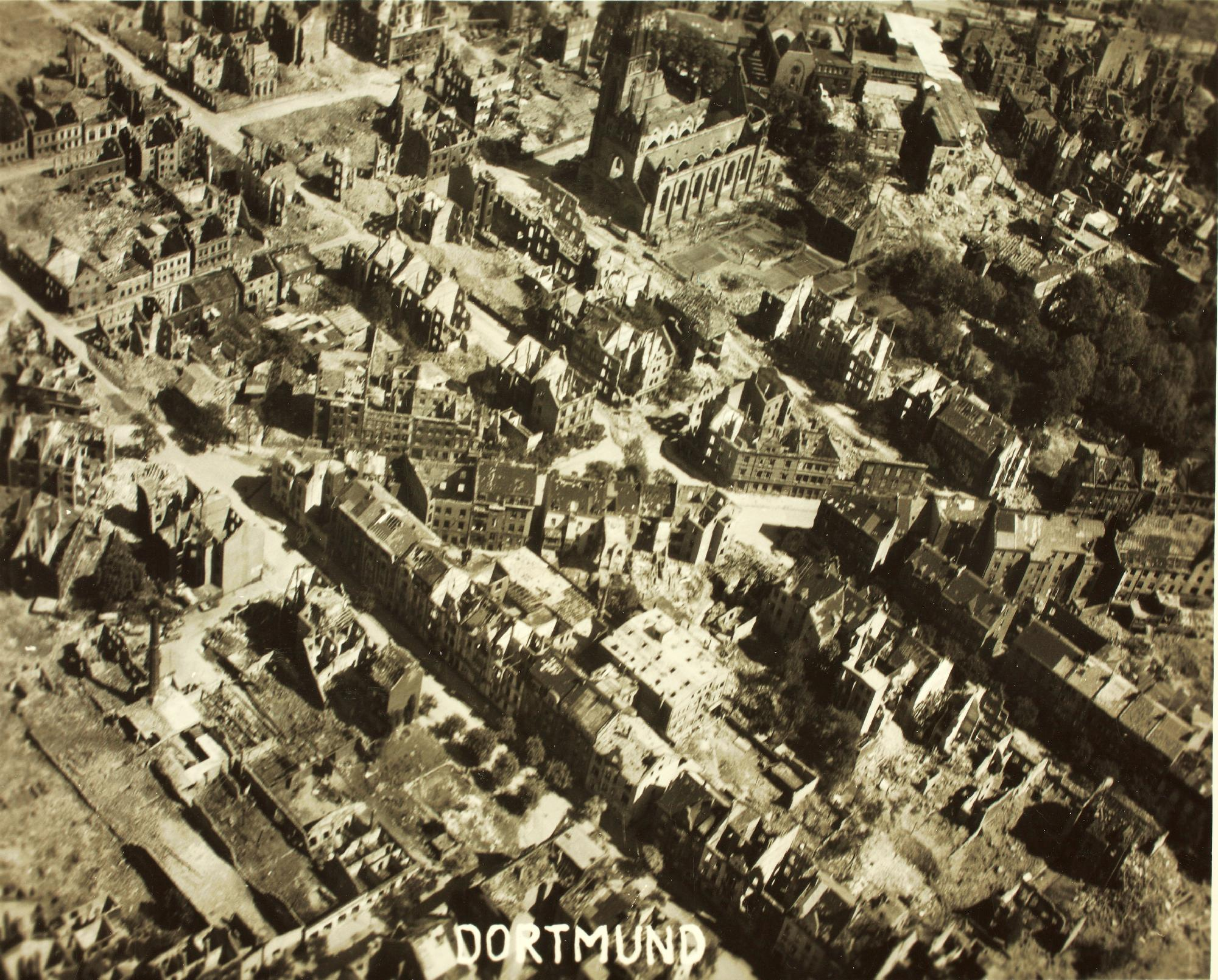
Dortmund city center in April 1945.

1 January: Operation Bodenplatte supported the last major German offensive, Operation Nordwind, with inconclusive results.

5 January: The first mission of Operation Cornflakes begins when a mail train to Linz was bombed. Fake mailbags containing anti-Nazi propaganda were then dropped on the wreckage in the hope the letters would be unwittingly delivered by the Reichspost. The OSS dropped two million Das Neue Deutschland (German: The New Germany) propaganda newspapers during this psychological warfare operation; which ended in February.

3 February: The USAAF conducts its largest raid of the war against Berlin. The attack is led by Major Robert Rosenthal of the 100th Bombardment Group (Heavy). Judge-President of the People's Court Roland Freisler is killed in the bombing.

8-19 February: Allies begin attacks on 200 targets with 20,000 bombers and escort fighters to assist with Operation Veritable, Grenade, and Operation Clarion.

13–15 February: The Allied Bombing of Dresden causes a firestorm that kills up to 25,000 people in the city.

3 March: The RAF mistakenly bombed the densely populated Bezuidenhout neighbourhood in the Dutch city of The Hague. The bomber crews had intended to bomb the Haagse Bos district, where the Germans had installed V-2 launching facilities that had been used to attack English cities. 511 residents were killed and approximately 30,000 were left homeless.

12 March: The RAF drop 4,851 tonnes of bombs on Dortmund using 1108 aircraft (748 Lancasters, 292 Halifaxes, 68 Mosquitos). Up to 98% of buildings in the city center are destroyed. It would be the heaviest raid on a single target in World War II.

14 March: A railway viaduct at Bielefeld is destroyed by the first Grand Slam bomb to be dropped in combat by an Avro Lancaster. The attack by No. 617 Squadron RAF succeeds after 54 attacks using smaller bombs had failed.

17 March: Adolf Hitler orders the SS to fire V-2 rockets at the Ludendorff Bridge during the Battle of Remagen. All 11 missiles miss; none land closer than 500 m (1,600 ft) from the bridge.

18 March: The largest number of Me 262s to date launch their most concentrated attacks against Allied bomber formation. Mission 894 attacking Berlin (1,329 bombers and 733 fighters) loses 13 bombers and 6 fighters. The AAF claim 25 Luftwaffe aircraft.

22 March: Two hundred L-4 Grasshopper spotter planes each carrying one armed infantryman (instead of an observer) cross the Rhine to form a bridgehead for the US 3rd Army near Oppenheim. (Light aviation became a major part of the US Army's Field Artillery fire detection center on 4 June 1942.)

29 March: At 9am, the last V-1 flying bomb to hit Britain struck a field near Datchworth, a village in Hertfordshire, England.

10 April: An Arado Ar 234, based in Nazi-occupied Denmark, conducts an unmolested reconnaissance mission over northern Scotland. It is the final Luftwaffe operation over the British Isles.

19 April: The last RAF air operation using Grand Slam bombs in Europe takes place over Heligoland. Twenty aircraft from 617 Squadron, six with Grand Slams and the remainder with smaller Tallboy bombs, along with 16 aircraft from 9 Squadron attack the island's coastal gun-batteries. No aircraft were lost. A total of 42 Grand Slams were dropped in air operations over Germany.

25 April: The last Eighth Air Force full-scale mission in the ETO hit the Škoda Works at Pilsen in Czechoslovakia (B-17s), while B-24s bombed rail complexes surrounding Hitler's Berchtesgaden.

2 May: An RAF Mosquito from 608 squadron in Norfolk conducts the last British bombing raid of the war over Nazi Germany. It dropped a 4,000lb bomb on the naval port at Kiel.

3 May: Typhoons of 83 Group from the 2nd Tactical Air Force attack the passenger liners Cap Arcona, Thielbek, Athen, and Deutschland moored in the Bay of Lübeck (Baltic Sea). Hundreds of concentration camp prisoners are killed on the sinking ships because intelligence they are on board is not passed on to the flight crews.

7 May: The final European dogfight of World War II, between a small American L-4 Grasshopper liaison aircraft using personal .45 caliber pistols, and a small German liaison aircraft, a Fieseler Fi 156 Storch, forced the German aircrew to land and surrender.
