= Operation Pig Iron =

WWII US propaganda operation

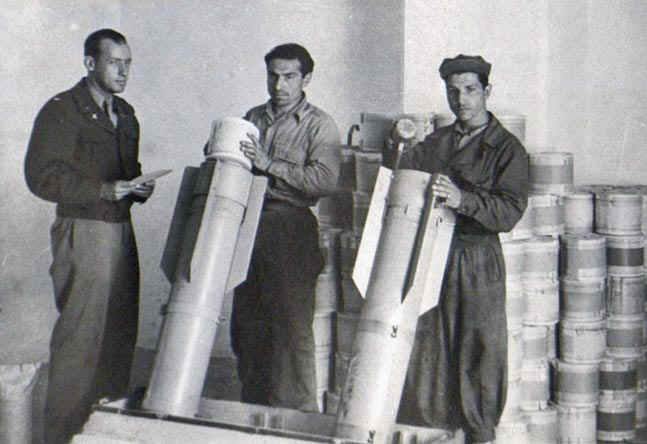
Packing of miniature issues of the magazine by OSS members in "bombs" as part of Operation Pig Iron

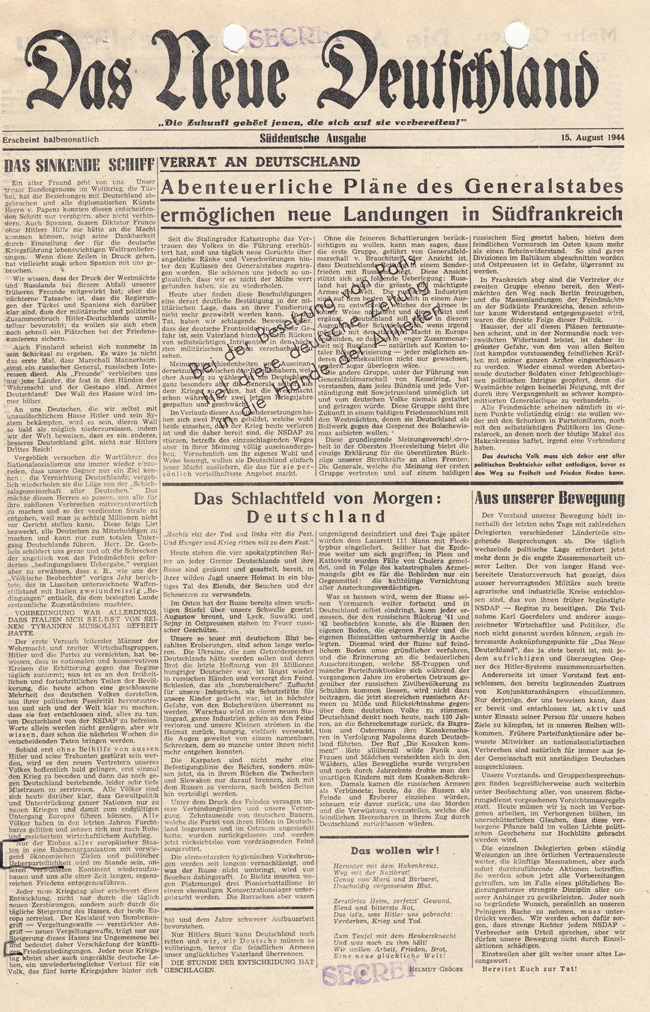
The first miniature edition of the magazine Das Neue Deutschland

Operation Pig Iron was a secret service measure planned and carried out by the American Office of Strategic Services (OSS) from the summer of 1944 onwards during the Second World War. The aim was to indoctrinate the enemy by using "bombs" containing miniature editions of the propaganda magazine Das Neue Deutschland. These bombs were dropped by plane over enemy territory. With more than 8.9 million (of a total of about 9.5 million) printed copies of the journal, the miniature edition was the most massive way of distributing this propaganda tool.

The magazines, which previously had been printed in normal format, were reduced in size by a photo-technical process to 10 × 6 ½ inches - which corresponded to a quarter of the normal size - and then processed into rolls of 1500 copies each. These rolls were finally packed into specially designed cylindrical devices. Afterwards they were transported by truck from Rome to Foggia, where they were filled into bombs. The US Air Force stationed in that city subsequently flew these bombs to the centre of the enemy in Germany or Austria to drop them on the ground.

As other propaganda material was also to be distributed in this way - in which the obvious Allied origin could not be denied - a cunning trick was used to make the alleged German opposition magazine Das Neue Deutschland appear plausible. To do this, an additional imprint was placed on the front page of the journals that were being dropped, which was supposed to point to alleged chance finds during the advance of Allied forces. Thus, for example, the following text appeared on the front page: (in German) "During the occupation of Paris this German newspaper fell into the hands of the Allies". The success of this measure could also be seen in the fierce counter-reaction on the German side that followed later, for example, when Heinrich Himmler's own propaganda magazine Das Schwarze Korps drew attention to the magazine's traitorous authors. This led to devastating comments on the contents of the journal and on the authors themselves.

Operation Pig Iron is regarded as the most successful US-American measure to distribute the propaganda magazine Das Neue Deutschland.

== Sources ==
- "THE STORY OF CORNFLAKES, PIG IRON AND SHEET IRON". psywar.org. Archived from the original on 2019-04-11.
- "Operation Pig Iron". codenames.info.
