= Sauerkraut missions =

The Sauerkraut missions (Operation Sauerkraut) were secret service operations planned and carried out by the American Office of Strategic Services (OSS) during the Second World War from July 1944 to at least March 1945. The aim was to enable rapid dissemination of Allied propaganda material by the use of German prisoners of war.

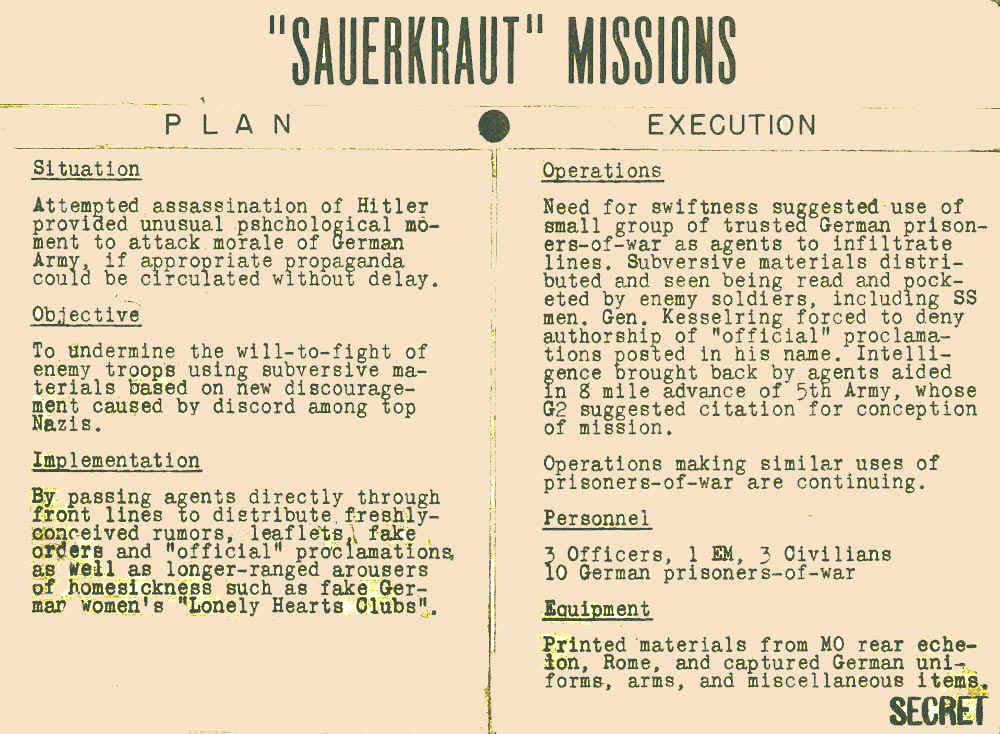
Original document of the OSS on the Sauerkraut missions

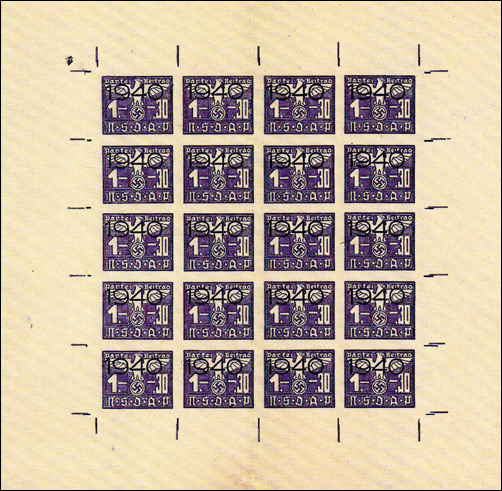
Counterfeit NSDAP-party dues stamps

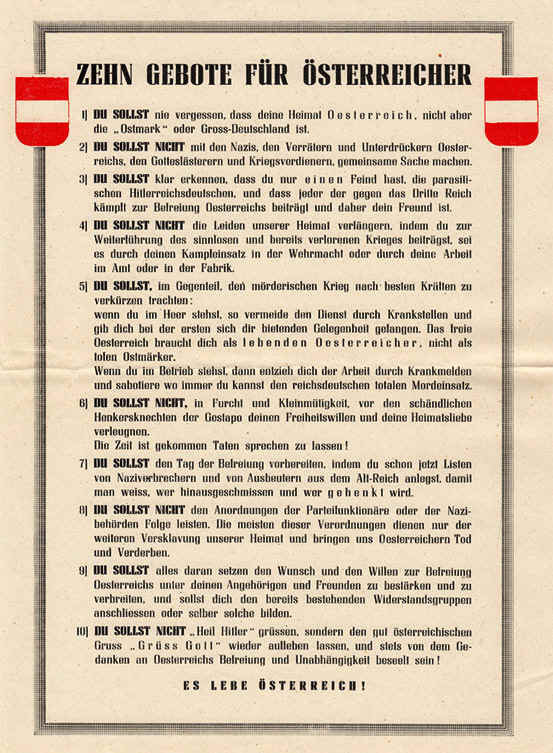
Propaganda flyer for Austria

The idea of using German prisoners of war as agents arose after the failed assassination attempt on Adolf Hitler on July 20, 1944. By exploiting this unexpected psychological advantage, the deployment of apparently German soldiers in Wehrmacht uniforms was considered particularly suitable for indoctrinating the enemy without much delay.

In a prisoner of war camp for Germans near Naples, efforts were made to recruit the first candidates for the mission. At the same time, suitable leaflets were developed which referred to the attempted coup on July 20 and were then to be smuggled into German territory. Thus, for example, it was claimed that Walther von Brauchitsch had taken over the command in Germany, or German troops were called upon to carry out revolutionary measures against the Nazi regime. An extra issue of the magazine Das Neue Deutschland was also produced, which pointed to alleged opposition groups within the German Reich.

An initial class of 16 prisoners of war were sent to Rome to be equipped with Wehrmacht uniforms, forged documents, weapons, and compasses. Money in Italian currency, cigarettes and first aid equipment were also included. In small groups, they were smuggled across the river Arno. They were to penetrate as deeply as possible behind the German lines and spread the propaganda material they had been given. For example, leaflets and magazines were to be placed on trees, in cars, in buildings and on roads.

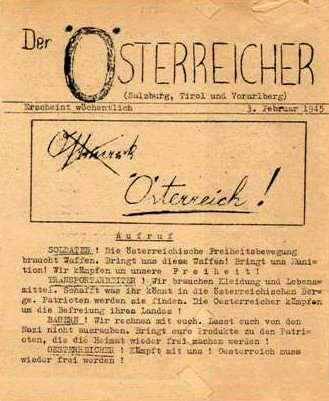
Flyer deliberately printed in coarse quality

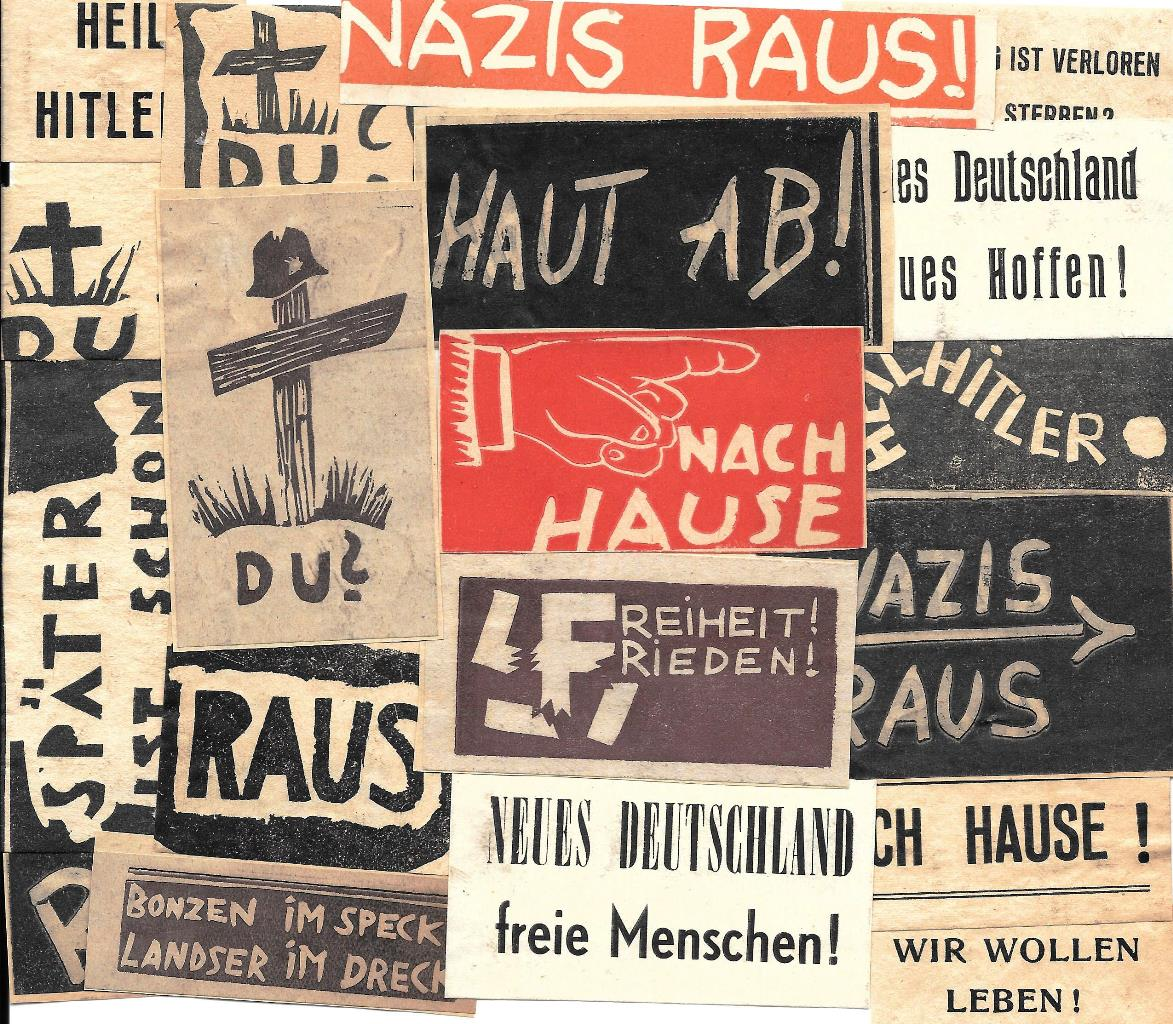
Various gummed labels, often carried and distributed by agents

Of particular importance were the forged documents that were given to the agents. Since the German side was constantly changing certain recognition features for security reasons, the US side had to regularly improve them, which apparently succeeded brilliantly. Although agents of the operation were later reportedly checked by German military police on several occasions, there was only one case in which such an agent was exposed. While the forged documents had to look as perfect as possible - and this included forged party books along with the party fee stamps - the propaganda material provided was deliberately printed in a much coarser quality. This was to avoid the impression that the stickers, leaflets or magazines were material produced abroad by the enemy using high-quality printing presses.

In total, about 13 missions of Operation Sauerkraut were carried out. For this purpose, small groups were smuggled behind the German lines from July 25, 1944, until at least March 21, 1945.

Since international law prohibits deliberately placing prisoners of war in dangerous situations, all Operation Sauerkraut personnel had to sign a declaration certifying their voluntary participation. US lawyers considered this procedure to be indispensable in the event that after the war legal action was taken against the US Army before an international court. Although the German agents of Operation Sauerkraut were promised preferential treatment for their services by the U.S. side, they were merely returned to the regular POW camps after their deployment. There they were shunned by fellow prisoners of war to the knowledge of their agent activities and despised as traitors.
