= Das Neue Deutschland =

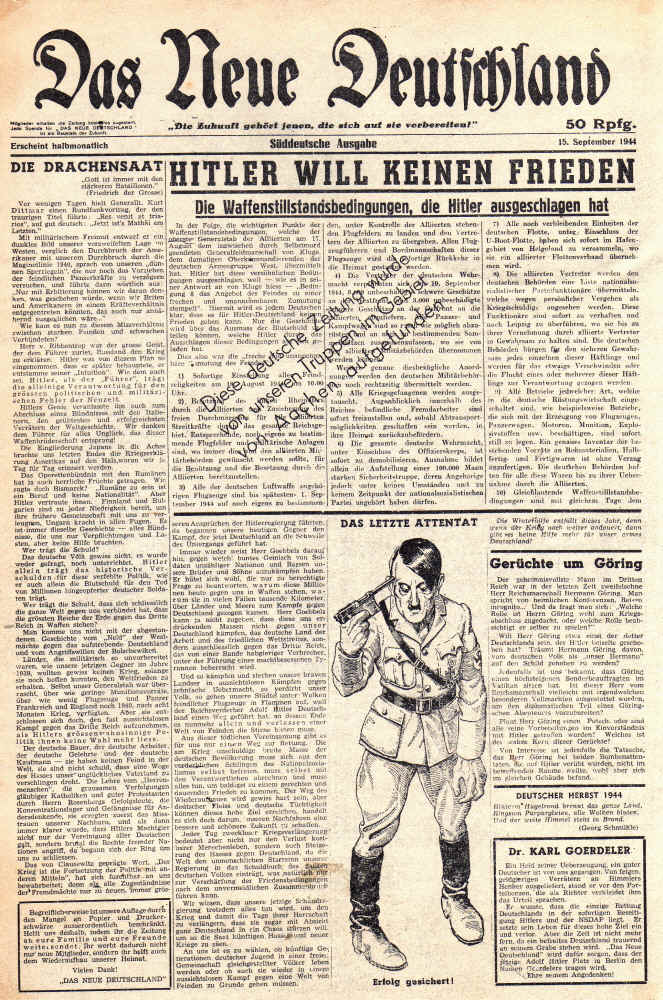
Issue of the magazine Das Neue Deutschland of September 15, 1944

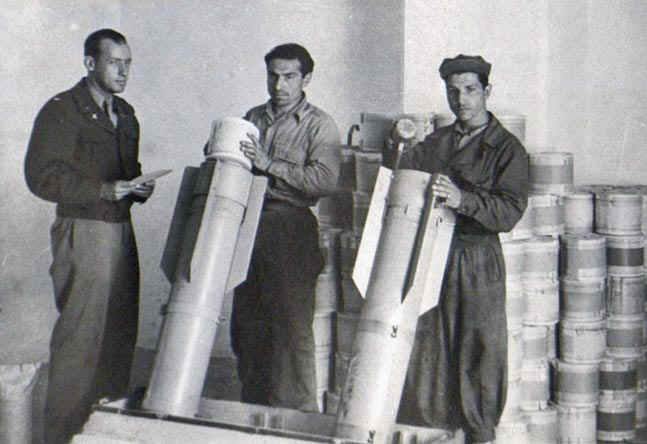
Packing of miniature issues of the magazine by OSS members in "bombs" as part of Operation Pig Iron

Das Neue Deutschland (DND; English: The new Germany) was an alleged freedom movement that was founded by the American Office of Strategic Services (OSS) in June 1944 during the Second World War. Its main organ was a magazine of the same name, which was brought to Germany by resistance fighters, former German prisoners of war, and with the help of airplanes. The aim was to create the impression, through propagandistic articles in this magazine, that an underground movement existed on the territory of the German Reich with the intention of overthrowing the Nazi regime. In the editorial design of the magazine, care was taken to ensure that, as far as possible, no reference to hostile propaganda was discernible; it was imperative to convey the idea of an opposition independent of the Allies that existed within Germany. In order to find a meaningful name for the journal, the planning group asked for more than 30 suggestions, all of which, however, turned out to be unsuitable. Either they were names that had already been used during the Weimar Republic and thus had negative connotations, or they were names of smaller local splinter groups that had been used earlier. Since the magazine was intended to convey the idea of a new Germany after the Nazi dictatorship, the final name was eventually agreed upon, which apparently had never been used in the past either. Nevertheless, it obviously had been overlooked that a monthly magazine for the "Nationalsozialistische Weltanschauung" (NS-worldview) of the same name already existed in the 1930s.

The total circulation of the magazine is estimated at 9,514,620 copies.

In order to dispel emerging doubts in the population by a too sudden appearance of the magazine - which might have indicated hostile propaganda - a preparatory measure was planned and carried out. For this purpose various leaflets were produced which were intended to give the impression that various smaller underground movements already existed on German territory, which now merged into a united, larger one. These leaflets were given names such as Friedensbote (Messenger of Peace) or Unser Kampf (Our Struggle), and 10,000 of them were smuggled in, mainly in occupied France. From there they seeped into the territory of the German Reich. Thus, about four weeks before the appearance of the magazine Das Neue Deutschland, a way was to be paved as inconspicuously as possible in order to give the publication of the magazine a plausible character. In order to make the alleged German opposition magazine appear credible, additional texts were printed on the front page of the magazines, which were supposed to point to allegedly accidental finds during the advance of Allied forces. For example, the following text (in German) appeared there: "During the occupation of Paris this German newspaper fell into the hands of the Allies" or "This German newspaper was found by our troops in the Aachen area".

The first 4,500 copies of the magazine were printed and packaged in Algiers, Algeria from June 28, 1944. Because no German umlauts were available for the printing presses on the spot, the originally planned start of printing was delayed by 19 days. The missing characters first had to be requested via Washington and reached Algiers by airmail on June 22, 1944. From mid-July 1944, the printing plant was relocated to Rome.

Immediately after the failed assassination attempt on Hitler on July 20, 1944, it was decided to print a Das Neue Deutschland Extra edition, which was issued in 50,000 copies. This was intended to respond as quickly as possible to the dramatic events that had almost led to a coup in Germany. In order to distribute this Extra edition, people in full Wehrmacht uniforms were successfully deployed for the first time to infiltrate the German lines. This action was called Operation Sauerkraut.

When the defeat of Germany was already clearly foreseeable, a so-called Project Olive was worked out at the end of February 1945. For this purpose, alleged Wehrmacht soldiers were to advance to the headquarters of Albert Kesselring at Lake Garda to inform him that thousands of Wehrmacht members had joined the movement Das Neue Deutschland and had turned against Hitler. Kesselring was now to take over the supreme command of the movement in Italy. When planning the action, it was not yet known that surrender negotiations had already been initiated over General Wolff. The Project Olive was therefore postponed and not carried out later.

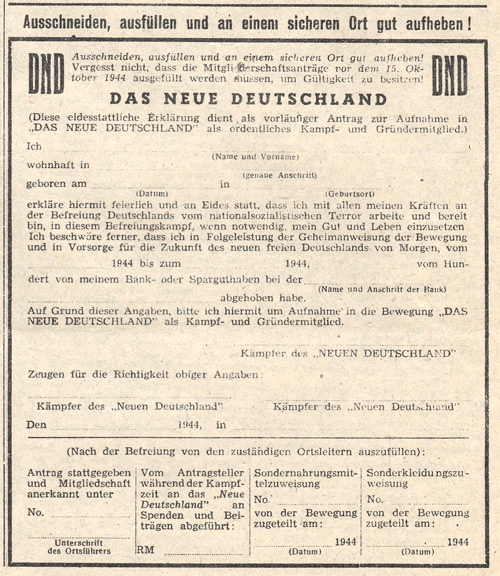
Membership card for the movement Das Neue Deutschland. The top line translates as: "Cut out, fill in and keep well in a safe place!"

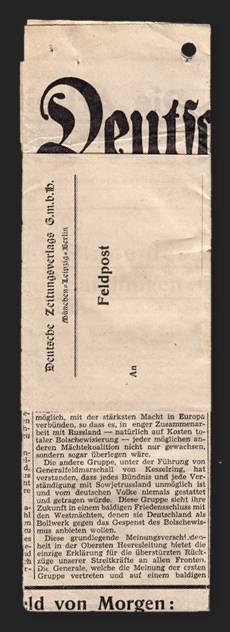
The magazine prepared for mail bags as part of Operation Cornflakes

The magazine is considered the most successful U.S. subversive action during the Second World War against the Nazi regime. From 1944 onwards, numerous copies of the journal were found in Berlin, Plzeň, Lübeck, the Rhineland and even in the Dachau concentration camp. Magazines were discovered in the shoes or headgear of prisoners of war. The great psychological importance of the magazine can also be seen in the fact that the German side tried to limit the damage with numerous countermeasures. For example, Heinrich Himmler had the contents of the magazine revoked in the strongest terms in his own propaganda magazine entitled Das Schwarze Korps (The black corps). In addition, massive attention was drawn to the enemy propaganda in radio broadcasts and through information leaflets for members of the Wehrmacht. For unknown reasons, however, such extensive counter-propaganda did not begin until January 1945, six months after the first appearance of the DND. From the so-called Mitteilungen für die Truppe (Messages for the troops), a weekly political "information magazine" for members of the Wehrmacht, it is clear, however, that the German side was aware of the magazine's existence as early as August 14, 1944, and that its effects caused great concern. In order to give the alleged freedom movement a boost, so-called membership cards were printed in the magazine from autumn 1944 onwards, which were to be cut out, filled in and kept in a safe place. Persons who were willing to be accepted as fighting and founding members of the movement Das Neue Deutschland were intended to gain considerable advantages after the war and the subsequent liberation. Thus, the prospect of allocations of special food and special clothing were promised. Surveys of prisoners of war carried out after the end of the war showed that the journal had a relatively high level of recognition. It is estimated that 95 out of 100 readers of the journal believed in an underground organization or in the truthfulness of the journal. Thus, as a rule, numerous owners of a DND membership card later refused to hand it over to their interviewers because they were afraid of losing the proof of their anti-Nazi attitude. Typical comments from prisoner-of-war soldiers on the contents of the magazine were, for example

- The magazine destroyed my last chance to believe in Nazi propaganda.
- I am firmly convinced that the text is completely true, as I have witnessed enough Nazi atrocities
- I believe that the newspaper was distributed by Catholic groups in Germany and not by former members of political parties in Germany. Even if the content of the magazine is partly true, I do not consider the presentation as a whole very effective
- I was very impressed with the DND. It gave me hope that the war would end soon
- I was amazed at how well the editors of the magazine were informed. The texts mostly corresponded to everything that was known in the troop as word-of-mouth propaganda
- This magazine was my weapon in the fight against the Nazis
- After reading a few issues of the magazine, I was eager to become a member of the movement and filled out the membership card

Important actions for the distribution of the magazine were on the one hand the very successful Operation Pig Iron, in which the magazine in miniature format was dropped by plane over German territory; on the other hand Operation Cornflakes, in which the magazine was distributed in fake mail bags.
