= Air war during Operation Overlord =

Part of the Second World War

The air war during Operation Overlord, alongside the Battle of Britain, the carrier battles in the Pacific and the strategic air war against the German Reich, was one of the most significant air battles of the Second World War. It took place between April and August 1944 in the course of the Allied landings in northern France (→ Operation Overlord).

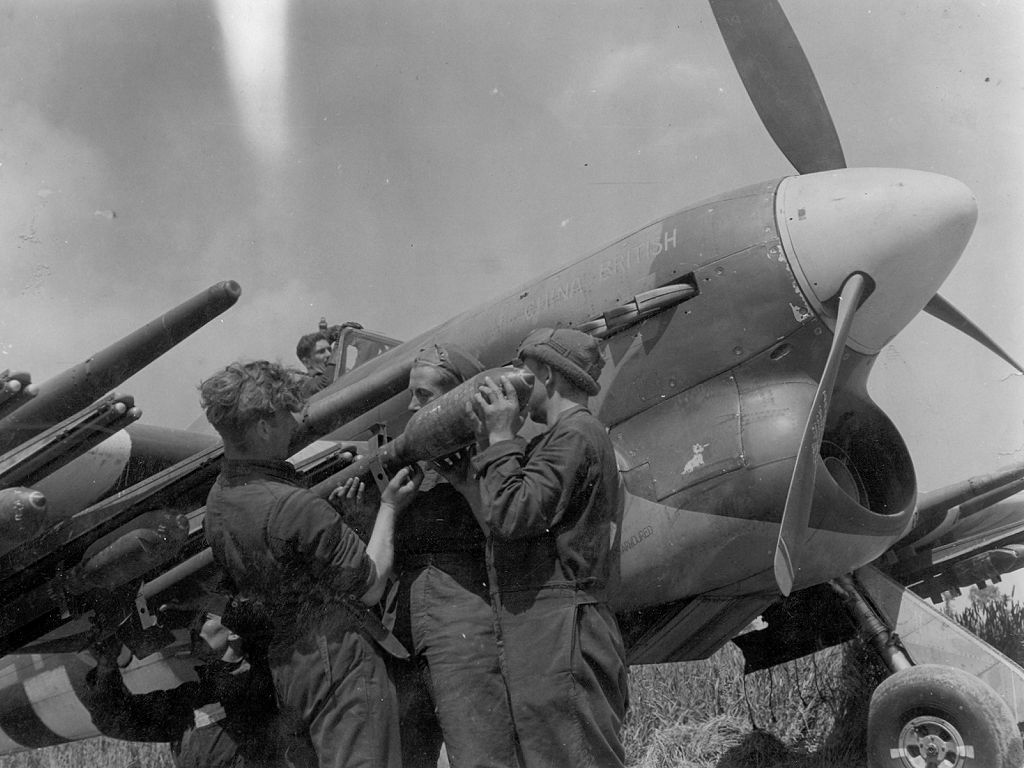
A Hawker Typhoon is armed with air-to-ground missiles, May 1944.

The Allied landing in Normandy was also made possible by the air superiority of the Allied forces. Before June 6, 1944, known as D-Day, the Allied air forces prepared for the invasion. They bombed German supply lines, artillery batteries and supported the French Resistance from the air with ammunition and equipment.

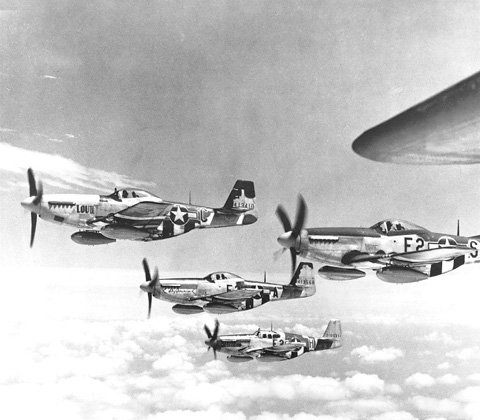
North American P-51 Mustangs with black and white "invasion stripes" to better distinguish them from Air Force aircraft

During D-Day, Allied fighters secured the airspace over the landing area and bomber squadrons attacked German positions in the hinterland. At the same time, Allied aircraft searched the sea for German submarines to protect the Armada and the supply ships. As the Germans had believed in a landing at the Strait of Calais and in some cases still did in June 1944 (German situation in Normandy in 1944), they were only able to oppose the Allies with a few fighter planes on D-Day. The majority of the units had been moved further inland shortly beforehand.

After D-Day, the Allies supported their offensives on the ground with concentrated bombing. Allied fighter-bombers searched Normandy for German troop units and strafed them to prevent them from being used against the land forces. The German air force was barely able to counter the Allied air forces and the advance on the ground. The German Wehrmacht hoped to repel the invasion with "wonder weapons" such as "Blitzbombers" and jet fighters (which were not used, however), but above all with the deployment of battle-hardened armored divisions. The German Wehrmacht also attacked British cities with the "retaliation weapons" V1 and V2.

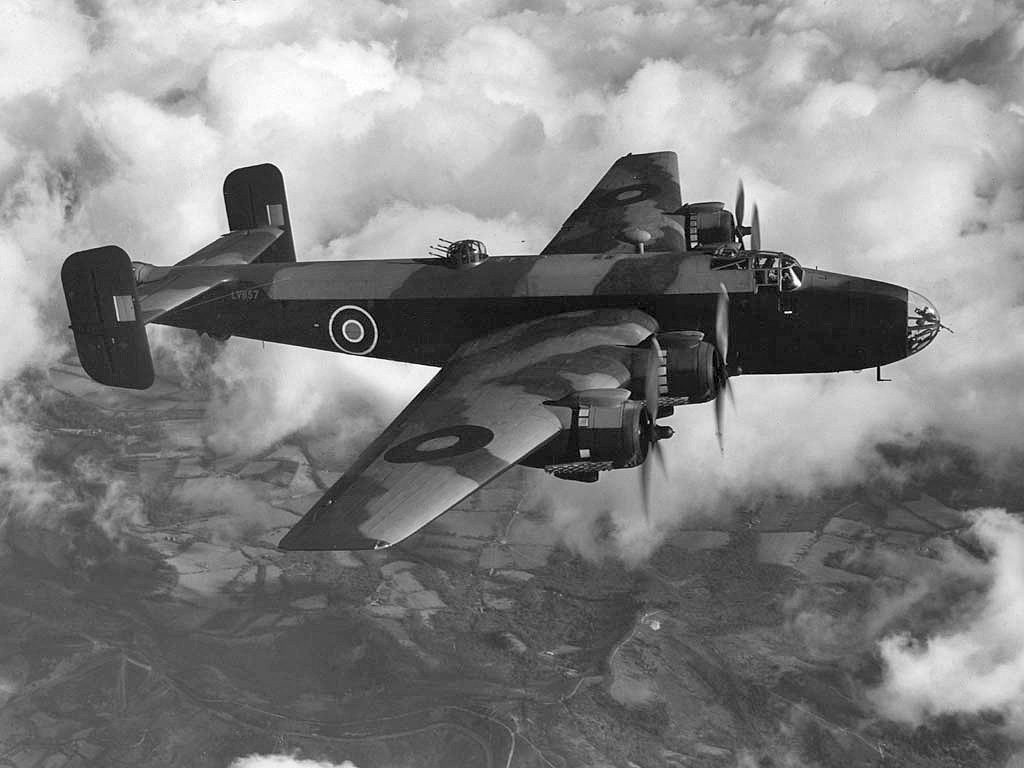
A Handley Page Halifax Mark III, an RAF heavy bomber that was also used to tow cargo gliders

The Allied air forces were able to fulfill all the tasks assigned to them, albeit with delays due to bad weather, as in the case of the Battle of Caen. The scale of the forces deployed was unprecedented; the loss of almost 17,000 Allied aircrew in less than three months was the highest human and material sacrifice in the history of the air war. The German air force was unable to decisively counter the Allied superiority. The attempt to halt the Allied advance with a massive counterattack during unfavorable flying weather in the winter of 1944 also failed (Battle of the Bulge, Operation Bodenplatte).

== Background, planning and situation of the opponents of the war ==
=== Allied preparation for Operation Overlord and tasks for the air forces ===
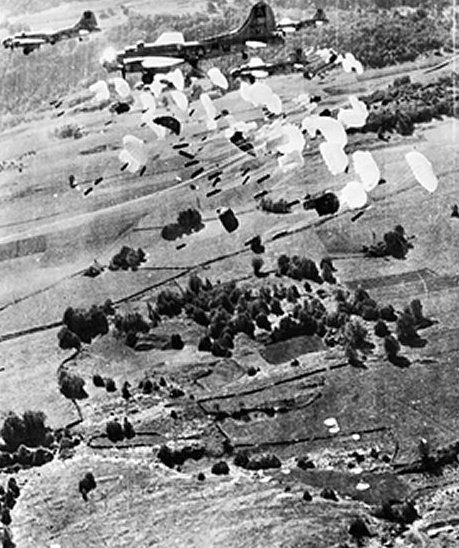
USAAF B-17 bombers drop supplies for the Resistance in occupied France, 1944.

On January 11, 1944, the Allied air raids began in direct connection with the preparations for Operation Overlord. Until the start of the invasion, the missions had the following objectives, which were pursued in parallel:

1. Supplying the resistance groups in occupied France (Résistance) with weapons and equipment used to carry out sabotage operations.
2. Attack on the German rocket launching bases on the Channel coast, which were about to be completed (Operation Crossbow).
3. Attacks against German transportation facilities in the future landing area, mainly against facilities of the German-controlled French railroad (Transportation Plan).
4. Attacks against German air force installations, in particular against Reich defense bases and their final assembly plants.

Four months before the start of Operation Overlord, the Allies carried out a series of air raids against targets on the Channel coast, the Dutch coast and targets in Reich territory, partly to test the German Luftwaffe's defensive capabilities. During these operations, which became known as Big Week among the Allied crews, it became apparent that the Allied air forces could achieve air superiority anywhere and at any time.

In addition, in April 1944, oil depots were set up in the production area around the Romanian city of Ploiești and, from May 1944, an air offensive was launched on the German fuel industry in the Reich territory, which led to a shortage of aviation fuel and further restricted the Luftwaffe's freedom of movement.

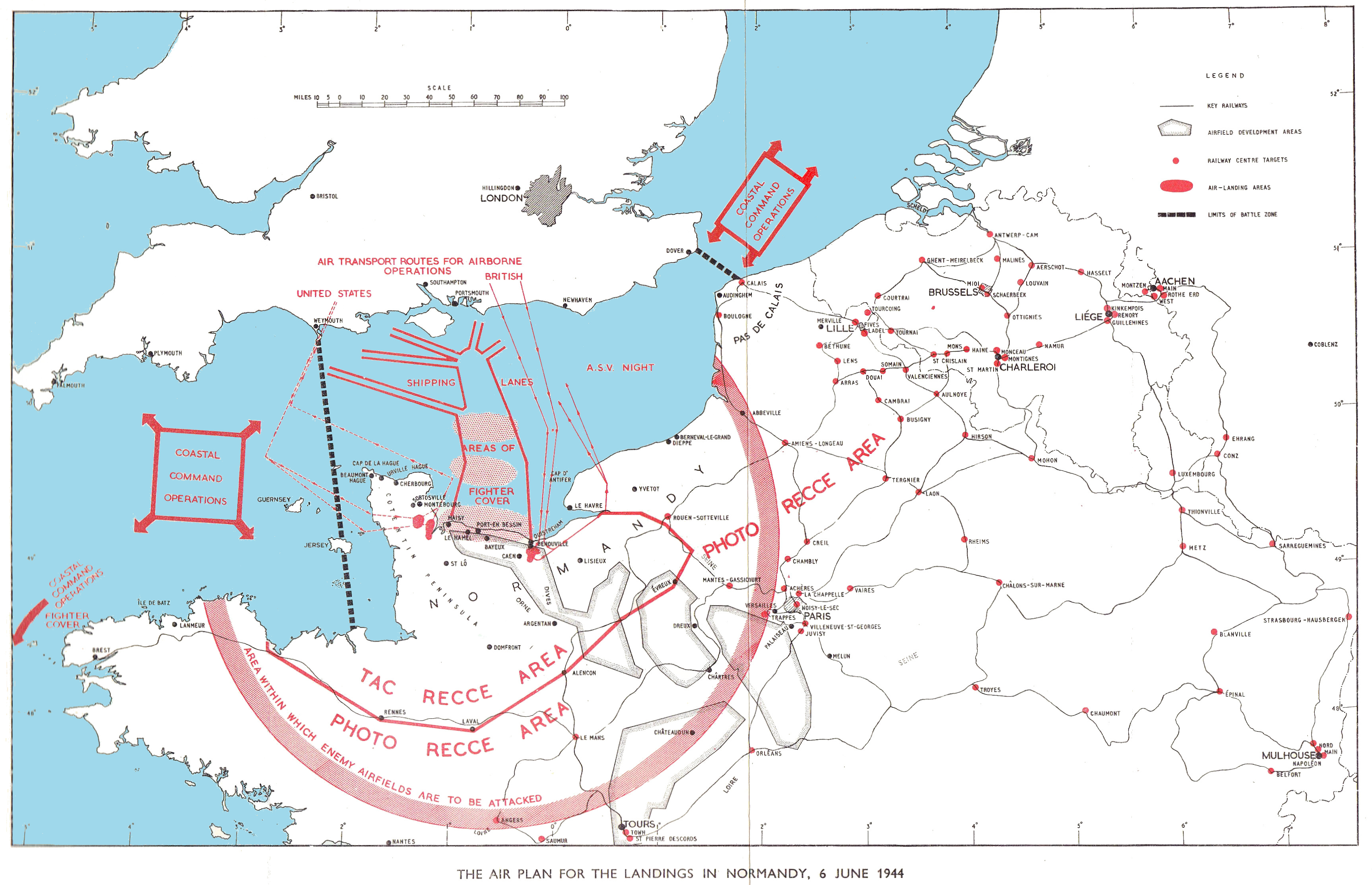
Air plan for D-Day

=== Allied air forces involved ===
Air Chief Marshal Trafford Leigh-Mallory was commander-in-chief of the Allied Expeditionary Air Force (AEAF), the largest and most versatile air armada of all time. Under his command were airborne fleets, tactical air fleets, strategic air fleets, the Royal Air Force Coastal Command and the Air Defense of Great Britain.

==== Airborne fleet ====
- No. 38 Group AEAF and No. 46 RAF Transport Command with a total of 478 transport aircraft and 1,120 cargo gliders for airborne operations.
- 9th Troop Carrier Command of the 9th Air Force with a total of 813 transport aircraft and 511 cargo gliders.

=== Tactical air fleets ===
==== Development history ====
During the Western Campaign in 1940, the methods used by the Allied air forces, especially the Royal Air Force, against the rapidly advancing units of the German land army were still unsatisfactory. The units intended for close air support, which were equipped with outdated Fairey Battle aircraft, were hardly able to achieve any tactical success and were almost completely wiped out.

During the African campaign, which for Great Britain was a continuation of the land war against the German Reich, this deficit was made up by both the RAF and the American air forces. The Royal Air Force's first tactical air fleet was the Desert Air Force (DAF). This unit, made up of various fighter and bomber detachments, developed important methods that were pioneering for later tactical air fleets, such as the use of forward air controllers.

On the American side, the 9th Air Force was formed on November 12, 1942, from the US Army Middle East Air Force (USAMEAF) in North Africa. Existing aircraft types were converted for use against ground troops in a tactical situation, attack patterns were tested and the conditions were created for the emergence of specialized tactical air fleets.

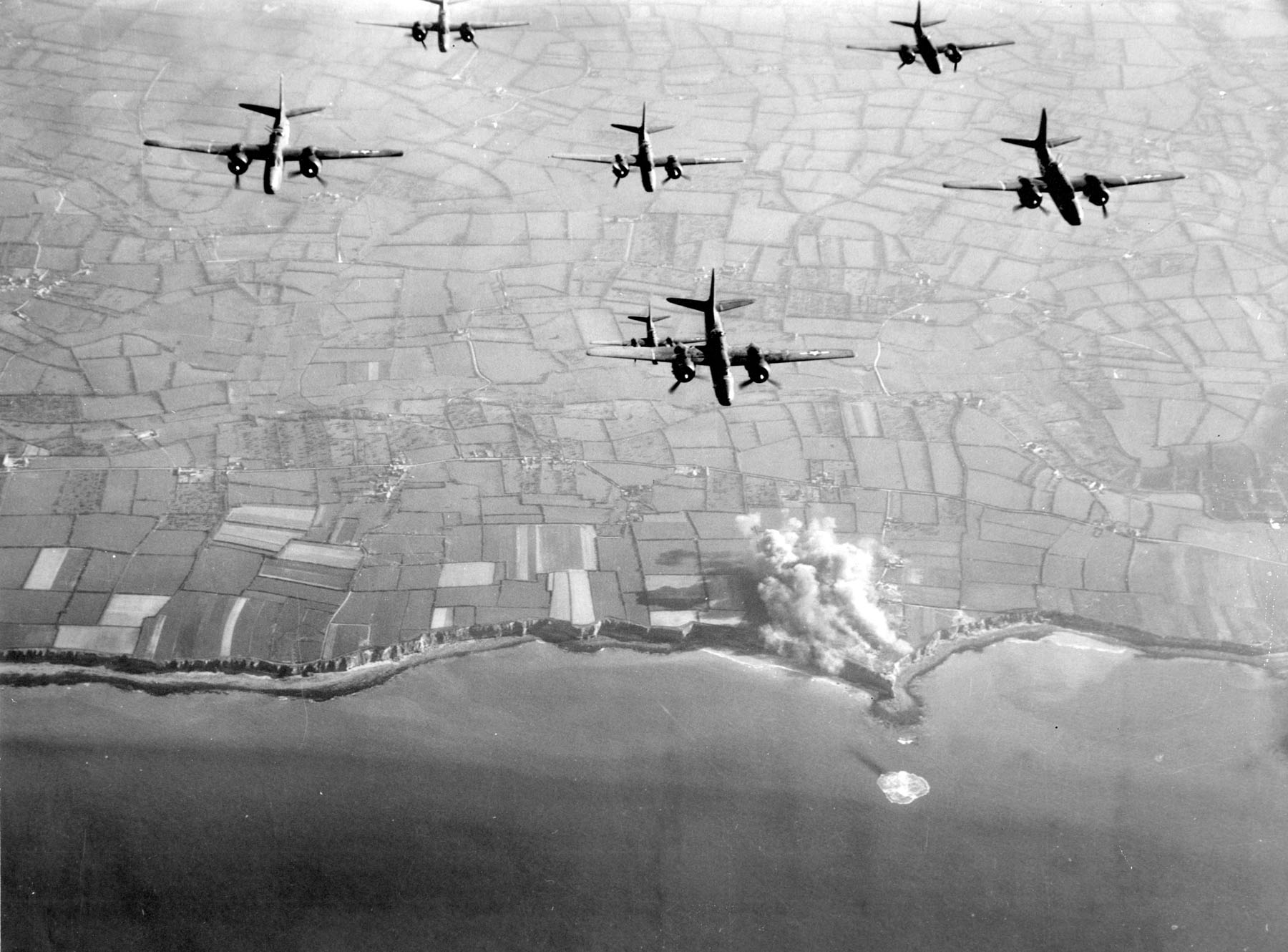
Medium bombers of the 9th Air Force bomb the Pointe du Hoc before the invasion.

==== Die 2nd Tactical Air Force der Briten und die 9th Air Force der Amerikaner ====
When the Afrika Korps was defeated in 1943, the tactical units were transferred to England and combined into two large air fleets, the British Second Tactical Air Force (2nd TAF) and the American 9th Air Force.

Both air fleets were geared towards the circumstances of a planned invasion and accompanied the Allied ground forces from the Normandy landings until the end of the war. The equipment was later supplemented by new aircraft types and special munitions, such as the Hawker Typhoon, equipped with unguided air-to-ground missiles for fighting tanks.

On June 6, 1944, the 2nd Tactical Air Force and the 9th Air Force together had approximately 2,600 aircraft, including fighters, fighter-bombers, light and medium bombers, reconnaissance aircraft and artillery observers.

==== Strategic air fleets ====
- Royal Air Force Bomber Command (Strategic Bomber Command of the Royal Air Force, Commander-in-Chief Arthur Harris) consisted of 82 squadrons with a total of 1,681 aircraft on June 6, 1944.
- 8th Air Force, under the command of the United States Strategic Air Force (USSTAF) and its commander-in-chief General Carl Spaatz since February 22, 1944. The air force, known in German as the 8th US Air Fleet and in American military jargon as the "Mighty Eighth", was the largest of all the air fleets involved. It consisted of over 2,800 aircraft and also had large escort fighter units.

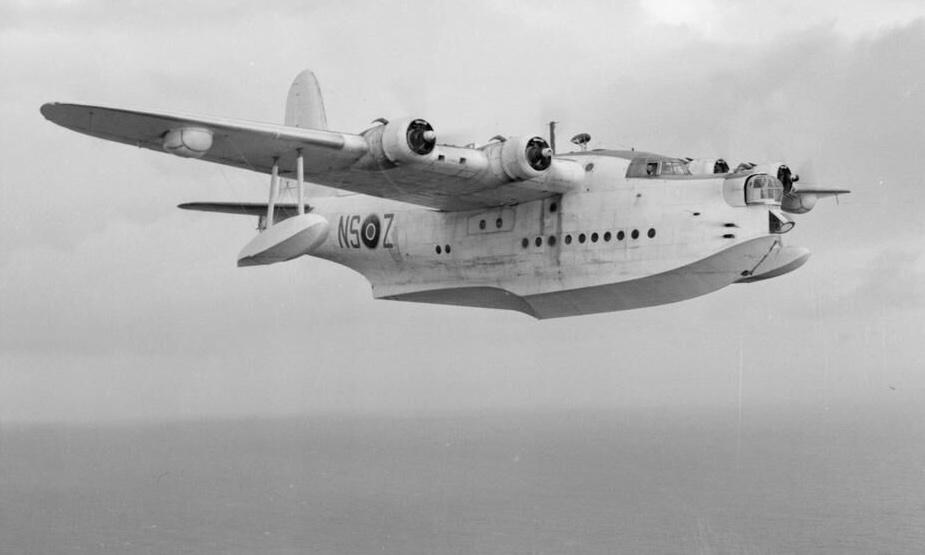
Short Sunderland Mk.V, im Einsatz als U-Boot-Jäger des Coastal Command

==== Royal Air Force Coastal Command (Küstenkommando) ====
16th and 19th Group with a total of 63 squadrons, which together comprised 678 operational aircraft on June 6, 549 of which were from Royal Air Force units. The main task was to carry out Operation Cork. In addition, the Allied naval forces were supported in the defense against speedboats and other light surface vessels and supply lines on the coast were attacked.

==== Air Defence of Great Britain (ADGB) ====
The 10th, 11th, 12th and 13th Groups, with a total of 45 squadrons, were assigned to defend the British Isles. Some of these units were also assigned to the 2nd Tactical Air Force at short notice and took part in a variety of operations that went far beyond the defense of British airspace.

=== Defense plan of the German Air Force ===
==== The role of the air force ====
After the winter of the war in 1943/44, there was a crisis of confidence between Hermann Göring, Commander-in-Chief of the Luftwaffe, and Hitler. Göring, Hitler's closest confidant since the failed putsch in 1923, had made several empty promises during the war. In 1940, for example, he wanted to destroy the British Expeditionary Force in Dunkirk using the Luftwaffe, but managed to successfully evacuate almost 340,000 Allied soldiers. In August 1940, he wanted to bring down the Royal Air Force within four days, but failed in the Battle of Britain. His promise to supply the trapped 6th Army in Stalingrad from the air over the winter of 1942-43 failed. Göring had even claimed to be able to completely protect the Reich's territory from Allied air attacks.

The hope for strong land forces and Göring's capital miscalculations meant that Hitler did not entrust the defense of the possible invasion beaches to the Luftwaffe. Instead, he chose General Field Marshal Erwin Rommel, a commander with extensive experience in ground combat against Allied troops.

Hitler intended to direct the deployment of the Luftwaffe himself, in particular the use of "Blitzbombers" to combat landed Allied troops. The actual activity of the Luftwaffe was limited to individual night raids as part of Operation Steinbock, such as on April 29, 1944, against Portsmouth with 100 bombers. Together with the use of V-weapons, this formed the so-called long-range offensive.

Bomb loads dropped over England:

- 1943: 2,298 tons
- 1944: 9,151 tons (including V-weapons)

The defensive precautions were limited to the transfer of several air defense batteries from the Reich territory to the Atlantic coast. The Wehrmacht High Command wanted to "wait until the last moment" before transferring airborne units.

The scenarios considered by the High Command of the Wehrmacht concentrated on field battles against airborne troops and army units of the Allied invasion force. Aspects of air warfare in this context were neglected. General Field Marshal Erwin Rommel, who inspected the defenses of the future Western Front, stated that an invading army had to be repulsed by the defenders before the bridgehead was formed. Rommel himself concentrated on the provision of armored units and the expansion of defensive installations. How to counter the enemy's air superiority remained an open question.

From April onwards, the military conditions for an invasion on the Allied side were regarded as given by the High Command of the Wehrmacht. Any delay in the attack was seen as an advantage for the defenders, as they could use the time to deploy additional army units and expand their defenses. Although it was recognized that the reason for the delay may have had to do with the air weather situation, no steps were taken to ensure air superiority over the possible combat areas.

==== Units available at the time of the Allied invasion ====
On June 6, 1944, apart from the 39 obsolete Junkers Ju 88s of Zerstörergeschwader 1 (ZG 1), only the two permanently stationed Jagdgeschwader 2 (JG 2 "Richthofen") and Jagdgeschwader 26 (JG 26 "Schlageter") were intended to defend the Channel coast by day. The number of operational aircraft of the two squadrons amounted to 119, which corresponds to an operational readiness of less than 50%.

In addition, a total of 154 horizontal bombers from various fighter squadrons and 36 fighter-bombers from Schlachtgeschwader 4 (SG 4) were within range of the combat area.

== Allied operations before D-Day ==
=== Reconnaissance flights ===
In order to better coordinate the landing on the beaches, the bombardment and also the bombardment of ships, the Allies flew regular reconnaissance flights over Normandy. However, to ensure that the Allied reconnaissance flights did not give away the invasion area, the Allies flew three missions over the Pas-de-Calais, while they flew one over Normandy.

=== Transportation Plan ===
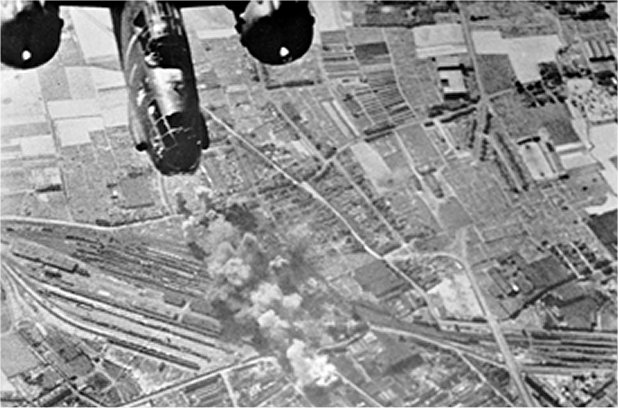
Boston-Bomber der 2nd Tactical Air Force über den Eisenbahnanlagen von Tourcoing, Mai 1944

The "Transportation Plan" was a strategic plan drawn up by Professor Solly Zuckerman, an advisor to the Air Ministry during the Second World War.

The idea was that the destruction of all transportation facilities in occupied France would be the best way to prevent the German Wehrmacht from repelling the invasion. This meant destroying the French railroad junctions, shunting yards and maintenance depots. There was criticism of this plan from Arthur Harris and Carl Spaatz, the commanders of the bomber units, among others. A competing plan was the Oil Plan.

The plan was nevertheless approved, and in April 1944 Charles Portal issued direct orders to attack the railroad facilities in Trappes, Aulnoye, Le Mans, Amiens, Longueau, Courtrai and Laon. At the beginning of June, 1,500 of the 2,000 steam locomotives in France were inoperable due to the air raids during the Transportation Plan.

Eisenhower wrote to Marshall and Roosevelt:

I consider the Transport Plan as indispensable to the preparations to Overlord. There is no other way this tremendous Air Force can help us, during the preparatory period, to get ashore and stay there.

=== Operation Cork ===
The aim of Operation Cork was to prevent the breakthrough of German U-boats from the Bay of Biscay or the Atlantic to the landing areas and the Channel coast. To this end, the sea area between southern Ireland, Cornwall and the Brest peninsula was patrolled by U-boat hunters by day and night. Within two weeks of the start of the invasion, 20 submarines were sunk and several more damaged. Six out of seven German Kriegsmarine destroyers moored in Brest or Le Havre were disabled and numerous speedboats were sunk.

== D-Day (June 6) ==
=== Air landings ===
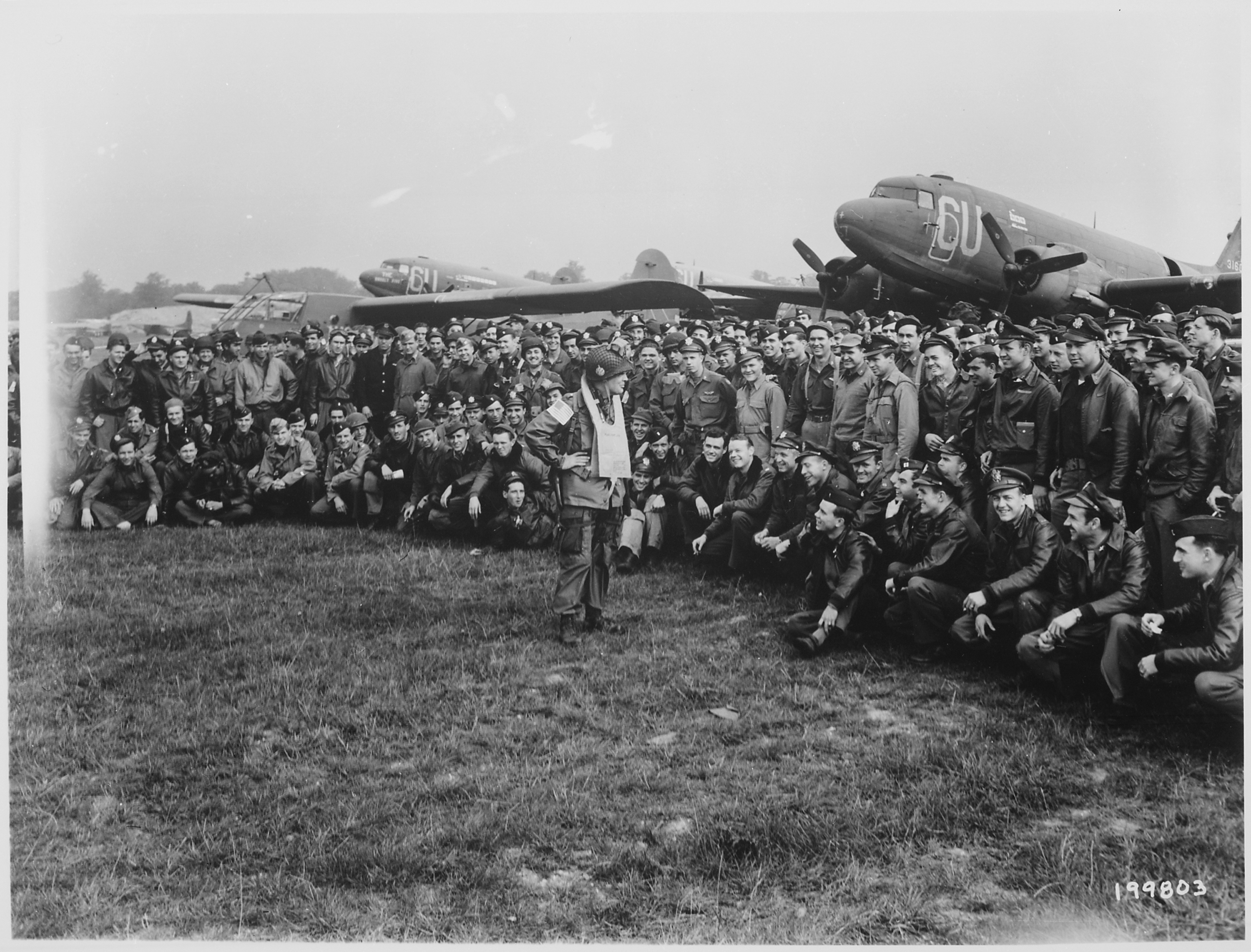
Brigadier General Anthony C. McAuliffe briefs the 101st US Airborne Division one day before D-Day. Two C-47 transport planes in the background and a cargo glider somewhat obscured in front of them.

Shortly after midnight, the British 6th Airborne Division landed on the eastern flank of the invasion landing area north of Caen and east of the Orne. A fleet of 606 four-engine transport aircraft and 327 cargo gliders were deployed for this purpose. The precision in reaching the planned "drop zones" (DZ) was remarkable; Leigh-Mallory described the operation as the greatest navigational achievement of the war to date. By four o'clock in the morning, all operational objectives of the airborne division, which included securing two bridges, had been achieved.

On the western flank of the landing area, the situation was completely different. The 338 Douglas DC-3/C-47 transports and the 229 cargo gliders that were to take the 82nd US Airborne Division to its "jump zone" in the center of the peninsula came under heavy anti-aircraft fire over the coast. 23 C-47s and two cargo gliders were shot down, and many were forced off by evasive maneuvers. In addition, there was a strong tailwind, which meant that the parachutists and cargo gliders landed between five and 40 kilometers away from their "jump zone". Nevertheless, smaller groups were able to come together and carry out their tactical tasks, as the confusion among the German defenders was great. By the second day after the invasion, only 2,000 of the 6,000 detached troops were reunited with their unit.

The 101st US Airborne Division fared no better than the 82nd US Airborne Division. These highly dispersed units, which were brought to their destination by 443 C-47s and 82 cargo gliders, were also able to fulfill their mission, which included capturing the small town of Sainte-Mère-Église.

The three airborne divisions suffered combined losses of more than 3,000 men in the first three days of the invasion.

=== Support for landings and deployment of heavy bombers ===
Between three and five o'clock in the morning, over a thousand British Halifax bombers from Bomber Command attacked 26 selected coastal batteries and other fortified positions along the French Atlantic coast. From the 8th Air Force, 2,600 heavy bombers took part in the widely dispersed attacks. Although little could be seen from the landing zones, all but two of the selected coastal batteries were destroyed. A total of 25 aircraft from both strategic air fleets were lost.

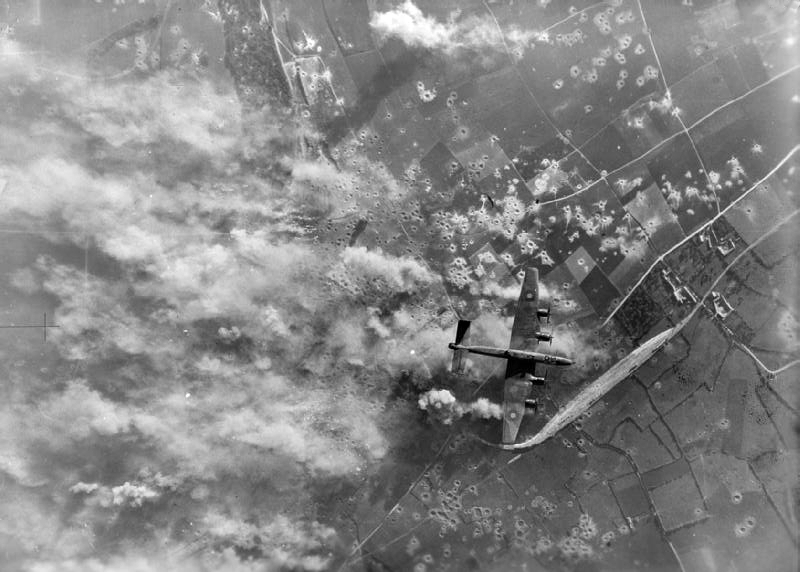
Britischer Luftangriff mit «Handley Page Halifax»-Bombern auf den V3-Bunker in Mimoyecques (Frankreich)

Eisenhower already said in his D-Day speech:

"Don't worry about the planes overhead. They will be our own."

The use of strategic bombers for tactical purposes before and during the invasion was sometimes criticized by the commanders of the bomber fleets. Arthur Harris, commander of the British Bomber Command, considered an intensification of the strategic air war against the cities in the Reich's territory to be expedient for ending the war quickly. Carl Spaatz as commander-in-chief of the American strategic air fleets was in favor of an offensive against the oil reserves of the German Reich ("Oil Plan") instead of the Transportation Plan.

During the course of the invasion, however, Eisenhower ordered frequent aerial bombardments in preparation for a major offensive. This operation was successful, although many Allied soldiers were victims of inaccurate bombing.

=== Coastal patrols ===
During the first three days of the invasion, the airspace above the landing beaches was closely monitored. From the surface to 600 meters above sea level, the airspace was divided into a Western Assault Area (WAA) and an Eastern Assault Area (EAA). Three squadrons each of the Royal Air Force or the Royal Canadian Air Force monitored the Western Assault Area and the Eastern Assault Area. The units were made up of units from the 2nd Tactical Air Force and the Air Defense of Great Britain. Above 600 meters above sea level, the airspace over the entire assault zone was monitored without interruption by three squadrons of the 9th Air Force.

For D-Day, two squadrons of aircraft were ordered to patrol the airspace at all times during the night. Care had to be taken to ensure that the Allied aircraft could be recognized as such, as the ship crews would shoot at any unknown aircraft.

On June 6 alone, 2,300 individual missions were flown by around 650 fighter planes to protect the attack zones over Normandy. All other tactical units were deployed directly against the coastal defenses and against supply lines in the hinterland in support of the landing troops.

=== German reactions and first air battles ===
Due to the surprise at the location of the invasion, the Germans did not respond with a major counterattack from the air. At the time of the landing on the morning of June 6, there were exactly two German aircraft, flown by Lieutenant Colonel Josef Priller and Sergeant Heinz Wodarczyk, which attacked the Allied landing troops (as depicted in the 1962 feature film "The Longest Day"). All other aircraft had been moved inland on June 4, as the previous airfields were considered too threatened.

The first air battle took place shortly before midday south of Caen, the last in the airspace over Évreux and Bernay at around 9 pm.

The losses of the Allied air forces that day amounted to 55 fighters and 11 medium bombers, as well as 41 troop transports and heavy bombers. Of the 55 fighter planes, 16 were lost in air combat, all the others due to flak or accidents.

The Luftwaffe lost 18 fighters and four medium bombers on D-Day, as well as 12 Ju 87 light bombers, which were on a transfer flight.

== The air war in the aftermath ==
=== June 7 - Day One after D-Day ===
==== Organized airfield construction ====
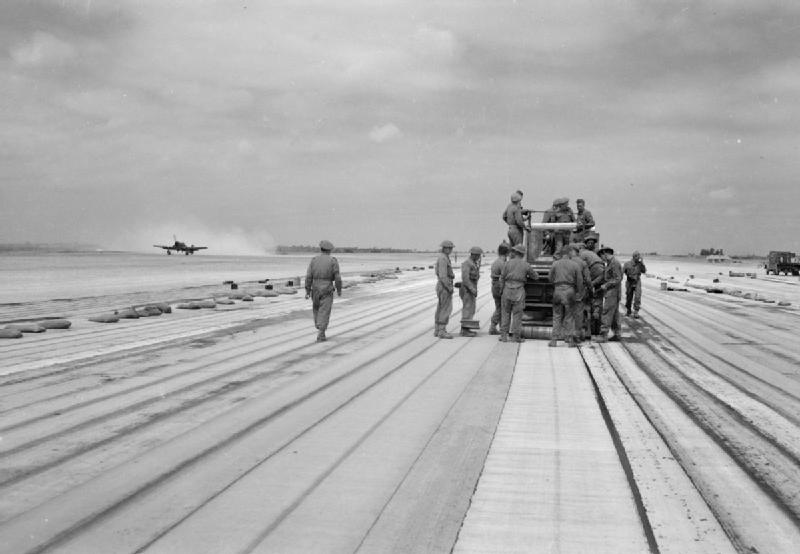
Construction of a field airfield

As early as the second day of the invasion, the Allies brought special units into Normandy that were tasked with the construction and defense of advanced landing grounds (ALGs). On the British side, these were so-called Service Command Units (SCUs). These special units were already deployed in North Africa from 1942 onwards.

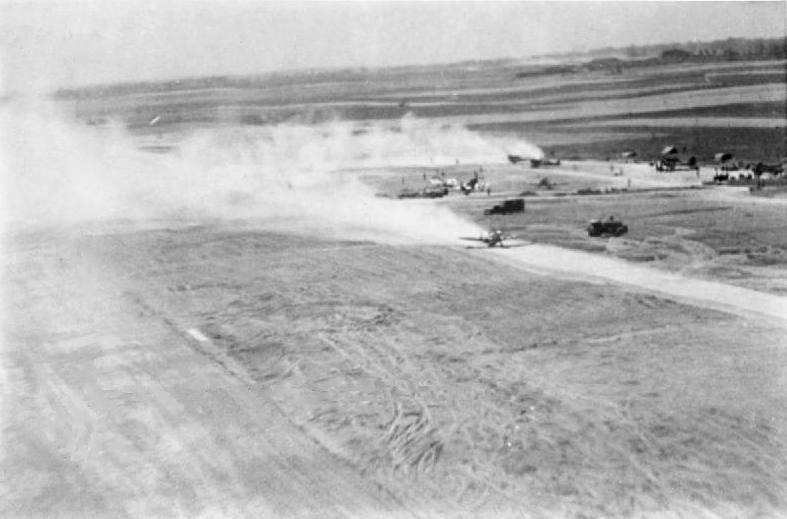
A Spitfire IX lands on ALG B.3 (St. Croix-sur-Mer) on June 12, 1944.

They brought trucks - loaded with tents, fuel, ammunition and anti-aircraft guns - to predetermined sections of terrain designated for the construction of forward airfields. Along with the Service Command Units came Airfield Construction Groups (ACGs), which were about 800 men strong and carried heavy equipment such as bulldozers, rollers and large rolls of mesh steel. They were able to quickly construct an airfield with the necessary electrical installations, crew quarters and communication facilities, while service command units secured the site. As soon as the flying unit had taken over the airfield with its infrastructure, the Service Command Units moved on and prepared for the construction of the next fully equipped airfield (= Advanced Landing Ground).

On June 7, two Airfield Construction Groups and four Service Command Units arrived with the landing troops; the first emergency runways were ready for operation on the same day. By June 10, four Advanced Landing Grounds had been completed; within a month, 25 had been completed.

The United States Army Air Forces brought Engineer Aviation Battalions to Normandy on June 9 as a combination of the aforementioned Service Command Units and Airfield Construction Groups. The designation was consecutive with "B" for the British and "A" for the American airfields, i.e. B.1, B.2, or A.1, A.2 etc.

The possibilities of tactical air warfare improved enormously for the Allies due to the short approach of the fighter-bombers from the Advanced Landing Grounds. This significantly increased the pressure and speed of the Allied advance.

==== The heaviest air battles of the Normandy campaign ====
The day after the invasion, all available fighter squadrons from the German Reich were brought to the invasion front. In addition, fighter-bomber squadrons were moved to the coast to fight the Allied landing fleet and its supply routes. While the number of individual missions by the Allied air forces was roughly the same as on the day of the invasion, the number of Luftwaffe missions doubled. The Allied losses on this day were the heaviest of the entire Normandy campaign, with 89 fighters and fighter-bombers lost. Of these, 16 were lost in air combat, but the majority were due to flak or accidents. The Luftwaffe lost 71 aircraft, 13 of which were Ju 88 medium bombers. With the loss of 160 aircraft on both sides in one day, June 7, 1944, ranks fourth among the heaviest air battles in history after July 7, 1943 (approx. 350 aircraft lost, Operation Citadel), August 18, 1940 (236 aircraft lost, 60 of which were destroyed on the ground, Battle of Britain) and August 19, 1942 (165 aircraft lost, Operation Jubilee).

=== June 10 - the RAF succeeds in bombing a German staff ===
On June 10, the command post of Panzergruppe West had been set up in an orchard near La Caine, 12 miles south of Caen. Here, General der Panzertruppen Freiherr Geyr von Schweppenburg [...] added the final touches of color to his plan for the great offensive that was to split the invasion front in two. Geyr had successfully led an armored corps in Russia, but had never faced an enemy that controlled the air, and he did not bother to camouflage his headquarters. Four large radio vans and several office vans and tents were parked outside.

— Chester Wilmot: Der Kampf um Europa, Zürich 1955.

The day before, the headquarters had been identified by intelligence and was subsequently confirmed by aerial reconnaissance. Late in the afternoon, 40 Typhoons and 61 B-25 Mitchell bombers "bombed the headquarters with such accuracy that little was left but the surprised and devastated commander-in-chief. According to an eyewitness report, 'all staff officers were killed or wounded and the radio cars and most other vehicles were destroyed. Only after 12 hours did the 7th Army learn of this catastrophe."

Geyr's chief of staff, General von Dawans, and 17 other staff officers were buried in a bomb crater. Wilmot remarks: "The Germans erected a huge polished oak cross with an eagle and swastika over it - a suitably impressive memorial, for this was the grave of Rommel's hopes of mounting a strong counter-attack before it was too late. The wounded Geyr and his shattered headquarters were brought back to Paris, and Dietrich again became supreme commander of the Caen sector. He immediately set aside Geyr's attack plans."

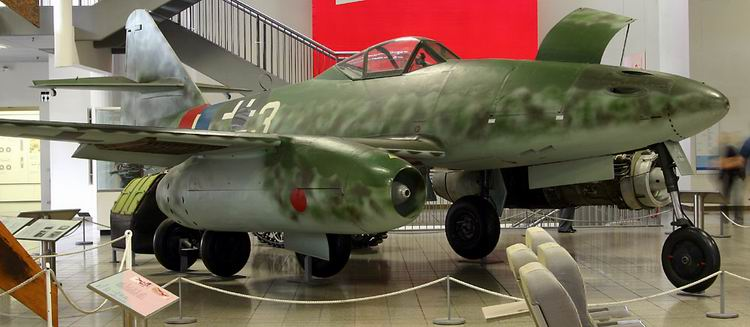
Me 262

=== Erste deutsche Düsenjäger kommen zu spät ===
At the time of the invasion, the Führer's orders forbade any discussion of whether the jet aircraft were to be used as fighters or bombers. During a demonstration of the Me 262 in Insterburg in December 1943, Hitler is said to have said to Göring and Adolf Galland: "In this aircraft, which you are presenting to me here as a fighter, I see the lightning bomber with which I will defeat the invasion in the first and weakest phase."

However, Hitler neglected to issue a Führer order for this decision and, above all, the conversion of the aircraft, which had been designed as a fighter, into a bomber. In April 1944, Hitler stated that the design had not been changed by then, that no devices for carrying bombs had been fitted and that the ongoing work related exclusively to the fighter version. From this point on, Hitler placed the project under his personal supervision. As a result, neither the bomber nor the fighter version was operational at the time of the invasion.

It was not until August 30 that the Chief of the General Staff of the Luftwaffe, General Kreipe, obtained the use of every twentieth Me 262 for testing purposes in the fighter sector. These aircraft could therefore not be used in the battle for Normandy.

=== Use of German "mistletoe teams" ===
In mid-June 1944, the Germans deployed several of their so-called Mistelgespanne aircraft to Normandy. These mistletoe teams consisted of an unmanned Junkers Ju 88, which instead of a cockpit carried a 2800 kilogram hollow charge with a distance fuse and was connected to a Messerschmitt Bf 109 via a strut. The pilot steered the Junkers from this Messerschmitt machine, then uncoupled his machine and flew back. The first such mistletoe formation, Kampfgeschwader 101, was deployed on the night of June 24–25. The unit's commodore, Captain Horst Rudat, flew four aircraft into the invasion area and, together with the other pilots in his unit, guided the aircraft loaded with explosives onto Allied ships. HMS Nith, a British frigate of the "River class", was severely damaged by the explosion of a Ju 88 hitting the water in the immediate vicinity. Nine of the crew members died, while 26 others were wounded. Following the damage, the HMS Nith was brought back to England to be repaired.

=== Deployment of the Allied air forces in the Battle of Caen ===
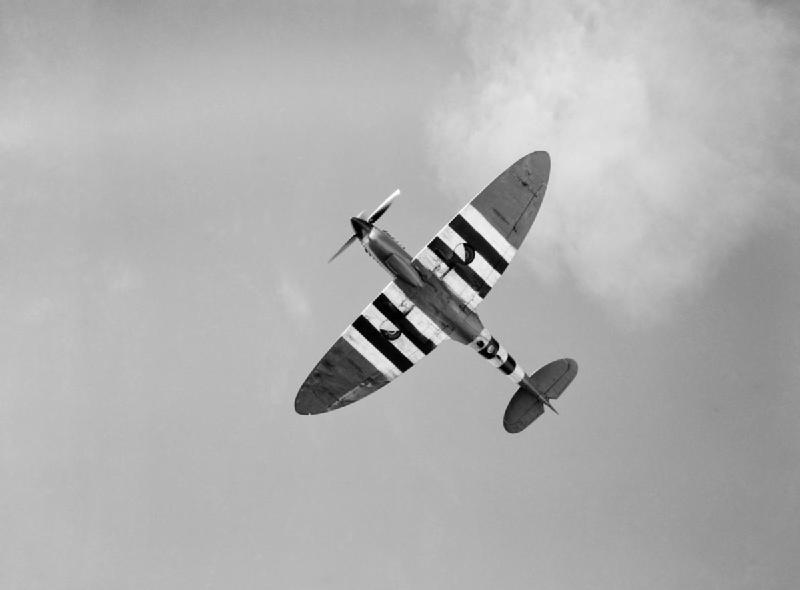
A Spitfire photo reconnaissance aircraft with "invasion stripes" to reliably distinguish it from German aircraft, July 1944

The Canadian 1st and British 2nd Armies, with around 115,000 men, were trapped in villages held by German formations north of Caen, which is why the Allies initially planned to fly a bomber attack on the villages on July 7, but then refrained from doing so due to the dangerous proximity to their own ground troops. As a result, the area to be bombed was moved further towards Caen. On the evening of July 7, 467 Allied aircraft flew to the target area in clear weather and dropped around 2276 bombs. The bombing did little damage to the German units, but more to the suburbs to the north of the city, most of which were destroyed, and to the French civilians, of whom around 3,000 died. After the Germans succeeded in shooting down an Allied aircraft with an anti-aircraft gun, three more later crashed over Allied airspace. In addition to the bombardment, naval artillery fired on the city from the beaches.

Alexander McKee said the following about the bombardment on July 7:

"The 2500 tons of bombs made no distinction whatsoever between friend and foe. If the British commanders believed that they could intimidate the Germans by killing the French, they were gravely mistaken."

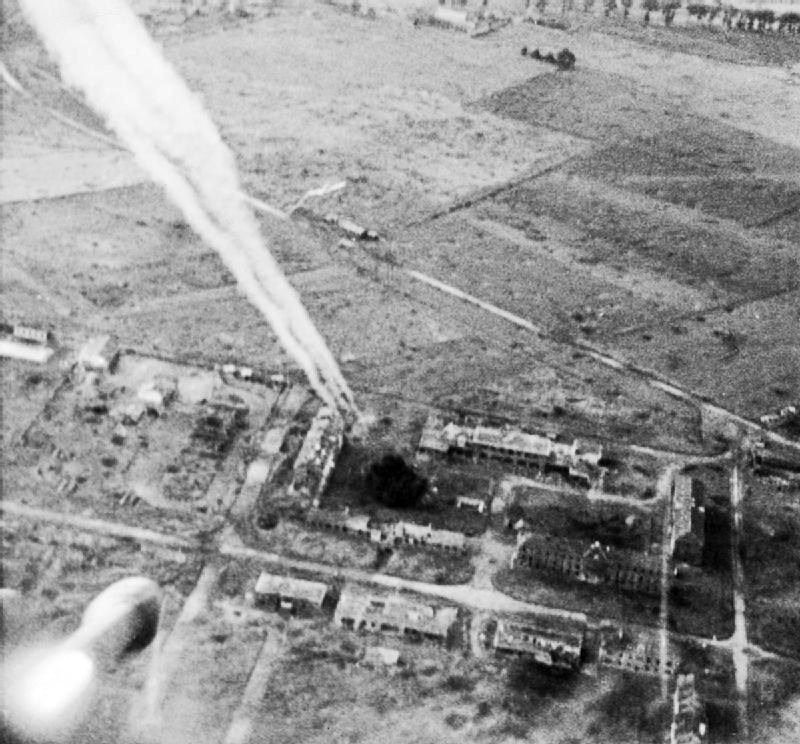
An air-to-ground missile is fired from a Typhoon of the 181st Squadron of the Royal Air Force over Carpiquet airfield.

When British and Canadian units set out to conquer Caen on July 8 (Battle of Caen), strategic bombers were again deployed in preparation. As on D-Day and before Operation Epsom, 800 Halifax bombers from Bomber Command laid a carpet of bombs behind the main battle line, the so-called "Bomb Line". In 40 minutes they dropped 3,000 tons of high-explosive bombs. Fighter-bombers from the 2nd TAF were then deployed to support the ground units and to screen the airspace against the Luftwaffe. By July 11, the districts northwest of the Orne up to the banks of the Orne had been captured. The German positions on the south-eastern bank were unreachable at this point, as all of the city's bridges had been destroyed.

The plan for Operation Overlord called for the immediate conquest of the area between Caen and Falaise, not least because this flat, extensive terrain was best suited for the construction of new airfields. On July 18, 1944, an Allied force of 942 aircraft, consisting of bombers and fighters, was therefore ordered to attack five villages in the area east of Caen in order to facilitate Operation Goodwood for the British 2nd Army. The attacks took place at dusk on the morning of the day and in good weather conditions. Four of the targets were satisfactorily marked by scout planes, but for the fifth target the bomber crews had to find the target by other means. Supported by American bombers and fighters, the British planes dropped around 6,800 tons of bombs over the villages and the surrounding area. Two German units, the 16th Field Division (L) and the 21st Panzer Division, were hit very hard by the bombing compared to the rest of the German units. A total of six Allied aircraft were shot down by German anti-aircraft guns and other ground troops.

One Welsh soldier said of the bomber squadrons:

"The entire northern sky, as far as the eye could see, was filled with them [the bombers] - wave after wave, one on top of the other, stretching to the east and west, so that one thought it could go no further. Everyone had now left their vehicles and stared in amazement [at the sky] until the last wave of bombers had dropped their bombs and started their return flight. Then the guns began to finish off the bombers' work with an ever louder barrage."

British and Canadian units then crossed the Orne over bridges north-east of Caen, which had already been captured on D-Day. The 600 Allied tanks encountered fierce resistance from the German Wehrmacht, and 200 British tanks were lost on the first day of the operation. When the weather worsened on July 20, Operation Goodwood came to a standstill.

=== "Friendly Fire" during Operation Cobra ===
The opening of the port of Cherbourg led to a large concentration of American troops in the area west of Caen. On July 23, they were to launch a major attack southwards near Saint-Lô, which was to initiate Operation Cobra. This attack had to be postponed until July 24 due to the storm that had already brought Operation Goodwood to a standstill. On this day, bombers from the 8th US Air Fleet were to prepare for the attack and attack targets near Saint-Lô, but the majority of the bombers were recalled due to unsuitable weather conditions. Nevertheless, 350 bombers dropped their bombs under difficult meteorological conditions. There were misses on the Allied side of the bomb line. The Allied airfield A.5 (Chipelle) was hit, as were parts of the 30th US Infantry Division.

The attack by the ground units was therefore delayed for another day, until July 25 at 11 am. This time, medium bombers from the 9th Air Force were supposed to support the attack, but once again they missed their own units. Within two days of Operation Cobra, the 30th US Infantry Division had suffered 700 casualties from friendly fire. Nevertheless, Operation Cobra was a great success and led to the formation of the Falaise pocket.

=== German aerial reconnaissance and the Arado Ar 234 jet aircraft ===
On the morning of August 2, 1944, German Lieutenant Erich Sommer took off from Juvincourt near Paris in a prototype of the jet-powered Arado Ar 234 bomber and reconnaissance aircraft.It flew at an altitude of 9,200 to 10,000 meters (sources vary here) at a speed of around 740 kilometers per hour and collected more information and photos about the Allied beachhead during its 90-minute flight than the conventional reconnaissance aircraft of the German Luftwaffe had in the previous eight weeks, flying over the beachhead from one end to the other. In the period that followed, crews of the Arado aircraft flew regular reconnaissance flights, but this had no further influence on the course of the war, as the Allies had already established a permanent base in France.

=== Allied defense against the German counterattack on August 7 ===
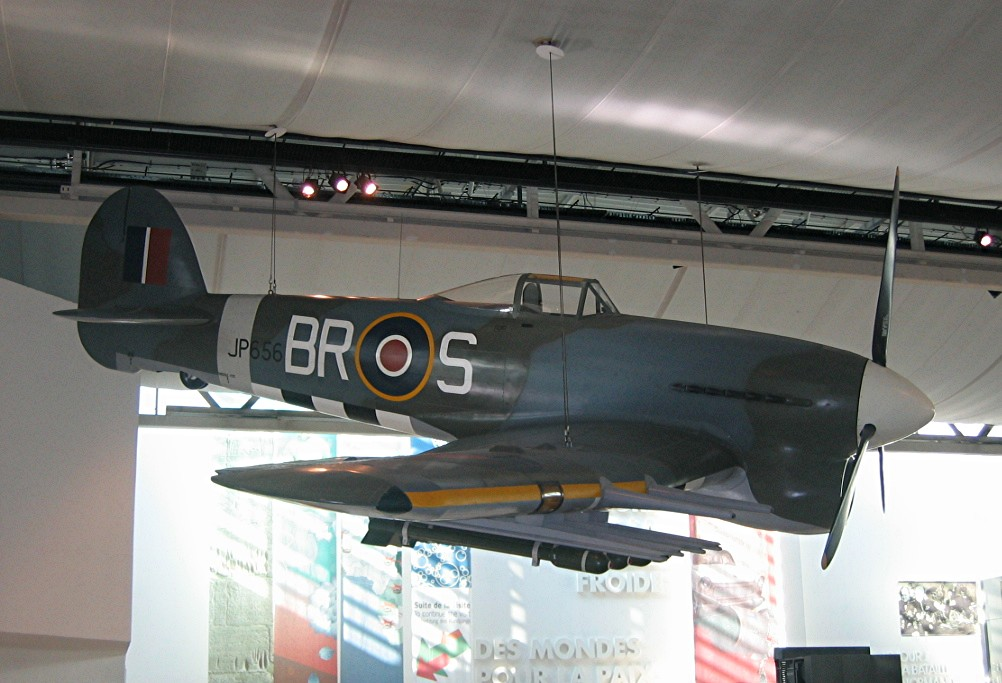
Hawker Typhoon with missile armament, suspended in the so-called Memorial de la Paix in Caen

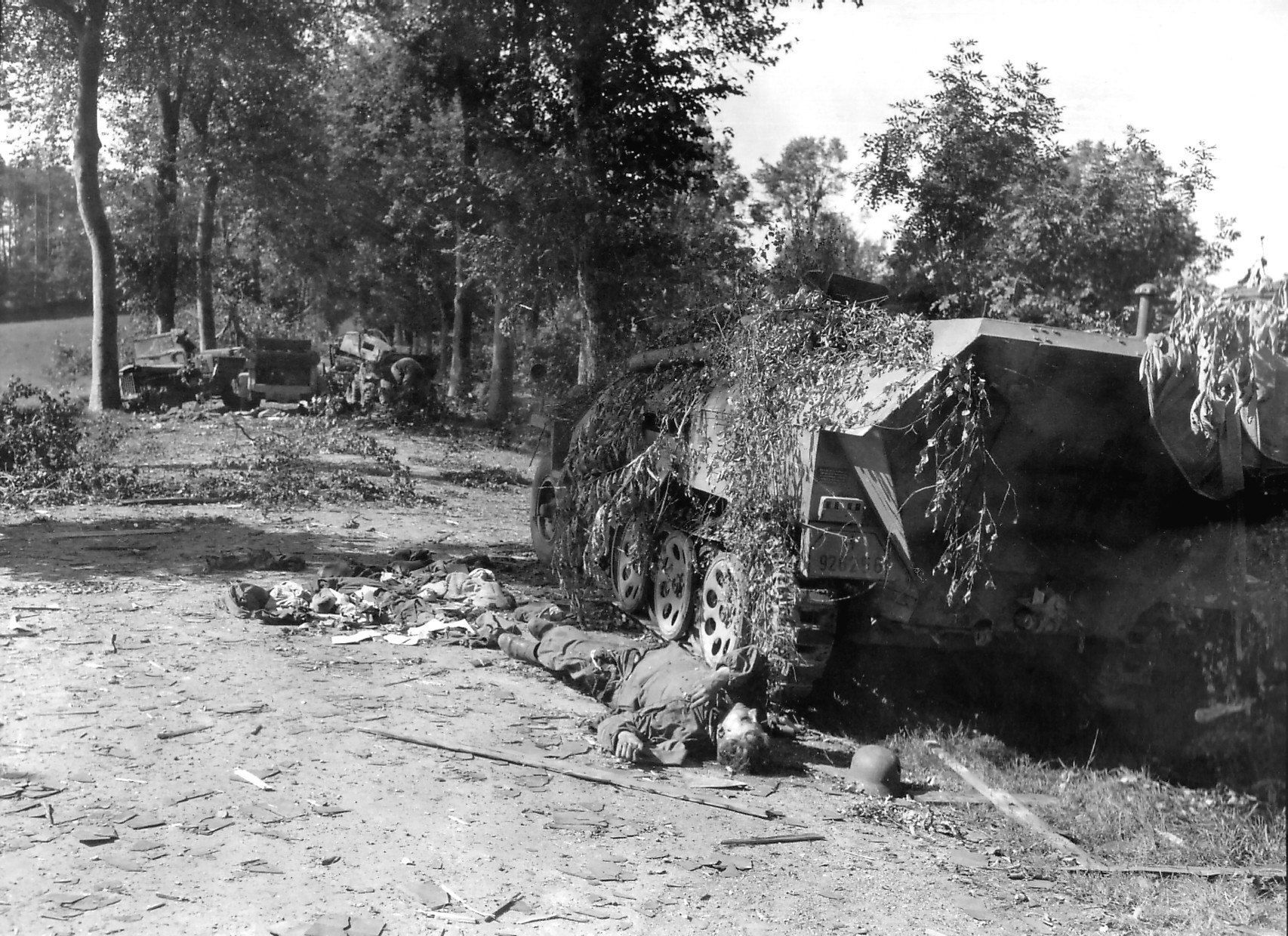
Destroyed German armored personnel carrier and casualties from British Hawker Typhoon air raids

The rapid advance of the American and British units from Saint-Lô to Avranches opened up the possibility of a counterattack for the defenders. Parts of the 15th German Army, which had until then been held back at the Pas-de-Calais, and parts of the 7th German Army launched a major attack from Mortain to the west during the night of August 6–7 in order to press in the Allied flank and subsequently encircle large Allied formations. For this attack, known as Operation Liège, 300 fighter planes from German airfields around Paris were to counter the Allied air raids.

The large-scale attack was recognized early on by the Allied leadership and the tank units at Avranches were reinforced by two additional American divisions. The Allied air force command determined that the Typhoon fighter-bombers of the 2nd Tactical Air Force should be directed exclusively against the advancing German tanks, while the fighters of the 2nd Tactical Air Force, the 9th Air Force and the 8th Air Force established a defensive corridor against German fighters.

A missile is fired by a Hawker Typhoon of the 181st Squadron of the RAF at a German motorized troop unit trying to escape from the Falaise cauldron.

By August 7, the German counterattack was making good progress, ground fog favored the attack and prevented the Typhoons from being used. The 30th US Infantry Division was encircled by the German armored units on a hill near Mortain. But at midday on August 7, the fog lifted and excellent flying weather set in. Now, for the first time in this conflict, the fighter-bombers of the 2nd Tactical Air Force encountered a concentration of over 250 tanks and armored vehicles. After fierce and costly fighting, the German fighter planes were finally forced off the battlefield. This allowed the Typhoons to attack the German armored units unhindered with rockets and on-board weapons. In the process, they destroyed around two thirds of the tanks. Company Liège had thus failed.

An examination of the wreckage on the battlefield by the Royal Air Force later revealed that more vehicles had been evacuated prematurely by their crews than had been destroyed. Of the vehicles that were destroyed, more were the result of anti-tank guns than air-to-ground missiles. From this it was concluded that the demoralizing effect of approaching Typhoons was similar to that of the German Junkers Ju 87 dive bomber.

To pay special tribute to the Typhoon pilots' achievements, a Typhoon memorial was erected in Noyers-Bocage, with the names of the 151 Typhoon pilots killed between May and August 1944 carved in black marble.

=== Use of German retaliatory weapons ===
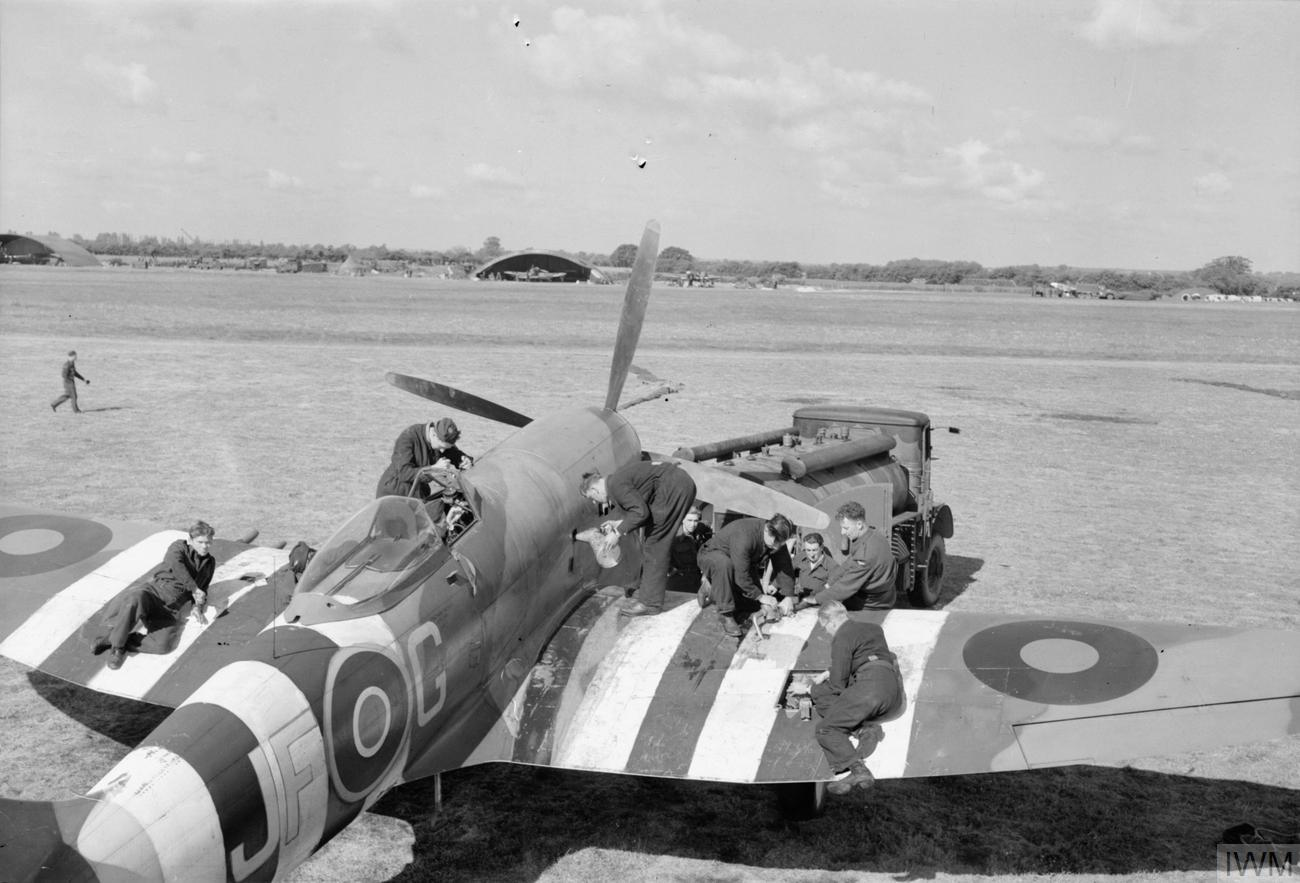
A Hawker Tempest of the 2nd Tactical Air Force is being prepared in England to defend against the V1, June 12, 1944.

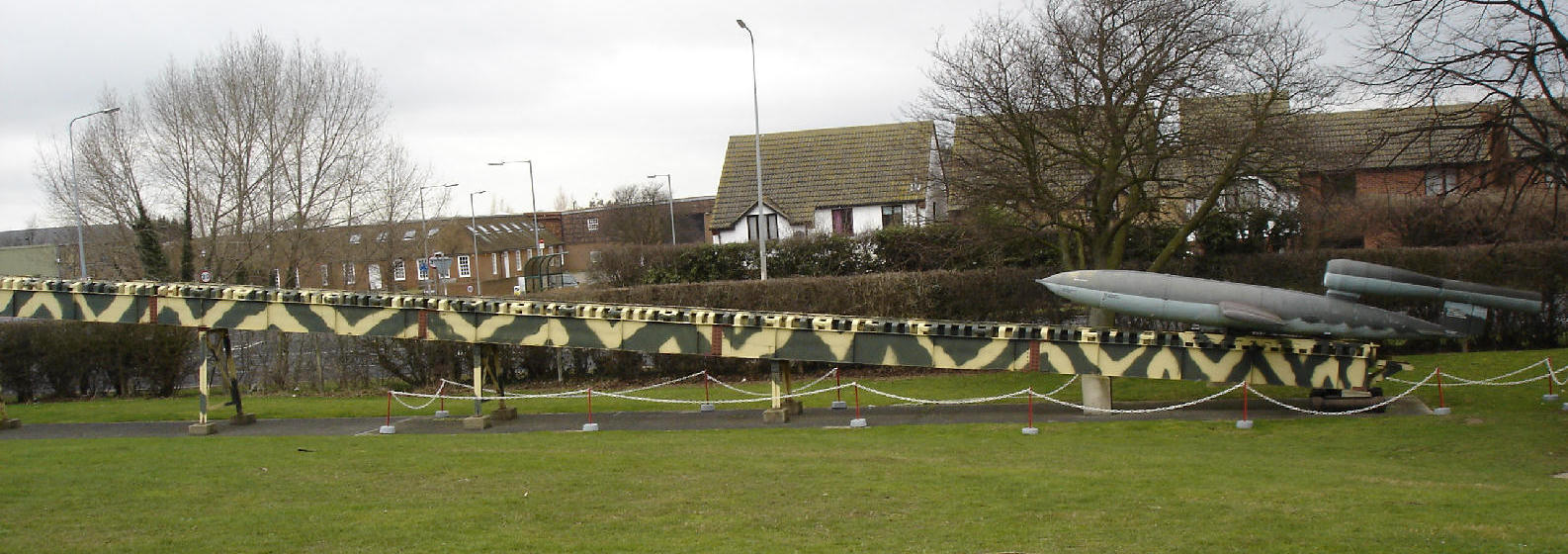
V1 on the launch pad at the Duxford Museum in England

The aircraft-like V1, developed at the Luftwaffe's Peenemünde-West test site, was first used against London from launch sites on the Channel coast on the night of June 12–13, 1944. By the time the launching sites ("Schleudern") were captured on September 6, 1944, around 8,000 V1s had been fired, 29% of which hit their target. The fast Hawker Tempests were mainly used for defense. The use of V1s against London resulted in the deaths of 6,184 civilians and a further 17,981 were seriously injured.

A main launch pad was planned in Saint-Omer for the V2, which flew at supersonic speed, but this could not be put into operation due to ongoing air raids and the conquest by invasion troops. On September 8, 1944, a V2 was launched from a mobile launch pad for the first time; the rocket was last launched from Dutch islands. By the last launch on March 27, 1945, 2,724 people had been killed and 6,467 seriously injured by V2 rockets. Hitler's expectation that this weapon would demoralize the British population was not fulfilled. However, the will to defeat Germany was strengthened.

=== August 26/27 - German air raid on Paris ===
After the liberation of Paris on August 25, 1944, 50 German fighter planes from Air Fleet 3 (Colonel General Deßloch) stationed in Reims dropped bombs over the French capital on the night of August 26–27. Almost 600 houses went up in flames. The bombing killed 213 people and wounded 914 others.

== Consequences ==
From June 6 to June 30, 1944, the Allied air forces lost 1284 aircraft, mainly to flak. A total of 158,000 individual missions were flown during this period.

By the time the Falaise pocket was broken up at the end of August 1944, Allied losses had risen to 4,099 aircraft and 16,674 airmen. Of the aircraft lost, 1,639 belonged to the fighter, fighter-bomber or medium bomber class. In contrast, the German Air Force alone lost 1522 fighter aircraft. The loss ratio for fighter aircraft in direct air combat was 3:1 in favor of the Allies; two out of three Allied fighters and fighter-bombers shot down were victims of German and, to a lesser extent, Allied anti-aircraft guns. The loss rate of the fighter aircraft can be explained by the fact that the German fighters mainly attacked the Allied bomber units and were in turn attacked by the escorts. The loss rate per mission was six times higher for the German Luftwaffe than for the Allies.

While the Allies were able to replace their material losses via intact supply routes, the German Luftwaffe's losses were largely irreplaceable.

== Literature ==
- David Clark: Angels Eight: Normandy Air War Diary. Bloomington 1st Books, 2003, ISBN 1-4107-2241-4
- Percy E. Schramm (Hrsg.): Kriegstagebuch des Oberkommandos der Wehrmacht 1944–1945. Teilband 1, ISBN 3-7637-5933-6
- Tony Hall (Hrsg.): Operation „Overlord“, Motorbuch Verlag, 2004, ISBN 3-613-02407-1
