= Masters of the Air =

2024 American war drama miniseries

- Genre: War drama
- Created by: John Shiban; John Orloff
- Based on: Masters of the Air by Donald L. Miller
- Developed by: John Orloff
- Directed by: Cary Joji Fukunaga; Dee Rees; Anna Boden Ryan Fleck; Tim Van Patten
- Starring: Austin Butler; Callum Turner; Anthony Boyle; Barry Keoghan; Nikolai Kinski; Stephen Campbell Moore; Sawyer Spielberg; Isabel May; James Murray; Nate Mann; Laurie Davidson; Joanna Kulig; Louis Hofmann; Jamie Parker; Bel Powley; Sam Hazeldine; Josiah Cross; Branden Cook; Ncuti Gatwa; Jerry MacKinnon; Josh Dylan
- Narrated by: Anthony Boyle
- Theme music composer: Blake Neely
- Country of origin: United States
- Original language: English
- No. of episodes: 9

Production
- Executive producers: Gary Goetzman; Tom Hanks; Steven Spielberg
- Cinematography: Adam Arkapaw; Jac Fitzgerald; Richard Rutkowski; David Franco
- Editors: Mark Czyzewski; Carmen Morrow; Mark Sanger; Spencer Averick; Billy Rich
- Running time: 48–77 minutes
- Production companies: Amblin Television; Playtone; Apple Studios
- Budget: $250 million

Original release
- Network: Apple TV+
- Release: January 26 – March 15, 2024

Related
- Band of Brothers; The Pacific

Masters of the Air is a 2024 American war drama miniseries created by John Shiban and John Orloff for Apple TV+. It is based on the 2007 book of the same name by Donald L. Miller and follows the actions of the 100th Bomb Group, a Boeing B-17 Flying Fortress heavy bomber unit in the Eighth Air Force in eastern England during World War II. The series is the final of three companion piece miniseries, following Band of Brothers (2001) and The Pacific (2010), and is the only one not to air on HBO. It is the first series to be produced by Apple Studios in cooperation with Playtone and Amblin Television and stars Austin Butler, Callum Turner and Anthony Boyle as part of an ensemble cast. The series consists of nine episodes.

Principal photography began in England in 2021 but was delayed on several occasions due to strict government measures related to COVID-19. Masters of the Air premiered on January 26, 2024 and received positive reviews, with many highlighting the performances, rich characters, and gripping action sequences. It received three nominations at the 76th Primetime Creative Arts Emmy Awards, winning one.

== Premise ==
Masters of the Air recounts the story of the 100th Bomb Group during World War II and follows bomber crews on dangerous missions to destroy targets inside German-occupied Europe.

The show portrays the intensity of war, the dangers the airmen face, and the friendships and relationships they develop.

== Cast ==
=== Main ===
- Austin Butler as Maj. Gale "Buck" Cleven
- Callum Turner as Maj. John "Bucky" Egan
- Anthony Boyle as Lt. Harry Crosby
- Barry Keoghan as Lt. Curtis Biddick
- Nikolai Kinski as Col. Harold Huglin
- Stephen Campbell Moore as Maj. Marvin "Red" Bowman
- Sawyer Spielberg as Lt. Roy Frank Claytor
- Isabel May as Marjorie "Marge" Spencer
- James Murray as Col. Neil "Chick" Harding
- Nate Mann as Maj. Robert "Rosie" Rosenthal
- Laurie Davidson as Lt. Herbert Nash
- Joanna Kulig as Paulina
- Louis Hofmann as Lt. Ulrich Haussmann
- Jamie Parker as Dr. Huston
- Bel Powley as Sub. Alessandra "Sandra" Wesgate
- Sam Hazeldine as Col. Albert Clark
- Josiah Cross as 2nd Lt. Richard D. Macon
- Branden Cook as 2nd Lt. Alexander Jefferson
- Ncuti Gatwa as 2nd Lt. Robert Daniels
- Jerry MacKinnon as Col. Benjamin O. Davis Jr.
- Josh Dylan as Lt. George Niethammer

=== Recurring ===
- Darragh Cowley as Lt. Glenn Graham
- Matt Gavan as Lt. Charles Cruikshank
- Jonas Moore as Capt. Frank Murphy
- Jordan Coulson as Lt. Howard Hamilton
- Ben Radcliffe as Capt. John D. Brady
- David Shields as Major Everett Blakely
- Edward Ashley as Major Jack Kidd
- Raff Law as Sgt. Ken Lemmons
- Adam Long as Capt. Bernard DeMarco
- Elliot Warren as Lt. James Douglass
- Samuel Jordan as Sgt. John J. "Winks" Herrmann
- Kai Alexander as Sgt. William Quinn
- Harry Ames as Capt. August H. Gaspar
- Bailey Brook as Sgt. Charles K. Bailey
- Louis Greatorex as Capt. Joseph "Bubbles" Payne
- John Hopkins as Dr. Wendell "Smokey" Stover
- Nathen Solly as Lt. John Hoerr
- Theodore Bhat as Sgt. Clarence C. Hall
- Josh Bolt as Lt. Winifred "Pappy" Lewis
- Ian Dunnett Jnr as Lt. Ron Bailey
- Thomas Flynn as Col. Sam Barr
- James Frecheville as Major Bill Veal
- Jonathan Halliwell as Sgt. William J. DeBlasio
- Dean John-Wilson as Lt. Clifford Milburn
- Tom Joyner as Cpt. "Stormy" Becker
- Riley Neldam as Sgt. Michael V. Boccuzzi
- Adam Silver as Lt. David Solomon
- Ben Spong as Major Ollie Turner
- Spike White as Lt. Charles A. Via
- Nathan Collins as Lt. George Oliver

=== Guest ===
100th Bomb Group

- Daniel Briggs as Sgt. William Crabb
- Freddy Carter as Lt. David Friedkin
- James Meunier as Lt. Kenneth Lorch
- Kieron Moore as Sgt. Clifford Starkey
- Oaklee Pendergast as Sgt. William Hinton
- Francesco Piacentini-Smith as Sgt. Ray H. Robinson
- Dean Ridge as FO. Richard L. Snyder
- Sonny Ashbourne Serkis as Lt. James Evans
- George Smale as Lt. Raymond Nutting
- George Webster as Lt. Glenn W. Dye
- Ben Dilloway as Lt. Col. Bill Aring
- Luke Coughlan as Sgt. James M. Johnson
- Jon Ewart as Lt. William Couch
- Max Hastings as Lt. Kenneth Allen
- Nitai Levi as Sgt. Paul A. Vrabec, Jr.
- Fionn O'Shea as Sgt. Steve Bosser
- Neil Pendleton as Sgt. William Stewart
- Thomas Perry as Sgt. Harold E. Clanton
- Charlie Rix as Lt. Glen Van Noy
- Elliott Ross as Lt. Donald Strout
- Alex Boxall as Sgt. Monroe Thornton
- Elan Butler as Lt. Robert Shoens
- Lino Facioli as Lt. Adams
- Christopher Lakewood as Col Thomas Jeffery
- Dimitri Leonidas as Sgt. George J. Petrohelos
- Phillip Lewitski as Lt. Francis Harper
- Jojo Macari as Capt. Oran Petrich
- John Schwab as Lt. Col. James W. Lann
- Corin Silva as Lt. Col. John Bennett
- Louis Sparks as Sgt. Lester Saunders

Tuskegee Airmen

- Kwame Agyei as Lt. Joseph Evans Gordon
- Tomisin Ajani as Captain Erwin B. Lawrence
- Bradley Banton as Lieutenant Lee "Buddy" Archer
- Jonathan Jules as Lt. Shelby F. Westbrook
- Darryl Mundoma as Lt. Charles M. Bussey
- Francis Lovehall as Captain Wendell O. Pruitt
- Rahshan Wall as Lt. Frederick D. Funderburg

Other

- Nancy Farino as Lil, a barmaid at a pub frequented by the airmen
- Tommy Jessop as Tommy, a local whom Egan befriends
- Toby Eden as Billy Taylor, a boy who lives near the airfield, looked after by Lemmons
- Alfie Tempest as Sammy Hurley, a boy who lives near the airfield, looked after by Lemmons
- Harriet Leitch as Tatty Spaatz, a volunteer for the American Red Cross
- Emma Canning as Helen, a volunteer for the American Red Cross who makes a connection with Lt. Nash
- Ben Segers as Vincent, a Belgian resistance fighter aiding Quinn and Bailey in returning to England
- Vincent Londez as Jean Achten, a Belgian resistance fighter aiding Quinn and Bailey in returning to England
- Barney White as Bob, a German spy who attempts to blend in with Quinn and Bailey
- Bronwyn James as Susie, an attendee at Lt. Dye's celebration
- Lauren McQueen as Rose, a volunteer for the American Red Cross
- David Austin-Barnes as Stuart O'Neill, a POW at Stalag Luft III
- Robert Hands as Major Gustav Simoleit, Deputy Commandant at Stalag Luft III
- Saro Emirze as Hanns Scharff, a Luftwaffe interrogator
- Léonie Lojkine as Michou, a Resistance guide

== Episodes ==
No.	Title	Directed by	Written by	Original release date
1	"Part One"	Cary Joji Fukunaga	Teleplay by : John Orloff; Story by : John Shiban and John Orloff	January 26, 2024
In spring 1943, USAAF majors Gale Cleven and John Egan of the 100th Bombardment Group deploy to RAF Thorpe Abbotts to join the air campaign against Nazi Germany. In June, the 100th, comprising four squadrons of B-17s is sent on a daytime bombing mission to destroy military targets in Bremen, Germany. Despite the use of the advanced Norden bombsight, the bombardiers are unable to confirm the targets due to heavy cloud cover, and the mission is aborted. The 100th is forced to fly through heavy anti-aircraft fire, and is then attacked by Luftwaffe fighters. The failed mission results in the loss of three B-17s and thirty men, while the 100th commanding officer, Colonel Harold Huglin, is relieved of command due to illness.
2	"Part Two"	Cary Joji Fukunaga	John Orloff	January 26, 2024
The 100th copes with its first combat losses. At a pub, RAF members challenge the American tactic of daytime raids; feeling disrespected, Lieutenant Curtis Biddick defeats a British pilot in a bare-knuckle boxing match. The episode also focuses on the importance of the ground crew. Cleven is tasked with leading the 100th on their second mission: bombing German U-boat pens in Trondheim, Norway. Lieutenant Harry Crosby, despite airsickness, successfully navigates the mission. Biddick's B-17 is damaged; he makes a controlled landing without power in Scotland on somebody's farm. Following a raucous evening celebrating a successful mission, the 100th watch the German air raid on Norwich.
3	"Part Three"	Cary Joji Fukunaga	Teleplay by : John Orloff	February 2, 2024
In August 1943, the 100th participates in the Schweinfurt–Regensburg mission to destroy aircraft manufacturing plants deep within Germany before traveling to meet the Twelfth Air Force at the Telergma Airfield, Algeria. During the mission, Biddick and his co-pilot are killed when trying to make an emergency landing in a forest clearing. Sergeant Quinn parachutes to safety after his B-17 is destroyed; he lands in occupied Belgium and is met by Belgian Resistance members. The surviving members of the 100th arrive in Africa.
4	"Part Four"	Cary Joji Fukunaga	John Orloff	February 9, 2024
In October 1943, replacement B-17 crews, including Lieutenant Robert Rosenthal, arrive. The 100th bombs Bremen once again. Feeling the effects of combat exhaustion, Egan is sent on leave to London, where he has a one-night stand with a Polish war widow. Learning that Cleven did not return from Bremen, Egan returns to duty early. Meanwhile, Quinn is guided by the Belgian Resistance through an escape line. He meets two other American airmen, including Bob, who is shot after the Resistance claim he was a German spy. Quinn and the others arrive via train to occupied Paris on the way to Spain.
5	"Part Five"	Anna Boden & Ryan Fleck	John Orloff	February 16, 2024
The 100th returns from the Bremen mission after taking heavy casualties. Crosby replaces Captain Payne as the lead navigator and is promoted. Egan leads another bombing raid to Münster just days after the Bremen mission. The mission ends disastrously for the 100th after they are intercepted by swarms of Luftwaffe fighters. All but one B-17, piloted by Rosenthal, are shot down. Having bailed from his doomed plane, Egan parachutes alone into the German countryside of Westphalia.
6	"Part Six"	Anna Boden & Ryan Fleck	John Orloff	February 23, 2024
October 1943; Major Egan is taken prisoner and almost dies after he and other downed pilots are attacked by German civilians while being marched through a bombed town (based on the Rüsselsheim massacre). He is taken to Dulag Luft for interrogation before being transferred to Stalag Luft III. There, he meets other comrades from the 100th, including Cleven. After flying three high casualty missions in three days, Rosenthal and his crew are sent to a country estate for rest, which Rosenthal resists. Crosby attends an Allied conference at the University of Oxford where he meets a British ATS officer with whom he bonds before she is unexpectedly called away.
7	"Part Seven"	Dee Rees	John Orloff	March 1, 2024
In March 1944, the 100th loses fifteen B-17s and one-hundred-fifty men during a mission over Berlin. Their next attack proves more successful when the bombers are guarded by P-51 Mustang fighter squadrons. They are upset to learn that the number of missions required for a crew to be discharged is being increased from twenty-five to twenty-eight. Rosenthal completes his twenty-fifth mission, but decides to reenlist. He learns General Doolittle is planning to use the B-17 crews as bait to draw the Luftwaffe into the sky to face the P-51s; Rosenthal is placed in command of the 350th. Crosby begins an affair with ATS officer Wesgate. Quinn returns to base and is exempted from further missions due to his knowledge of the escape lines. In Stalag Luft III, Cleven and other prisoners of war build a crystal radio to tune into the BBC news. A large group of British prisoners escape but many are executed after recapture. The American officers are threatened that the camp will be turned over to the SS and Gestapo if there are further escape attempts.
8	"Part Eight"	Dee Rees	Teleplay by : John Orloff & Joel Anderson Thompson and Dee Rees; Story by : John Orloff and Joel Anderson Thompson & Morwenna Banks	March 8, 2024
In June 1944, Crosby conducts operational planning for two hundred bombing missions against Wehrmacht positions in occupied France in preparation for Operation Overlord. Working for three straight days, he passes out and sleeps through D-Day. During Operation Dragoon, the Tuskegee Airmen of the 332nd fighter group are downed attacking German positions at the Côte d'Azur; lieutenants Richard Macon, Robert Daniels, and Alexander Jefferson are transferred to Stalag Luft III, now under control of the SS. They are invited by Cleven to join with preparations for a potential breakout.
9	"Part Nine"	Tim Van Patten	Teleplay by : John Orloff & Joel Anderson Thompson; Story by : John Orloff	March 15, 2024
In February 1945, Rosenthal's plane is shot down over Berlin; he parachutes into no man's land and is rescued by the Red Army. The Germans evacuate Stalag Luft III, forcing the prisoners to march in freezing conditions; they are taken via train to Nuremberg before being interned at Stalag XIII. When they are again forced to march, Cleven and Egan try to escape, but only Cleven succeeds. Cleven survives an attack by Volkssturm children before encountering U.S. Army units. Egan and the other prisoners are taken to Stalag VII and are liberated soon after. In Poznań, Rosenthal enters Żabikowo prison camp where he sees the bodies of prisoners. Rosenthal speaks to a man who has lost his family in the Holocaust. Cleven, Egan, Rosenthal and Crosby reunite at Thorpe Abbotts; they participate in Operation Chowhound to supply food to the Dutch population stricken by the Hunger Winter. After the German surrender, the 100th departs for home. The series ends with a montage explaining the future lives of its central characters.

== Production ==
Emblem of the Eighth Air Force in World War II

In October 2012, there were reports of a third World War II miniseries, in the same vein as Band of Brothers and The Pacific, but focusing on United States Army Air Forces aircrews of the Eighth Air Force, that was being considered by Tom Hanks and Steven Spielberg. In January 2013, HBO confirmed that it was developing the miniseries, based on Donald L. Miller's book Masters of the Air: America's Bomber Boys Who Fought the Air War Against Nazi Germany, to be adapted by John Orloff. The series would focus on the 100th Bombardment Group of the Eighth Air Force.

In October 2019, it was reported that Apple had made a deal with Spielberg's and Hanks's respective production companies to stream the series exclusively on Apple TV+ instead of HBO. In a statement, HBO later confirmed that it had decided not to move forward with the series. The Hollywood Reporter said it would consist of nine episodes at a total cost of $250 million. The series is the first Apple TV+ series to go into production under the technology firm's in-house production company, Apple Studios.

In October 2020, Cary Joji Fukunaga was announced as director of the first three episodes. In February 2021, Austin Butler and Callum Turner were cast to star. Anthony Boyle and Nate Mann joined the cast in March, with Raff Law, James Murray and Tommy Jessop added in April. Freddy Carter revealed his casting in a May interview, while set photos revealed that Barry Keoghan was also cast. In June, Dee Rees was announced as directing episodes of the series. In July, Anna Boden and Ryan Fleck were also announced as directing episodes. Colleen Atwood served as costume designer.

In February 2021, it was reported that production had begun at Dalton Barracks (the former WWII airfield RAF Abingdon) in Oxfordshire, England. Retrospective temporary 12-month planning permission was applied for at Newland Park, Chalfont St Peter, following the construction of a WWII barracks on the site. Filming paused briefly in July due to positive COVID-19 tests. Production also occurred in Hemel Hempstead. The series used on-set virtual production by Lux Machina for cockpit scenes. Stephen Rosenbaum served as the visual effects supervisor for the miniseries. In total, 3,447 visual effects shots were used for the series. Over 1,600–2,000 visual effects shots were done by DNEG, including most of the aerial sequences.

== Release ==
Masters of the Air premiered on Apple TV+ on January 26, 2024.

=== The Bloody Hundredth ===
A companion documentary titled The Bloody Hundredth, narrated by Tom Hanks, tells the story of the 100th Bomb Group that inspired the stories in Masters of the Air. It was released on March 15, 2024, on Apple TV+.

== Reception ==
=== Critical response ===
On the review aggregator website Rotten Tomatoes, 85% of 100 critics' reviews are positive, with an average rating of 8/10. The website's consensus reads: "Soaring high with its immaculate production design and acutely well-observed characters, Masters of the Air can stand proud alongside its sibling series Band of Brothers and The Pacific." Metacritic assigned the series a weighted average score of 72 out of 100 based on 42 critics, indicating "generally favorable reviews".

Writing for The Guardian, Rebecca Nicholson gave the series five out of five, describing it as "truly fantastic television", portraying the experience of the pilots "as thrilling as it is terrible". However, in the i, Emily Baker rated the series two out of five, describing it as "the first big TV disappointment of 2024". Baker criticizes the predictable and "formulaic" drama, thin characterization, and storylines and suggests that the series is "too old-fashioned to compete with today's prestige TV". The Daily Telegraph also criticized the show, saying it "sacrificed authenticity for Hollywood clichés". Empire pointed out that it is all handled with "a certain strain of American exceptionalism" with non-Americans appearing as stereotypes, the British portrayed as "invariably stiff-upper-lipped" and "only a passing mention" for the RAF.

The series has been criticized regarding its accuracy, with many changes and omissions from the actual story of the 100th. The lack of a strategic narrative was also commented on: "the limited focus on strategy missed the opportunity to put the characters’ experience into context".

The quality of CGI for the aerial scenes was also criticized, including making the B-17s seem "cartoonish".

=== Accolades ===
Year	Ceremony	Category	Recipient	Result	Ref.
2024	76th Primetime Creative Arts Emmy Awards	Outstanding Original Main Title Theme Music	Blake Neely	Nominated	
2024	76th Primetime Creative Arts Emmy Awards	Outstanding Sound Editing for a Limited or Anthology Series, Movie or Special	Jack Whittaker, Michael Minkler, Jeff Sawyer, Luke Gibleon, Dave McMoyler, Michael Hertlein, Michele Perrone, Jim Brookshire, Bryan Parker, Zach Goheen, Paul B. Knox, Adam Kopald, Angela Claverie, Dylan Tuomy-Wilhoit, and Jeff Wilhoit (for "Part Five")	Nominated	
2024	76th Primetime Creative Arts Emmy Awards	Outstanding Sound Mixing for a Limited or Anthology Series or Movie	Michael Minkler, Duncan McRae, Tim Fraser, and Thor Fienberg (for "Part Five")	Won	
2025	30th Critics' Choice Awards	Best Limited Series	Masters of the Air	Nominated	
2025	23rd Visual Effects Society Awards	Outstanding Supporting Visual Effects in a Photoreal Episode	Stephen Rosenbaum, Bruce Franklin, Xavier Matia Bernasconi, David Andrews, Neil Corbould (for "Part Three")	Nominated	
2025	2025 British Academy Television Craft Awards	Best Production Design	Chris Seagers	Nominated	
2025	2025 British Academy Television Craft Awards	Best Special, Visual and Graphic Effects	Neil Corbould, Caimin Bourne, Stuart Heath, and Glen Winchester	Nominated	
