= Robert Rosenthal (USAAF officer) =

United States Army Air Forces officer

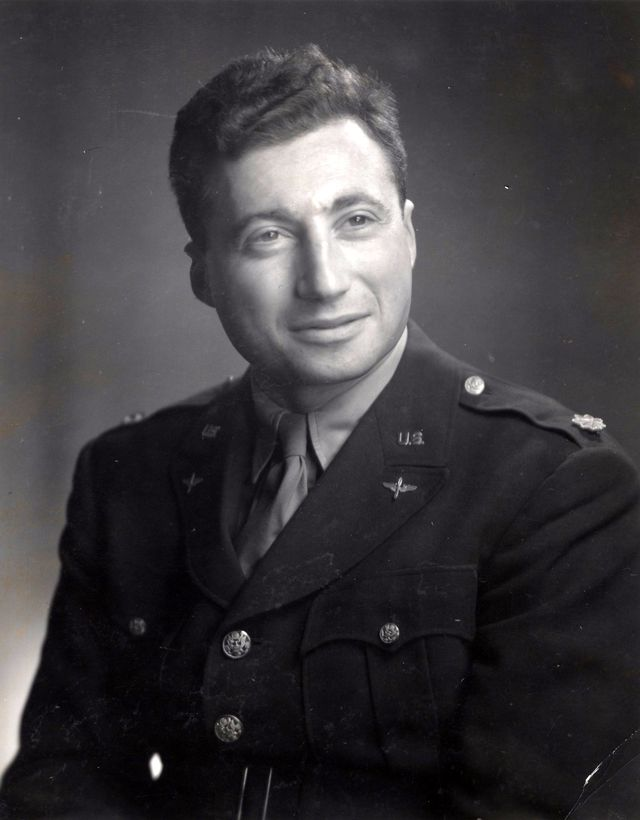
- Rosenthal in 1945
- Born: June 11, 1917; Brooklyn, New York, U.S.
- Died: April 20, 2007 (aged 89); White Plains, New York, U.S.
- Military career
- Allegiance: United States
- Branch: United States Army Air Forces
- Service years: 1942–1945
- Rank: Lieutenant Colonel
- Commands: 418th Bombardment Squadron; 350th Bombardment Squadron
- Conflicts: World War II
- Awards: Distinguished Service Cross; Silver Star (2); Distinguished Flying Cross (2); Purple Heart (2); Air Medal (8)

Lieutenant Colonel Robert Rosenthal (June 11, 1917 – April 20, 2007) was an American lawyer and Army officer. A highly decorated B-17 commander of the Eighth Air Force of the United States Army Air Forces in World War II, Rosenthal was a recipient of the Distinguished Service Cross and two Silver Stars. Although bomber crews were initially only required to complete 25 combat missions in a combat tour to earn the right to rotate home, Rosenthal flew a total of 52 missions and was shot down twice. After the war, Rosenthal served as an assistant to the U.S. prosecutor at the Nuremberg trials.

== Early life ==
Rosenthal was born to a Jewish family in Brooklyn, New York, and grew up in the Flatbush neighborhood. He was the captain of the baseball and football teams of Brooklyn College, graduating in 1938. He graduated from Brooklyn Law School summa cum laude, and had been working at a law firm in Manhattan when the Imperial Japanese Navy attacked Pearl Harbor on December 7, 1941.

== World War II ==
On January 2, 1942, Rosenthal enlisted in the United States Army as an aviation cadet. In September 1942, he graduated from the Air Corps Advanced Flying School at Moody Field, near Valdosta, Georgia, earning his wings and a commission as a second lieutenant. In September 1943, he completed Boeing B-17 Flying Fortress combat crew training at Dyersburg Army Air Base near Halls, Tennessee. He and his crew were immediately shipped overseas and joined the 418th Bombardment Squadron, 100th Bombardment Group, stationed at RAF Thorpe Abbotts in England.

On the October 10, 1943, mission over Münster, Germany, only the third mission for Rosenthal's crew with the 100th Bombardment Group, the B-17F s/n 42-6087, nicknamed Royal Flush, was the only plane out of 13 from the group that reached Münster to return to base. Royal Flush landed back in England with two engines dead, the intercom and the oxygen system non-functional, and with a large ragged hole in the right wing. Later the ground crews found an unexploded cannon shell in one of Royal Flush's wing tanks. Rosenthal would receive his first Silver Star for this mission.

On March 8, 1944, Rosenthal's crew, nicknamed Rosie's Riveters, completed their 25-mission combat tour, although the B-17F (s/n 42-30758) that they usually flew bearing the same name was shot down while being flown by a different crew during the February 4, 1944, mission to Frankfurt, Germany. The crew returned to the United States, but Rosenthal extended his tour, eventually flying a total of 52 missions. In May 1944, he took command of the 350th Bombardment Squadron.

On September 10, 1944, Rosenthal's B-17G Terrible Termite (s/n 42-97770), flying on a mission to bomb Nuremberg, was hit by flak and crash-landed around Reims in German-occupied France. Along with all the officers on his plane he was seriously injured. Suffering from a broken arm and nose, he was pulled from the cockpit unconscious by Free French, flown back to England, and woke up at a hospital in Oxford. Rosenthal would receive his second Silver Star after this mission. He returned to duty as soon as he had healed. Rosenthal was assigned to a desk job at wing headquarters, but he managed to return to the 100th Bomb Group and take command of his old squadron, the 418th.

On his last combat mission on February 3, 1945, Rosenthal, commanding the 418th, was part of a 2,500-plane raid against Berlin. His B-17G (s/n 44-8379), the lead bomber, suffered a direct flak hit which killed two of his crew. Although his plane was in flames, he continued to the target to drop his payload, then stayed with the plane until after the rest of the crew had bailed out, just before it exploded at an altitude of only about 1,000 feet (300 m). He broke his arm upon landing and was confronted at gunpoint by Red Army soldiers. Rosenthal identified himself as an American by yelling amerikansky! (Russian: американский!), which worked, as the Soviets understood he was an ally and helped him again return to duty. Rosenthal would earn the Distinguished Service Cross for this mission. Among the buildings hit in the raid was the "People's Court", killing the court's president, notorious "hanging judge" Roland Freisler. Freisler was an attendee of the Wannsee Conference, which formalized plans for the "Final Solution to the Jewish question".

After the war, Rosenthal served as an assistant to the U.S. prosecutor at the Nuremberg trials, where he interrogated the former head of the German Air Force, Hermann Göring and Wilhelm Keitel, former head of the German Armed Forces High Command Oberkommando der Wehrmacht (OKW). He was honorably discharged from the Army on November 30, 1945.

== Awards and decorations ==
By the end of his service he had a earned a total of 16 decorations, including the Distinguished Service Cross, the Silver Star (with cluster), the Distinguished Flying Cross (with cluster), the Air Medal (with seven clusters), the Purple Heart (with cluster), plus the British Distinguished Flying Cross and the French Croix de Guerre.

Army Air Forces Pilot Badge
Distinguished Service Cross
Silver Star with bronze oak leaf cluster
Distinguished Flying Cross with bronze oak leaf cluster
Purple Heart with bronze oak leaf cluster
Air Medal with one silver and two bronze oak leaf clusters
American Campaign Medal
European-African-Middle Eastern Campaign Medal with silver and bronze campaign stars
World War II Victory Medal
Distinguished Flying Cross (United Kingdom)
Croix de Guerre with Palm (France)

Army Presidential Unit Citation

=== Distinguished Service Cross citation ===

Rosenthal, Robert
Date of Action: February 3, 1945

Citation:

For heroism in action against the enemy on February 3, 1945, while serving as Air Commander of a Heavy Bombardment Divisions formation attacking the Templehof Marshalling Yards, Berlin, Germany. On this date, while on the bombing run, his aircraft suffered a direct hit by enemy-aircraft fire which inflicted severe damage on the plane and started an intense fire in the bomb bays. Completely disregarding his personal safety and in spite of the imminent danger of explosion, he continued to lead his formation over the target. The heroism, airmanship, and determination to complete his assigned mission displayed by Lt. Col. Rosenthal on this occasion are in keeping with the highest tradition of the Armed Forces of the United States.

== Personal and later life ==
Robert Rosenthal married Phillis Heller (1918–2011), whom he met on the ocean voyage to Germany. She served as a WAVE, and was also another lawyer on the prosecutorial staff for the Nuremberg trials. They had three children, Peggy, Steve and Dan. Robert Rosenthal died on April 20, 2007, at age 89, in White Plains, New York. He was interred in the Sharon Gardens Cemetery plot Community Synagogue of Rye Lot 197 Grave 3.

== Popular culture ==
- In 2006, Rosenthal was inducted into the Jewish-American Hall of Fame and medals were made depicting Rosenthal and his crew.
- Rosenthal’s tour with the 100th BG was documented in Lt. Col Harry Crosby’s 1993 memoir of the 100th BG, “Wing and a Prayer.”
- Rosenthal's wartime experiences with the 100th Bomb Group were featured in the book Masters of the Air: America’s Bomber Boys Who Fought the Air War Against Nazi Germany (2007) by historian Donald L. Miller. He is portrayed by Nate Mann in the nine-part Apple TV+ miniseries Masters of the Air (2024).
