= Everett Ernest Blakely =

World War II hero and career officer in the USAF

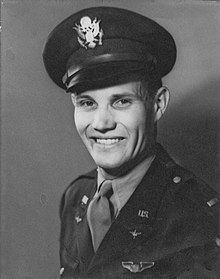
- Blakely in 1943
- Born: 1 July 1919; Elgin, Illinois, United States
- Died: 21 September 2004 (aged 85)
- Burial place: Old Mission Cemetery, San Luis Obispo
- Education: University of Washington (BA); University of Notre Dame (MA)
- Spouse: Margaret Ann Blakely
- Military career
- Allegiance: United States
- Branch: United States Army Air Corps (1941–42); United States Army Air Forces (1942–47); United States Air Force (1947–69)
- Service years: 1941–1969
- Rank: Lieutenant Colonel
- Commands: 418th Bombardment Squadron (1943–44)
- Conflicts: World War II
- Awards: Silver Star; Distinguished Flying Cross; Air Medal (5)

Everett Ernest Blakely (1 July 1919 – 21 September 2004) was a decorated officer of the United States Air Force. He flew B-17s with the "Bloody Hundredth" Bombardment Group of the Eighth Air Force in Europe during World War II and was awarded the Silver Star, the Distinguished Flying Cross and the Air Medal. Blakely and the crew of his plane, "Just A Snappin'," were credited with shooting down 9 enemy aircraft, the most enemy aircraft shot down during a single mission

The Apple TV+ mini-series Masters of the Air retells the story of the 100th Bomb Group, with actor David Shields playing the role of Blakely. The series is based on several books, including Masters of the Air by Donald L. Miller and Wing and a Prayer by Harry H. Crosby.

== Biography ==
Blakely was born on 1 July 1919, to Everett Palmer Blakely and Gottleiben "Libby" Shellenberger in his family home in Elgin, Illinois. Blakely had one brother, Robert Blakely, who served with distinction as an infantry officer and helicopter pilot in the United States Army, until he retired with the rank of major.

Blakely and his brother were raised in Seattle, Washington, by their stepmother, Gwendolyn Matthews. Blakely's father worked at the Olympic Hotel in Seattle. Everett attended Lincoln High School and later graduated from Queen Anne High School in 1938. After high school graduation, Blakely attended the University of Washington, where he majored in Latin American Studies and served in the Reserve Officer Training Program (ROTC).

Blakely was a graduate of the University of Washington and, from 1942 until 1969, served as an officer in the United States Air Force. Blakely was one of the original B-17 pilots of the 418th Bombardment Squadron of the 100th Bomb Group. The 100th Bomb Group became known as the "Bloody 100th" because of the many losses they suffered during the beginning of the allied bombing campaign in Europe. He served not only as a Command Pilot but was also the group commander of the 418th Bombardment Squadron and Station Training Officer stationed at Thorpe Abbots Air Field in England.

== United States Army Air Corps ==
In August 1941, before graduating from the University of Washington, Blakely enlisted in the United States Army Air Corps.

His first assignment was at Hancock Field in Santa Maria, California, where he was stationed from 22 August 1941, to 1 November 1941. It was at Hancock Field that he learned to fly using the Stearman PT13 biplane.

Blakely began his next assignment on 4 November 1941, at Moffett Field near San Francisco, California.

The Attack on Pearl Harbor and the subsequent entry of the United States into World War II happened one month later, on 7 December 1941. Blakely continued his flight training on a Vultee BT-13 Valiant (Vibrator), concluding this assignment at Moffet Field on 17 January 1942.

Told he would fly fighters, cadet Blakely transferred to Luke Field, Arizona, where he received advanced fighter training on a North American T-6 Texan. No longer a cadet, he graduated earning his pilot wings, and he was later commissioned as a Second Lieutenant.

On 16 March 1942, Blakely was transferred to the 3rd Air Force stationed at Dale Mabry Field in Tallahassee, Florida where he continued his fighter flight training, flying the Bell P-39 Airacobra, Curtiss P-36 Hawk, and the Republic P-43 Lancer.

About 3 months later, he was assigned to the 79th Fighter Group at Morris Field in Charlotte, North Carolina where he continued to hone his flying skills, flying the Curtiss P-40 Warhawk.

Blakely's goal of becoming a fighter pilot changed on 31 May 1942, when he was assigned to the 3rd Bomber Command at MacDill Field in Tampa, Florida and began training with the B-17 strategic bomber.

As his skills continued to develop, Blakely was transferred to the 29th Bomber Group at Gowen Field in Boise, Idaho, on 20 August 1942, and later that month to the 330th Bomber Group at Briggs Field in El Paso, Texas where he was assigned to the 459th Bomber Squadron and began training with his first crew. His crew would change slightly at several points throughout the war.

More training continued with the 333rd Bombardment Group at the Army Air Base in Topeka, Kansas, followed up with the 96th Bomber Group in Rapid City, South Dakota.

Blakely finally connected with the 100th Bomb Group on 28 October 1942, officially assigned at Walla Walla Army Air Base in Washington. Blakely spent the rest of World War II working with the 100th Bomb Group. He was promoted to 1st Lieutenant on 11 November 1942. In his "Second Phase" of training at Walla Walla Army Air Base, formation flying and aerial gunnery were emphasized.

In December 1942, Blakely was briefly assigned to Wendover Air Force Base in Utah for operational training with the 100th Bomb Group.

In January 1943, Blakely continued training with the 100th Bomb Group at Sioux City Army Air Base in Sioux City, Iowa. While stationed there, Everett attended a local dance where he met Margaret Ann Spence. They married about two months later while he was stationed at Boise Airport in Boise, Idaho. They were married until Everett's passing on 21 September 2004.

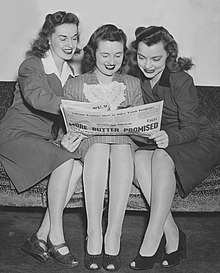
Gerry Hamilton, Margaret Blakely and Jean Crosby read news of their husbands' mission with the 100th Bomb Group

Training was completed on 20 May 1943, after flying the B-17 once more in at Wendover Field, along with subsequent brief stints at Hamilton Field in California, and an airfield in Kearney, Nebraska.

On 25 May 1943, Everett and some of his crew flew their B-17 to Thorpe Abbot airfield in England. Their route took them first to Dow Field in Bangor, Maine, then north across the Gulf of St Lawrence to Labrador City, Canada and on to Prestwick, Scotland before arriving in England. His ground crew travelled to England via the Cunard White Starliner Queen Elizabeth.

== World War II ==
In early June 1943, Blakely arrived in Thorpe Abbots, England. The United States Army Air Force (USAAF) had been created on 20 June 1939, and the first B-17E arrived in High Wycombe, England under the Command of General Ira C. Eaker on 12 May 1942. The first mission of the USAAF was on 17 August 1942, against the railroad yards in Rouen-Sotteville, France.

Blakely served in the 418th Bomber Squadron of the 100th Bombardment Group of the 8th Air Force in Europe. He was stationed in England at Thorpe Abbots Airfield. Thorpe Abbots was Station #139 which was in operation from June 1942 to 1944 with its primary function as a base for the B-17.

Over the years, two B-17s were assigned to Blakely and his crew. The first B-17F, assigned in 1942, was plane #42-30061, named "Just A Snappin'". In August 1943, this plane was later assigned to the Robert Wolff crew and became known as "Wolff Pack". Because Blakely piloted the lead crew he received a newer B-17F #42-23393. This plane retained the name "Just A Snappin'". Blakely's plane was also sometimes referred to as "The Provisional Group".

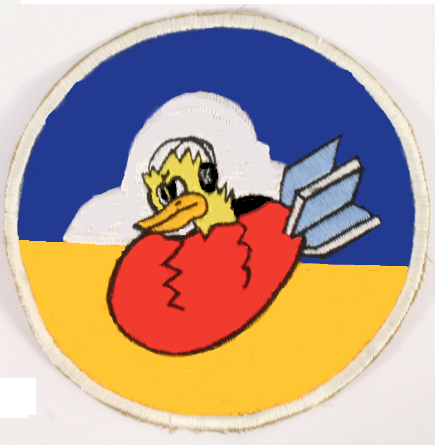
Emblem for the 418th Bombardment Squadron

According to Harry Crosby's book "A Wing and a Prayer," on the mission to Saint Nazaire in Northwestern France, Blakely's plane limped back to Thorpe Abbot,

"We kid Blakely about flying alone. We call him 'The Provisional Group,' an outfit that comes to the base to replace missing crews. He responds, 'We were behind you, just a-snappin' at your heels'. that's where he got the name for his plane."

Blakely was an original pilot assigned to the 418th Bomber Squadron. He had a humble demeanor and was well respected by everyone in the 100th Bomb Group.

From William R. Fogle's Journal – 100th Bomb Group (Heavy) Foundation (100thbg.com)

Captain Blakely, one of our best-liked and most able pilots, brought his Ship 393 back from Germany on two engines, crash-landing in or near Norwich. One of the waist gunners, Saunders, got a belly full of lead and lived for a while, but finally died. Later, Captain Blakely was made the new CO. Everyone will like that, I'm sure.

== Missions ==
The list of missions in which Blakely participated is incomplete. As one of the original crews assigned to Thorpe Abbotts Blakely usually served as lead pilot of his bomb group. After the mission to Bremen on October 8, 1943, Blakely's plane was destroyed. He was promoted to squadron commander of the 418th Squadronwas promoted to. After this promotion he flew many missions as a Command Pilot. In late 1944 he became the base Training Officer.

On 25 June 1943, VIII Bomber Command Mission No. 67 began as Blakely's first operation with the 100th Bomb Group, which took place in the city of Bremen, Germany. During this mission, Blakely's aircraft sustained severe damage, though he managed to return it to base.

VIII Bomber Command Mission No. 69 constituted the second operation for Blakely with the 100th Bomb Group, carried out on 28 June 1943 against a military submarine dock and a German fighter installation at Saint-Nazaire, France. Blakely encountered heavy anti-aircraft fire but no fighter opposition, with cover provided by RAF Spitfires and USAAF Thunderbolts. Blakely's aircraft lost two engines during the mission but again successfully returned to base.

VIII Bomber Command Mission No. 71 represented the fourth operation for the 100th Bomb Group and the third mission flown by Blakely, targeting the submarine pens at a French coastal port (La Pallice, France) on 4 July 1943. Blakely endured the mission for 10 hours and 45 minutes.

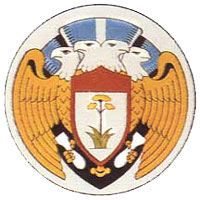
Emblem of the 100th Bombardment Group

VIII Bomber Command Mission No. 72, flown on 10 July 1943, was Blakely's fourth mission and targeted Le Bourget Airfield near Paris. Blakely flown B-17 aircraft #230061 named Just A Snappin. This operation involved 100 other B-17s fighters, of which Blakely would be credited as part of the group which destroyed four enemy aircraft.

The last week of July 1943 became known as Blitz Week. A period of USAAF aerial bombardment during the 1943 Combined Bomber Offensive of World War II where air raids were conducted on six of seven days as part of Operation Gomorrah.

On 24 July 1943, the 100th Bomb Group, including Blakely, was directed by the 8th Bomber Command to bomb submarine pens in Trondheim, Norway. For this mission, Harry Crosby joined the Blakely crew as Navigator. This was a 1,900-mile mission and the longest to date for Blakely, requiring over 12 hours in the air under unique conditions, such as low altitude flying to conserve oxygen. Given the intensity of the operation and its success, Blakely received the Distinguished Flying Cross for his actions on this mission.

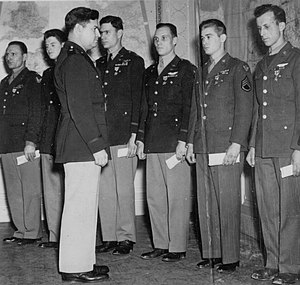
Brig. Gen. Curtis Lemay awarding Captain Everett Blakely the Silver Star for his valor on the Bremen Mission.

VIII Bomber Command Mission No. 81, conducted on 12 August 1943, involved the 100th Bomb Group targeting Wesseling and its synthetic oil production facility. Due to fog obscuring the primary, secondary, and tertiary targets, the Bonn railroad yard was selected as a target of opportunity. Everett Blakely flew Just A Snappin with Harry Crosby serving as lead navigator.

VIII Bomber Command Mission 84: -- One of the most famous air battles of World War II came next for "The Bloody 100th." On August 17, 1943, the 100th Bomb Group joined other heavy bombers from the 8th Air Force on a historic two-pronged attack on Schweinfurt-Regensburg. This mission marked the deepest penetration into Germany to date. Captain Blakely in Just A Snappin was the 100th Bomb Group lead pilot for this mission. The entire 8th AF sent 146 B 17s to Regensburg. 100th Bomb Group sent 21 B-17s on this mission. 14 of those planes hit the target. Nine planes of the 100th were listed as missing with 17 men killed, 59 men became POWS, and 10 airmen ended up interned in Switzerland. The Americans encountered over 300 Luftwaffe fighters that downed 24 bombers – a loss of over 200 men. The 100th Bomb Group lost 9 aircraft in all. The execution of the plan to bomb two major targets did not go as planned. The group led by Captain Blakely was sent to Regensburg to bomb a Messerschmitt Aircraft factory where it succeeded in damaging every important building in the complex. After hitting the target, this group headed out over the Alps and on to Algeria. Colonel Curtis LeMay was group leader on the Regensburg mission. Blakely was flying a new plane on this mission: B-17F#23393 with the same name -Just A Snappin. The 100th Bomb Group received its first Presidential Unit Citation for this mission. This mission to Africa took the 100th BG over 11 hours. On September 29, 1943, Captain Blakely received the Distinguished Flying Cross from Curtis LeMay for his valor on this mission.

VIII Bomber Command Mission 88: -- On the way back from Algeria on August 31, 1943, the 100th Bomb Group, led by pilot Captain Blakely flew to Thorpe Abbot, and on the way back attacked an airfield at Bordeaux-Merignac. No 100th BG planes were lost on this mission.

VIII Bomber Command Mission 91: -- The 8th AF set a new record in number of heavy bombers dispatched on September 6, 1943, to Stuttgart. The mission was to bomb the Daimler and Porsche factories, an air base in Conches, SKF ball bearing factory and a Bosch factory where 90% of the German magnetos were produced. Because of the around VIII Bomber Command Mission No. 97 – On 16 September 1943, Captain Everett Blakely flew as lead pilot of the 100th Bomb Group in Just A Snappin, undertaking a mission to bomb a U-boat base in France.

VIII Bomber Command Mission No. 100 – On 23 September 1943, Major Flesher, serving as Group Air Executive, accompanied Captain Blakely on a mission to Vannes, targeting the port facilities. No aircraft from the 100th Bomb Group were lost during this operation.

Blakely's 18th mission was VIII Bomber Command Mission 111, which took place in Bremen, Germany on 8 October 1943. This was the first mission in which strips of aluminum were dropped to jam German radar (what became known as "Chaff" or "Window"). On this day, the crew of Just A Snappin was credited with shooting down nine Nazi fighters, which is the highest record for a single plane on a single mission during this war. The bomber lost two engines, causing it to lose altitude and nearly requiring her to land in the North Sea. Staff Sergeant Lester Saunders, a gunner, was killed in action on this mission. 22 planes from the 100th Bomb Group flew this mission. Just A Snappin was heavily damaged, and crash landed at an unused RAF base in England. Five crew members were injured and received purple hearts. The salvage crew counted over 800 holes in the B-17 from flak, machine gun bullets and 20 mm cannon shells. Everett Blakely received the Silver Star medal for his service during this mission.

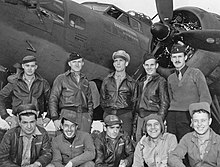

VIII Bomber Command Mission 111 crew members:

- Major John Kidd – Command Pilot
- 1st Lt. Everett Blakely – Pilot
- 2nd Lt. Charles Via – Formation Officer (SWA on this mission)
- 1st Lt. Harry Crosby – Navigator
- 2nd Lt. James Douglas – Bombardier
- T/Sgt. Edmund Forkner -Radio Operator
- S/Sgt. William McClelland – Ball Turret Gunner (Wounded in Action on this mission)
- S/Sgt Edward Yevich – Waist Gunner (Wounded in Action on this mission)
- S/Sgt Lyle Nord – Waist Gunner
- S/Sgt. Lester Saunders – Tail Gunner (Killed in Action on this mission)

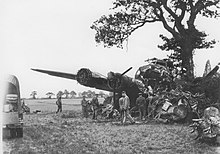
Just A Snappin crash landing on 8 October 1943

Blakely was promoted to Major and became the 418th Bomber Squadron Commander from October 1943 to April 1944. Later in 1944, Major Blakely returned to the United States and became a Group Training Officer.

== After the war ==
After the war, Blakely was sent to Williams Air Force Base in Tempe, Arizona, where he became the Director of the Post Mechanics School.

In 1948, Blakely completed his undergraduate education at the University of Washington in Latin American Studies B.A., using the newly established G.I. Bill. After graduation in 1948, Blakely attended the Army Language School in Monterey, California where he became fluent in Spanish language. Upon graduation he was assigned in Cali, Colombia, where he served as an attache to the Colombian Air Force from 1949 to 1952 and was awarded by the Colombian Air Force with Pilot Wings of their service.

Blakely's next assignment was as Group Commander of Training at Norton Air Force Base near San Bernardino, California, where from 1953 to 1954, he served as Acting Base Commander. Blakely was later stationed at Warner Robins Air Force Base near Macon, Georgia from 1954 to 1957 in the capacity of Director of the Plans and Programs Division.

After this stateside assignment, Blakely was transferred overseas to Clark Air Force Base in the Philippines where he served as the Director of the Communication Engineering Division from 1957 to 1960.

Stateside once again, Blakely became the Air Force ROTC Director at the University of Notre Dame in South Bend, Indiana from 1960 to 1965. While at Notre Dame, he earned his master's degree in Guidance and Counseling.

Next, Blakely was assigned the task of cleaning up and closing down Toul Rosieres Air Base near Nancy, France. Charles de Gaulle, who was the French President at that time, ordered all non-French military installations to be removed from France, while remaining a member of NATO. After closing down the facility, Blakely was reassigned as assistant director for Materiel of the 26th Tactical Reconnaissance Wing at Ramstein Air Force Base near Kaiserslautern, Germany.

After 27 years serving as an officer in the United States Air Force, Blakely retired from his military career, returning to California where he worked at Lockheed Air in Burbank, California. Retiring from Lockheed in the late 1980s, he and his wife, Margaret moved to San Luis Obispo, California in 1989.

Blakely died on 21 September 2004, at the age of 85 and is buried in the Old Mission Catholic Cemetery in San Luis Obispo.

== Just A Snappin ==
On 9 June 2025 at Royal Air Force Mindenhall, England, the legacy of Everett Blakely's World War II B-17 was honored when his plane's nose art was placed on a KC-135 Statotanker.

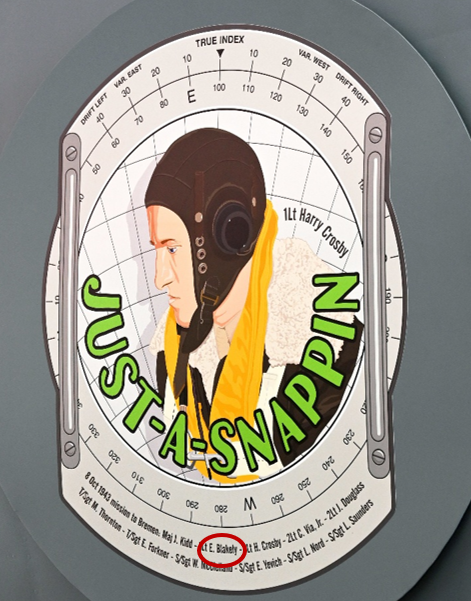
Just A Snappin Nose Art

== Awards and citations ==
Silver Star, Distinguished Flying Cross, Air Medal with 4 Oak Leaf Clusters, Air Force Commendation American Defense Service Medal, American Campaign Medal, European African Middle Eastern Campaign, World War II Victory Medal, National Defense Medal

Presidential Unit Citation with 1 Oak Leaf Cluster	Longevity Service Award With 4 Oak Leaves	Command Pilot Wings	Colombian Pilot Wings with 3 Stars
