= Gale Cleven =

American pilot (1918–2006)

Gale W. Cleven
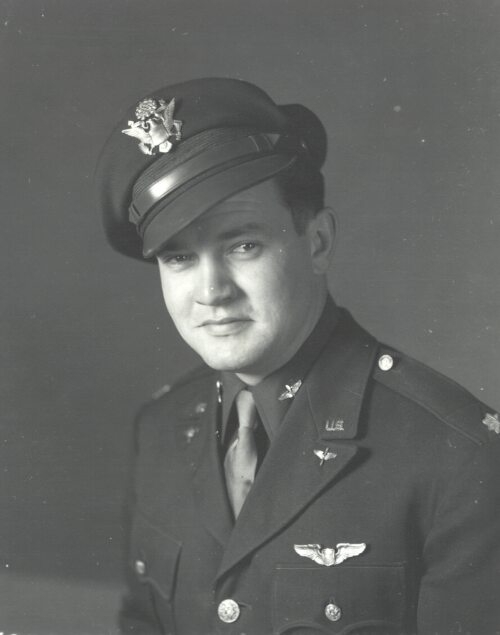
- Born: December 27, 1918; Lemmon, South Dakota, U.S.
- Died: November 17, 2006 (aged 87); Sheridan, Wyoming, U.S.
- Burial place: Santa Fe National Cemetery
- Education: University of Wyoming (BA); Harvard Business School (MBA); Georgetown University (PhD)
- Spouses: Marjorie Ruth Spencer (m. 1945; died 1953); Esther Lee Athey (m. 1955)
- Military career
- Allegiance: United States
- Branch: United States Army Air Forces; United States Air Force
- Service years: 1940–1963
- Rank: Colonel
- Nickname: Buck
- Service number: O-399782
- Unit: 100th Bombardment Group (Heavy)
- Conflicts: World War II; Korean War; Vietnam War
- Awards: Distinguished Service Cross; Distinguished Flying Cross; Air Medal (4)

Gale Winston "Buck" Cleven (December 27, 1918 – November 17, 2006) was an American pilot who flew 22 missions with the 100th Bomb Group of the United States Army Air Forces during World War II, continuing in the newly created United States Air Force, where he served during the Korean and Vietnam wars.

== Early life and military service ==
Gale Cleven was born on December 27, 1918, in Lemmon, South Dakota, before the family moved to Wyoming for his father to work in the oil fields. Cleven grew up slightly north of Casper, Wyoming and graduated valedictorian at his high school. He worked as a roughneck in the oil fields throughout his undergraduate career at the University of Wyoming. During his time at the University of Wyoming he studied mathematics on a full academic scholarship and was a council member for Phi Delta Theta. He later completed another degree at the University of Wyoming, majoring in geology.

=== Military ===
On February 20, 1940, Cleven commissioned in the Army as a Second Lieutenant and received flight training at Randolph and Kelly Fields, Texas. He was an instructor for the 29th Bomb Group at the MacDill Field in May 1942 and was promoted to commander of the 350th Bombardment Squadron in July 1942.

His service with the 100th Bomb Group of the Eighth Air Force began on October 27, 1942. In January 1943 he was promoted to the rank of major. He was a part of the Regensburg shuttle mission, piloting one of the few B-17s to reach North Africa. In a post-mission report, it was recommended that Cleven receive the Medal of Honor for his actions during the mission; he instead received a Distinguished Service Cross.

On October 8, 1943, while on his 22nd mission, he was shot down over Bremen, Germany. Cleven was then taken as a prisoner-of-war to Stalag Luft III and Stalag VII-A, before escaping to American lines in March 1945. During his time in the camp, Cleven taught advanced calculus to other prisoners.

Cleven continued to be a member of the Air Force and served throughout the Korean and Vietnam wars before he retired, with the rank of colonel. While in the military, Cleven held positions in management in data processing divisions of the Atomic Energy Commission, US Air Force, and the Office of Defense.

== Personal life ==
Cleven married his childhood sweetheart Marjorie Ruth Spencer from Lander, Wyoming, in July 1945. She died from a brain aneurysm in August 1953 shortly after contracting polio while visiting her family in Coffeyville, Kansas. At the time, Cleven was being transferred from Kirtland Air Force Base in Albuquerque, New Mexico to the Norton Air Force Base in San Bernardino, California. In 1955, he married Esther Lee Athey, to whom he remained married until he died in 2006, leaving behind his wife, a daughter and two grandchildren.

During flying school, Cleven was given the nickname Buck by fellow airman and best friend John "Bucky" Egan, as the latter thought that he looked like his friend from Wisconsin named Buck. Egan reportedly brought a silk parachute to Cleven's and Spencer's wedding to be used as bridal dress material for Spencer.

After the war, Cleven earned an MBA from Harvard Business School in 1949 and a Ph.D. in interplanetary physics from Georgetown University in 1964. After retiring from the Air Force, Cleven held a number of different jobs including in aeronautics and as the president of Webber College from 1979–1986. During his time as president at Webber College he was credited with increasing enrollment and the academic offerings of the college, and laying the foundation for the school's athletic programs.

== In popular culture ==
Cleven is portrayed by Austin Butler in Apple TV+'s Masters of the Air. His future wife Marge Spencer is portrayed by Isabel May.

== Awards and decorations ==
His awards include:

USAF Command pilot badge
Distinguished Service Cross
Distinguished Flying Cross
Air Medal with three bronze oak leaf clusters
Air Force Presidential Unit Citation
Prisoner of War Medal
American Defense Service Medal
American Campaign Medal
European-African-Middle Eastern Campaign Medal with bronze campaign star
World War II Victory Medal
National Defense Service Medal
Air Force Longevity Service Award with four bronze oak leaf clusters

=== Distinguished Service Cross citation ===
Cleven, Gale W.
Major (Air Corps), U.S. Army Air Forces
350th Bombardment Squadron, 100th Bombardment Group, Eighth Air Force
Date of Action: August 17, 1943

Citation:

The President of the United States of America, authorized by Act of Congress July 9, 1918, takes pleasure in presenting the Distinguished Service Cross to Major (Air Corps) Gale Winston Cleven, United States Army Air Forces, for extraordinary heroism in connection with military operations against an armed enemy while serving as Pilot of a B-17 Heavy Bomber in the 350th Bombardment Squadron, 100th Bombardment Group (H), Eighth Air Force, while participating in a bombing mission on 17 August 1943, against enemy ground targets in Bremen, Germany. With his ship badly damaged, partially out of control, and with serious injuries to his personnel, Major Cleven continued to lead his squadron to the target in the face of extremely heavy attacks by enemy aircraft, executed a successful bombing attack, and reached base in North Africa safely. This brilliantly successful operation, to which Major Cleven contributed very largely, resulted in a damaging blow to the enemy by the destruction of military objectives and of a large number of enemy aircraft. The extraordinary heroism, coolness, and skill displayed by Major Cleven on this occasion reflected the greatest credit upon himself and inspired the members of his command.
