= Alexander Jefferson =

United States Army officer (1921–2022)

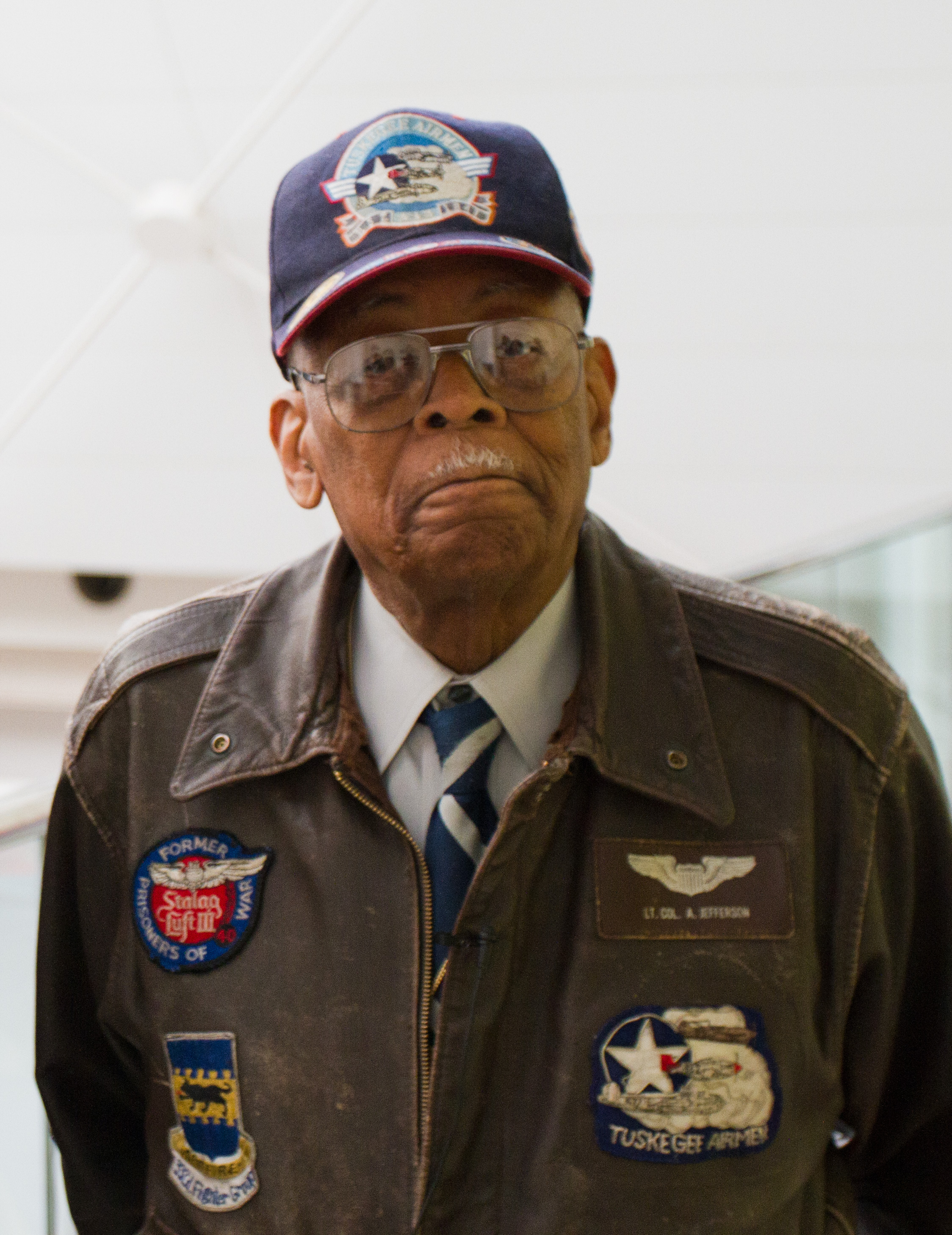
- Born: November 15, 1921; Detroit, Michigan, U.S.
- Died: June 22, 2022 (aged 100); Detroit, Michigan, U.S.
- Military career
- Allegiance: United States
- Branch: United States Army Air Forces; United States Air Force
- Service years: 1942–1969
- Rank: Lieutenant Colonel
- Unit: 332nd Fighter Group
- Conflicts: World War II
- Awards: Congressional Gold Medal; Distinguished Flying Cross; Bronze Star Medal; Purple Heart; Air Medal

Alexander Jefferson (November 15, 1921 – June 22, 2022) was an American Air Force officer, famous as one of the Tuskegee Airmen, the 332nd Fighter Group. He served in the United States Army Air Forces during World War II.

His book, Red Tail Captured, Red Tail Free: Memoirs of a Tuskegee Airman and POW, is a personal memoir of those who served America in World War II and after.

== Early life ==
Jefferson was born in Detroit, Michigan, on November 15, 1921, the eldest child of Alexander Jefferson and Jane White Jefferson. His maternal great-grandfather William Jefferson White was born to a slave woman and a white slave owner in the 1830s. Jefferson's grandfather became a minister, and in 1867, opened an all black ministry school for boys in Augusta, Georgia, which today is known as Morehouse College.

Jefferson attended Craft Elementary School, Munger Intermediate School, and Chadsey High School, graduating in 1938, the only African-American to take college preparatory classes. In 1942, he graduated from Clark College in Atlanta, Georgia, with a Bachelor of Science degree in Chemistry and Biology.

== World War II ==
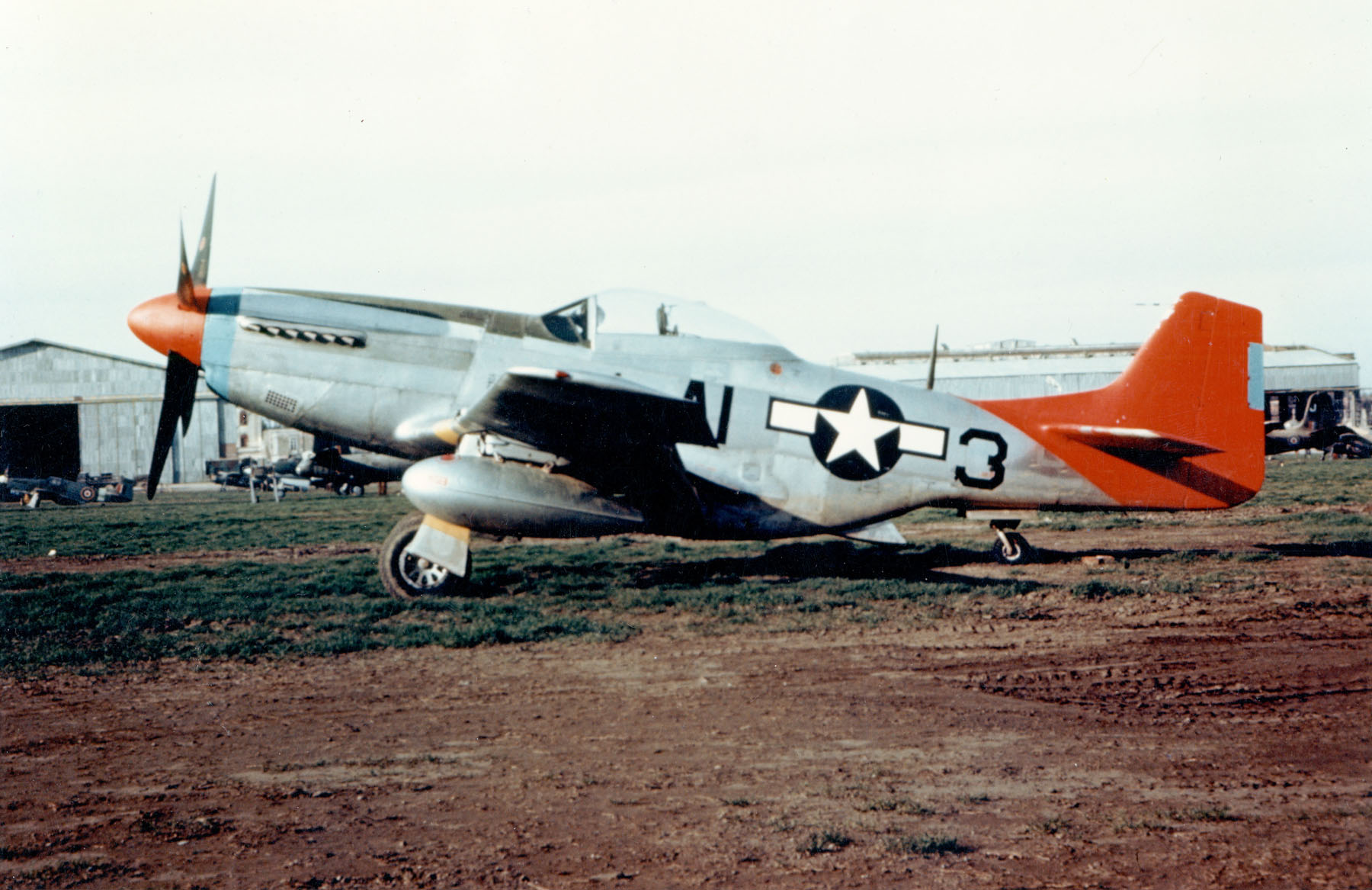
The Tuskegee Airmen's aircraft had distinctive markings that led to the name, "Red Tails." (Note: The red markings that distinguished the Tuskegee Airmen included red bands on the noses of P-51s as well as a red rudder; their P-51B and D Mustangs flew with similar color schemes, with red propeller spinners, yellow wing bands and all-red tail surfaces.)

On September 23, 1942, he was sworn into the United States Army Reserve, volunteering but not accepted for flight training. Taking a job as an analytical chemist for three months, he entered the graduate school of Howard University, applying again to the US Army Air Force.

Called up for flight training in April 1943, Jefferson received orders to report to Tuskegee Army Air Field to begin flight training. Receiving his pilots wings and officer's commission at Tuskegee, he was assigned to the 332nd "Red Tail" Fighter group at the Ramitelli Airfield near Foggia, Italy, flying the P-51 Mustang. Assigned to a fighter escort wing protecting bombing missions of the US 15th Air Force, his job was to attack key ground targets and guard the bombing mission against enemy Nazi Luftwaffe fighters.

During his 19th mission over Toulon, southern France on August 12, 1944, while attacking a radar installation he was shot down. Parachuting to safety and landing within a forest, he was immediately captured by Nazi ground troops. He was sent to prisoner of war camp Stalag Luft III in Poland, a specialist Luftwaffe-run camp for captured Allied Air Force personnel. During his period of internment, Jefferson comments that he was treated like any other Air Force officer by his German captors. He was then moved to Stalag VII-A, just outside Dachau. After the Russian Army entered Poland, the prisoners were marched to Munich by the Germans, where they were freed by General George Patton's US Third Army. Jefferson returned to the United States on board the Cunard liner RMS Queen Mary, arriving in New York City in mid-1945:

Having been treated by the Nazis like every other Allied officer, I walked down the gang plank wearing an Army Air Corps Officer's uniform towards a white US Army sergeant on the dock, who informed us "Whites to the right, niggers to the left."

== Postwar career ==
Jefferson served as an instrument instructor at Tuskegee Army airfield, until it closed in 1946. He remained in the US Air Force reserve, finally retiring in 1969. In 1947 Jefferson received his teaching certificate from Wayne State University, and began teaching elementary school science for the Detroit Public School System. He received his M.A. degree in education in 1954, and was appointed assistant principal in 1969. He retired in 1979 as an assistant principal, after over 30 years service. He celebrated his 100th birthday in 2021.

== Personal life ==
Jefferson died in his home city, Detroit, Michigan on June 22, 2022, at the age of 100.

== Legacy ==
=== Honors ===
In 1995, Jefferson was enshrined in the Michigan Aviation Hall of Fame. In 2004, President George W. Bush awarded Jefferson a Purple Heart for being wounded while being shot down over German-occupied France. On March 29, 2007, Jefferson attended a ceremony in the U.S. Capitol rotunda, where he and all the other members of the Tuskegee Airmen (and their widows) were collectively awarded the Congressional Gold Medal in recognition of their service.

Detroit, Michigan honored Jefferson for his service during WWII, with a metaphorical "key to the city" In 2021.

=== Military awards ===
Jefferson's decorations and awards include:

1st row	Distinguished Flying Cross	Bronze Star Medal	Purple Heart
2nd row	Air Medal	Air Force Presidential Unit Citation	Air Force Achievement Medal
3rd row	Prisoner of War Medal	American Defense Service Medal	American Campaign Medal
4th row	European-African-Middle Eastern Campaign Medal	World War II Victory Medal	National Defense Service Medal
5th row	Air Force Longevity Service Award	Armed Forces Reserve Medal	French Knight of the Legion of Honor Medal

Additional awards include the Congressional Gold Medal, pictured.

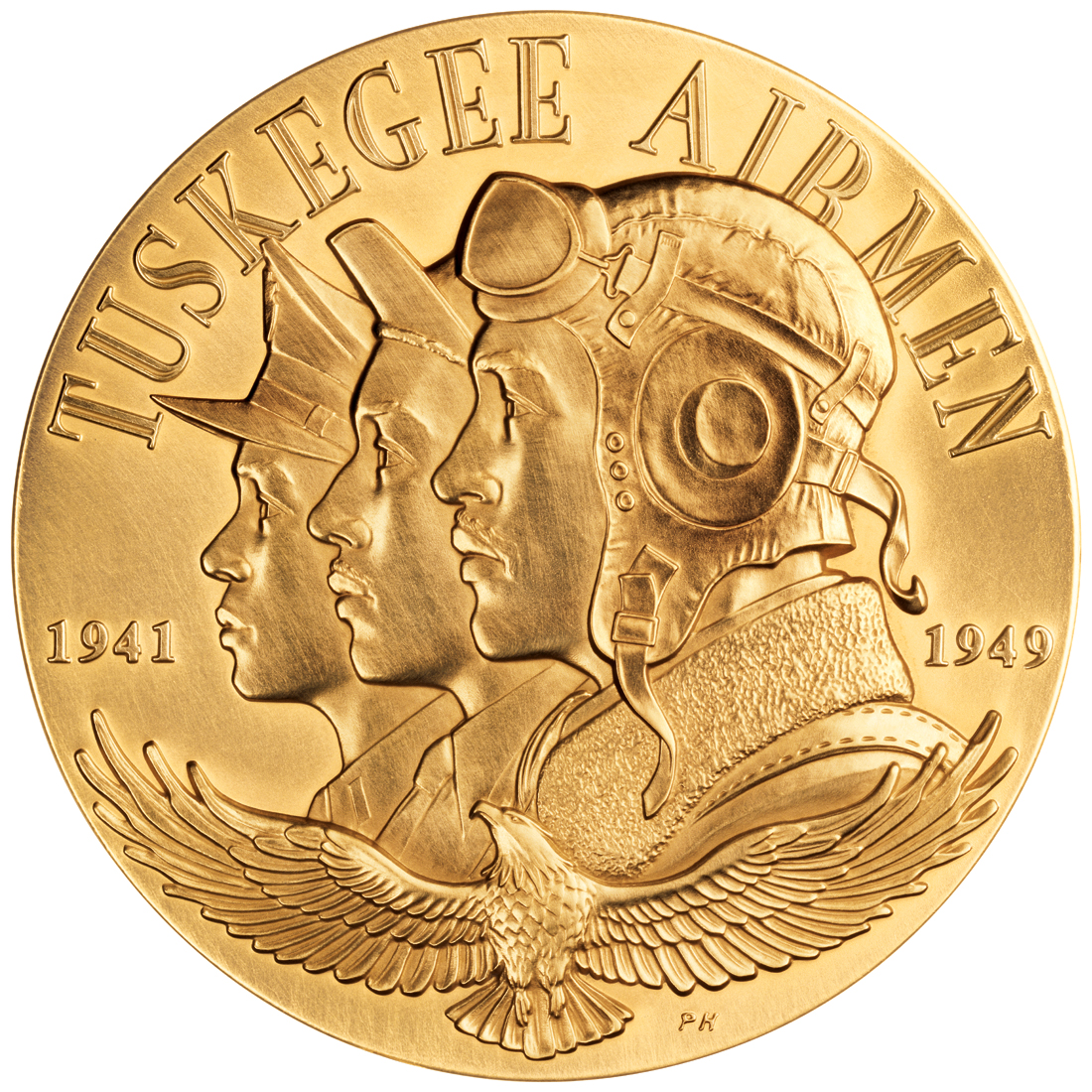

=== Documentary ===
A documentary, The Luft Gangster: Memoirs of A Second Class Hero (2016), was made about the life and legacy of Jefferson.

== See also ==
- Dogfights (TV series)
- Masters of the Air
- Executive Order 9981
- List of Tuskegee Airmen
- Military history of African Americans
- List of Tuskegee Airmen Cadet Pilot Graduation Classes
