= Harry Herbert Crosby =

United States Army Air Forces officer

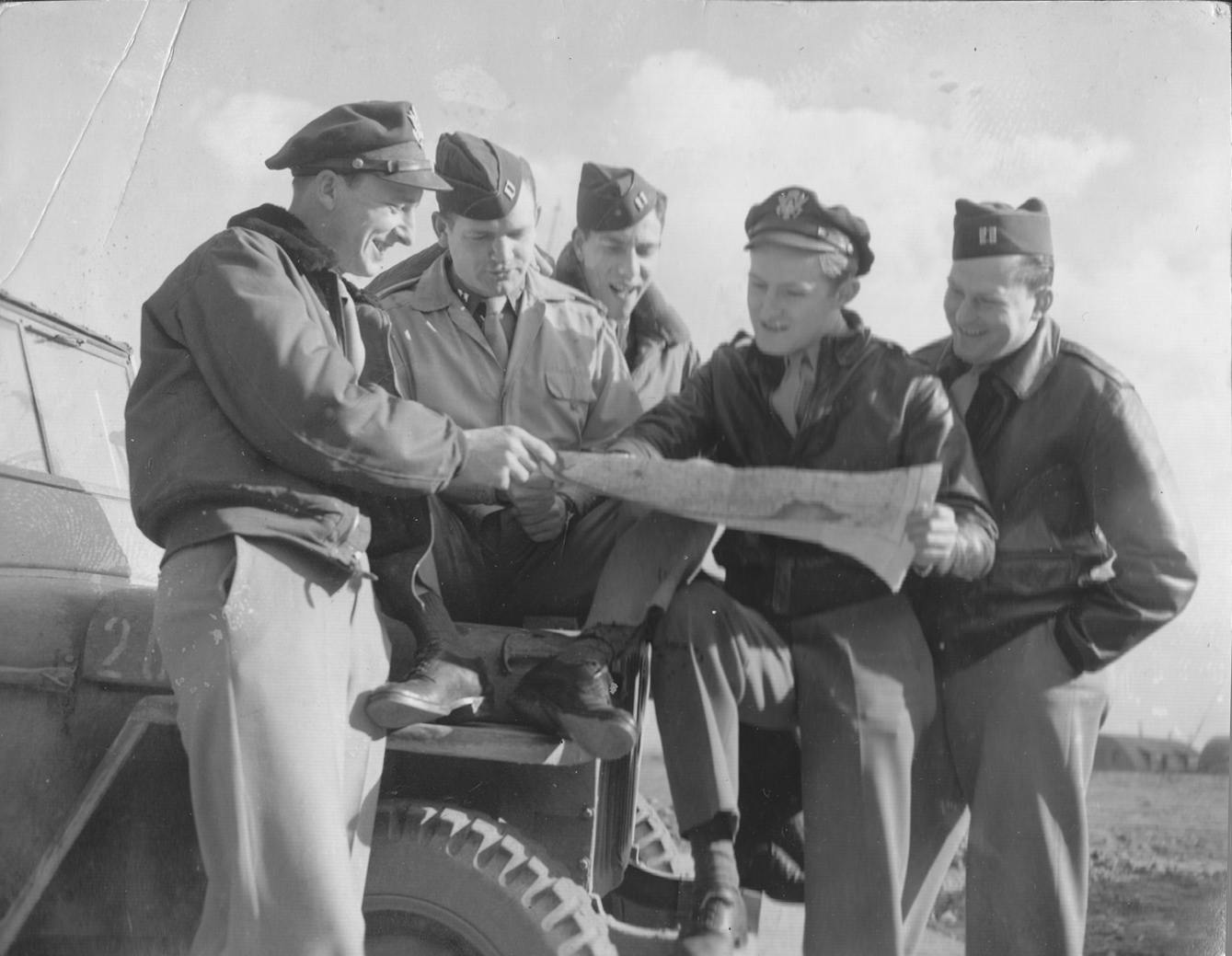
- Crosby (2nd right), with other senior navigators
- Born: April 18, 1919; New England, North Dakota, U.S.
- Died: July 28, 2010 (aged 91); Nahant, Massachusetts, U.S.
- Burial place: East Parish Burying Ground
- Spouses: Jean Evelyn Boehner (m. 1943; died 1980); Mary Alice Tompkins (m. 1982)
- Children: Stephen, April, Jeffrey, and Rebecca
- Military career
- Allegiance: United States
- Branch: United States Army Air Forces
- Service years: 1941–1945
- Rank: Lieutenant Colonel
- Units: 100th Bombardment Group (Heavy); 13th Combat Wing, 8th Air Force
- Conflicts: World War II
- Awards: Distinguished Flying Cross (2); Bronze Star; Air Medal (3); Croix de Guerre (France)

Lieutenant Colonel Harry Herbert Crosby (April 18, 1919 – July 28, 2010) was an American professor, author and B-17 Flying Fortress navigator. As an officer of the United States Army Air Forces in World War II, he flew 32 combat missions and was awarded the Distinguished Flying Cross (with two oak leaf clusters), the Air Medal (with three oak leaf clusters), the Bronze Star, and the Croix de Guerre.

== Biography ==
On December 13, 1941, following the Imperial Japanese Navy attack on Pearl Harbor, Crosby suspended his graduate degree studies at the University of Iowa to enlist in the United States Army Air Forces. He was assigned to Mather Field, California, where he trained as a Boeing B-17 Flying Fortress navigator. Transferred to Boise, Idaho, Crosby was assigned to the 418th Squadron of the 100th Bombardment Group. In May 1943 he was one of 36 original "Bloody 100th" combat crews who flew their B-17s to Warton, England and a week later to their base at RAF Thorpe Abbotts, in East Anglia.

Crosby's first combat mission was on June 28, 1943:

"He was Lead Navigator for many of the long-range and all the shuttle missions flown by the 100th starting with the July 24, 1943, 1,900-mile trip to Trondheim, Norway with Col Neil Harding (100th Gp Commander). This was the start of a series of missions known as 'Blitz Week'. The Regensburg/Africa shuttle with Major John Kidd and Everett Blakely, the Group's long shuttle to Migorod via Ruhland, always a dangerous target that lay just south of Berlin. This second shuttle mission was code named ‘Frantic’, a mission which demanded the utmost in precision navigation as the distance closely approached the maximum range of the B-17."

In November 1943, Crosby was promoted to lead navigator of the 100th Bomb Group He led missions of as many as 2,000 heavy bombers. By war’s end, he had flown 32 combat missions.

Returning to school, Crosby graduated from the University of Iowa in 1947 with his master's degree, and then earned his PhD from Stanford University in 1953, where Wallace Stegner supervised his dissertation. Harry taught English composition and American literature at the University of Iowa, and was the Writing Supervisor of the Rhetoric Program (1950–1958).

In 1958, Crosby moved with his wife and four children to Newton, Massachusetts, for a faculty position at the College of Basic Studies (CBS) at Boston University. He retired from Boston University in 1984, after chairing the Department of Rhetoric at CBS and authoring or co-authoring with CBS colleagues six textbooks on college writing:

- College Writing – The Rhetorical Imperative, Crosby/Estey; Harper & Row, 1968
- Just Rhetoric, Crosby/Estey; Harper & Row 1972
- The Shape of Thought: An Analytical Anthology, Bond/Crosby; Harper & Row, 1978
- Building College Spelling Skills, Crosby/Emery; Little Brown; 1981
- Better Spelling in 30 Minutes a Day, Crosby/Emery; Harper Collins 1994
- Skill Builders – A Spelling Workout, Crosby/Emery; Harper Collins, 1997

During his early retirement, Crosby was Director of the Writing Center at Harvard University.

Crosby's combined military and university experience prepared him to help develop the curriculum at the United States Air Force Academy, early in its history in Colorado Springs. In 1960, Harry took a leave of absence from Boston University for two years as Director of Studies for the Pakistan Air Force Academy in Risalpur, (West) Pakistan. He helped develop the pilot training program with his family into a full military college modeled on the United States service academies. He was also tasked by the Central Intelligence Agency with helping track Pakistan's use of American military aid and relationships with China and the Soviet Union.

During his 26 years in Newton, Crosby and his wife Jean were active in church, community, and civic affairs. They attended Grace Episcopal Church, where Harry served on the Vestry Committee and, with Jean, supported church sponsorship of several immigrant Cambodian "boat people" families. They chaired five successful Newton campaigns (1970 - 1978) for anti-Vietnam War Representative Father Robert Drinan. In 1980, Harry worked in Representative Barney Frank’s first congressional campaign. He was also an early and long supporter of Michael Dukakis’s political career. Crosby served on the Newton Board of Aldermen from 1970 to 1973, during which time he was particularly pleased to support development of both the Newton Arts Center and low-income housing.

In 1993, Harper Collins published Crosby's World War II memoir A Wing and a Prayer.

Crosby's account later became source material for the 2024 Spielberg-Hanks production Masters of the Air, where he is portrayed by Irish actor Anthony Boyle.

Crosby was featured in the Smithsonian Air and Space Museum's Time and Navigation Display, which can be viewed on-line. His wartime scrapbook can also be viewed there.

Harry Crosby died on July 28, 2010, at age 91.

At the memorial service, Governor Michael Dukakis said of Harry:

"He was smart. He had a strong sense of values that was in everything he said and did. He was the nicest guy in the world, but he could be tough – and in being tough he was often the best kind of friend."

== In popular culture ==
Crosby is portrayed by Anthony Boyle in Apple TV+'s Masters of the Air.

== Notes ==
- The Wartime Navigator
- Harry Crosby Scrapbook
- Harry Crosby – "30 Missions Over Europe in B-17s"
- American Air Museum – Harry Herbert Crosby
- Harry Crosby Obituary. The Boston Globe, August 1, 2010)]
- Open Road (publisher) Author page
- 100th Bomb Group Foundation – Major Harry Crosby
- National WW2 Museum article – Bloody 100th Bomb Group
- Harry Herbert Crosby WWII Veteran on Prairie Public Radio
