= Harold Huglin =

American general (1906-1975)

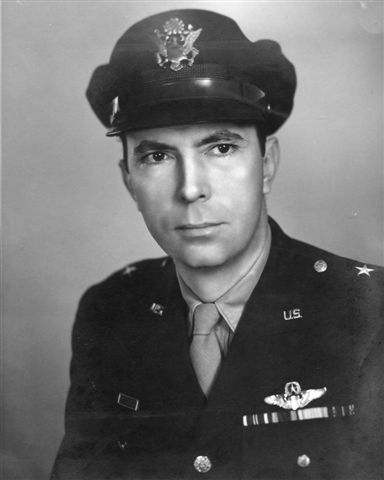
- Born: 22 September 1906; Fairfield, Iowa, US
- Died: 24 November 1975 (aged 69); St Petersburg, Florida, US
- Burial place: Arlington National Cemetery
- Military career
- Allegiance: United States
- Branch: United States Army; United States Air Force
- Service years: 1929–1959
- Rank: Brigadier General
- Service number: O-17548
- Commands: 100th Bombardment Group; 13th Combat Bombardment Wing; 4th Combat Bombardment Wing; 92nd Bombardment Wing; 530th Air Transport Wing
- Conflicts: World War II: Air Offensive Europe; Normandy; Northern France; Rhineland; Ardennes-Alsace; Central Europe
- Awards: Silver Star; Legion of Merit (2); Distinguished Flying Cross; Bronze Star Medal; Air Medal; Commendation Ribbon (3); Chevalier of the Legion of Honour (France); Croix de Guerre 1939–1945 avec Palme (France); Croix de guerre avec Palme (Belgium); War Cross 1939–1945 (Czechoslovakia); Commander of the Order of the British Empire (UK)

Harold Quiskie (Note: A typo in Huglin’s official online USAF biography gave his middle name as “Quiskey.” Air Force News Services corrected it on November 16, 2021.) Huglin (22 September 1906 – 24 November 1975) was a United States Army Air Forces and United States Air Force brigadier general who served in World War II.

A 1929 graduate of the United States Military Academy at West Point, New York, Huglin was commissioned as a second lieutenant in the Field Artillery. He applied for pilot training, and transferred to the United States Army Air Corps in 1931. He flew air mail routes when the Army was called upon to deliver air mail in 1934. During World War II he served in Europe with the Eighth Air Force. He commanded the 100th Bombardment Group, 13th Combat Bombardment Wing, 4th Combat Bombardment Wing and 92nd Bombardment Wing, and flew nine combat missions, earning the Distinguished Flying Cross for leading one on Magdeburg in August 1944. After the war he served on the staff of the U.S. Air Forces in Europe, in the Pacific with the Military Air Transport Service, and in Washington, DC, in the Office of Defense Mobilization.

== Early life ==
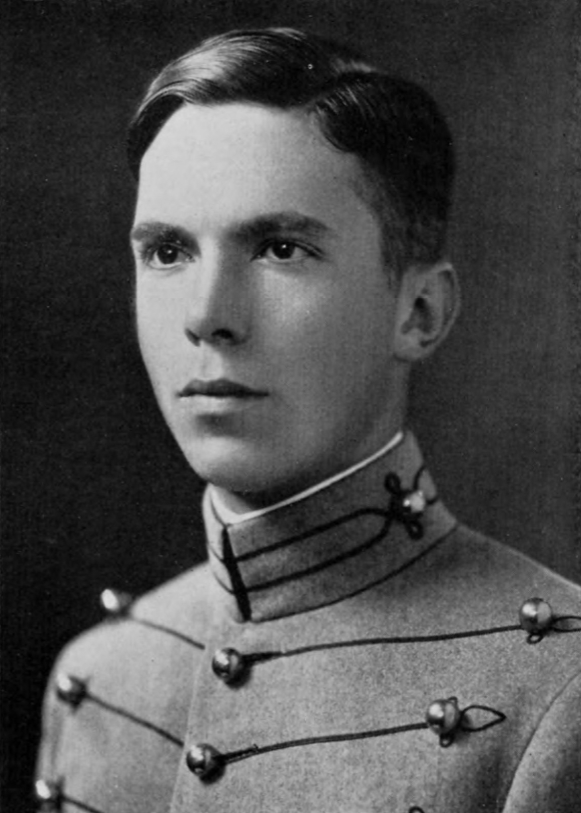
As a West Point cadet

Huglin was born in Fairfield, Iowa, on 22 September 1906. He was the eldest of three sons of John Albert Huglin, a lawyer, and his wife Clara Lenore née Porter. His two younger brothers, Harvey Porter and Henry Charles Huglin, also went to the United States Military Academy at West Point, New York, and also joined the United States Air Force. His paternal grandfather, Carl Alexander Quiskey, had served in the British Army before emigrating to the United States and had changed his name to Huglin when he enlisted in the United States Army during the American Civil War. Huglin attended Parsons College for a year before he entered West Point on 1 July 1925. He graduated on 13 June 1929, ranked 56th in his class, and was commissioned as a second lieutenant in the Field Artillery. He was assigned to the 2nd Battalion, 16th Field Artillery Regiment, at Fort Bragg, North Carolina.

Huglin volunteered for pilot training, and was a student officer at the Air Corps Primary Flying School at Randolph Field, Texas, from 1 July 1930 to 28 February 1931. He then attended the Air Corps Advanced Flying School at Kelly Field, Texas, from which he graduated on 13 October, rated as an Airplane Pilot and Airplane Observer. He was stationed at Langley Field, Virginia, with the 49th Bombardment Squadron, and formally transferred to the United States Army Air Corps on 22 December 1931. He became the assistant operations officer of the 2nd Bombardment Group until 31 August 1932, when he assumed command of a flight of the 16th Observation Squadron, also based there. When the Army was called upon to deliver air mail, he flew air mail routes from Miami, Florida, to Richmond, Virginia, and from Jacksonville, Florida, to Washington, DC, between February and April 1934. He was promoted to the rank of first lieutenant on 1 October 1934.

In June 1935, he was posted to Nichols Field in the Philippines, where he served with the 2nd Observation Squadron. He married Florence Fuqua from Roanoke, Virginia, in 1936; she travelled to the Philippines for the wedding. They had a daughter, Judith, and two sons, Robin and John, but later divorced. On returning to United States, he joined the 32nd Bombardment Squadron at March Field, California. From 1 June to 26 August 1939, he was a student at the Air Corps Tactical School. While there he was promoted to captain on 13 June 1939. After graduation, he became the Materiel Officer of the 3rd Attack Group at Barksdale Field, Louisiana.

== World War II ==
Huglin commanded the 90th Bombardment Squadron from 1 June to 16 December. It was initially based at Barksdale Field, but moved to Army Air Base Savannah on 6 October. He was the assistant operations officer of the 3d Bombardment Group, with the rank of major from 15 March 1941. On 1 September 1941, he became the assistant G-3 (operations officer) at GHQ Air Force at Bolling Field in Washington, DC. He was promoted to lieutenant colonel on 5 January 1942 and colonel on 1 March 1942. He became the chief of the Training Division in the Directorate of Bombardment at Air Corps headquarters in Washington, DC, in March 1942.

In February 1943, Huglin went to England, where he was the Assistant Chief Of Staff, A-3, of the 3rd Bombardment Wing. He commanded the 100th Bombardment Group from 6 June to 2 July 1943. He was Chief of Staff of the 13th Combat Bombardment Wing from 14 to 24 September 1943, and commanded it from 25 September to 1 December 1943. He then commanded the 4th Combat Bombardment Wing from 2 December 1943 to 25 January 1944, the 92nd Bombardment Wing from 26 January to 19 November 1944, and the 13th Combat Bomb Wing again from 20 November 1944 to 17 July 1945. He was promoted to brigadier general on 23 January 1945. For his service in Europe with the Eighth Air Force, during which he flew nine combat missions, he was awarded the Silver Star, the Legion of Merit, the Distinguished Flying Cross, the Bronze Star Medal, the Air Medal and the Commendation Ribbon with two oak leaf clusters. His citation for the Distinguished Flying Cross read:

For extraordinary achievement while serving as Commander in the Air of a Wing of B-17 aircraft on a heavy bombardment mission against the enemy over Germany, 5 August 1944. The Target on this very deep penetration into enemy territory was an important aircraft and motor works plant at Magdeburg, Germany. Under Colonel Huglin's efficient direction, wing assembly was made and a superior formation maintained throughout the mission. Intense, accurate anti-aircraft fire was encountered over Magdeburg, but despite this and the added difficulty of clouds obscuring the target, Colonel Huglin led his formation directly to the target. The success obtained on this operation was largely due to the superb leadership of Colonel Huglin. His action on this occasion reflects the highest credit upon himself and the Armed Forces of the United States.

== Post-war ==
Huglin was the deputy commander of the 3rd Air Division from 18 July to 12 November 1945. He was deputy chief of staff of U.S. Air Forces in Europe at Wiesbaden Air Base in Germany from 13 November 1945 to 26 February 1946, its chief of staff from 1 to 17 March, assistant chief of staff, A-3 from 18 March to 24 December, and deputy chief of staff from 25 December 1946 to 27 January 1947. He married Desiree Cooper of Surrey, England, in 1947.

Returning to the United States in February 1947, Huglin became the deputy commanding general and chief of staff of the Air Transport Command at Gravelly Point, Virginia. On 25 June 1948, he became the commander of the 530th Air Transport Wing at Fairfield-Suisun Field, California. It became the 1501st Air Transport Wing on 1 October 1948. In June 1949 he became deputy commander of the Pacific Division of the Military Air Transport Service at Hickam Air Force Base, Hawaii, also becoming commander of the U.S. Air Forces in the Pacific, the United States Air Force component of the Pacific Command the following month.

In July 1952 Huglin returned to the Pentagon as the director of the Management Analysis Service in the Office of the Deputy Chief of Staff of the Air Force. On 1 August 1955, he became the director of the Planning Program Division in the Office of Defense Mobilization. He remained in this position until he retired in 1959. He was awarded an oak leaf cluster to his Legion of Merit for his service.

Huglin entered Duke University, from which he earned a master's degree in mathematics. He then moved to St Petersburg, Florida, where he died on 24 November 1975. His remains were interred in Arlington National Cemetery.

== Military decorations ==
Silver Star

Legion of Merit with oak leaf cluster

Distinguished Flying Cross

Bronze Star Medal

Air Medal

Commendation Ribbon with two oak leaf clusters

Distinguished Unit Citation

American Defense Service Medal

American Campaign Medal

European-African-Middle Eastern Campaign Medal with six campaign stars

World War II Victory Medal

National Defense Service Medal

Air Force Longevity Service Award with six oak leaf clusters

Légion d'honneur (Chevalier) (France)

Croix de guerre 1939–1945 with palm (France)

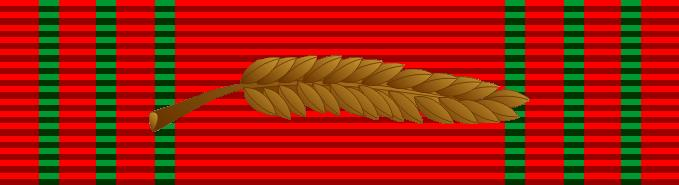
Croix de guerre 1939–1945 with palm (Belgium)

War Cross 1939–1945 (Czechoslovakia)

Commander of the Order of the British Empire (United Kingdom)

== Dates of rank ==
Insignia	Rank	Component	Date	Reference
	Second lieutenant	Field Artillery	13 June 1929	
	Second lieutenant	Air Corps	1 July 1930	
	First lieutenant	Air Corps	1 October 1934	
	Captain	Air Corps	14 May 1936	
	First lieutenant	Air Corps	2 June 1936	
	Captain	Air Corps	13 June 1939	
	Major	Army of the United States	15 March 1941	
	Lieutenant colonel	Army of the United States	5 January 1942	
	Colonel	Army of the United States	1 March 1942	
	Brigadier general	Army of the United States	23 January 1945	
	Major	Army Air Forces	13 June 1946	
	Colonel	United States Air Force	2 April 1948	
	Brigadier general	United States Air Force	30 June 1948	
	Brigadier general	Retired	1959	
