= 350th Air Refueling Squadron =

US Air Force unit

350th Air Refueling Squadron

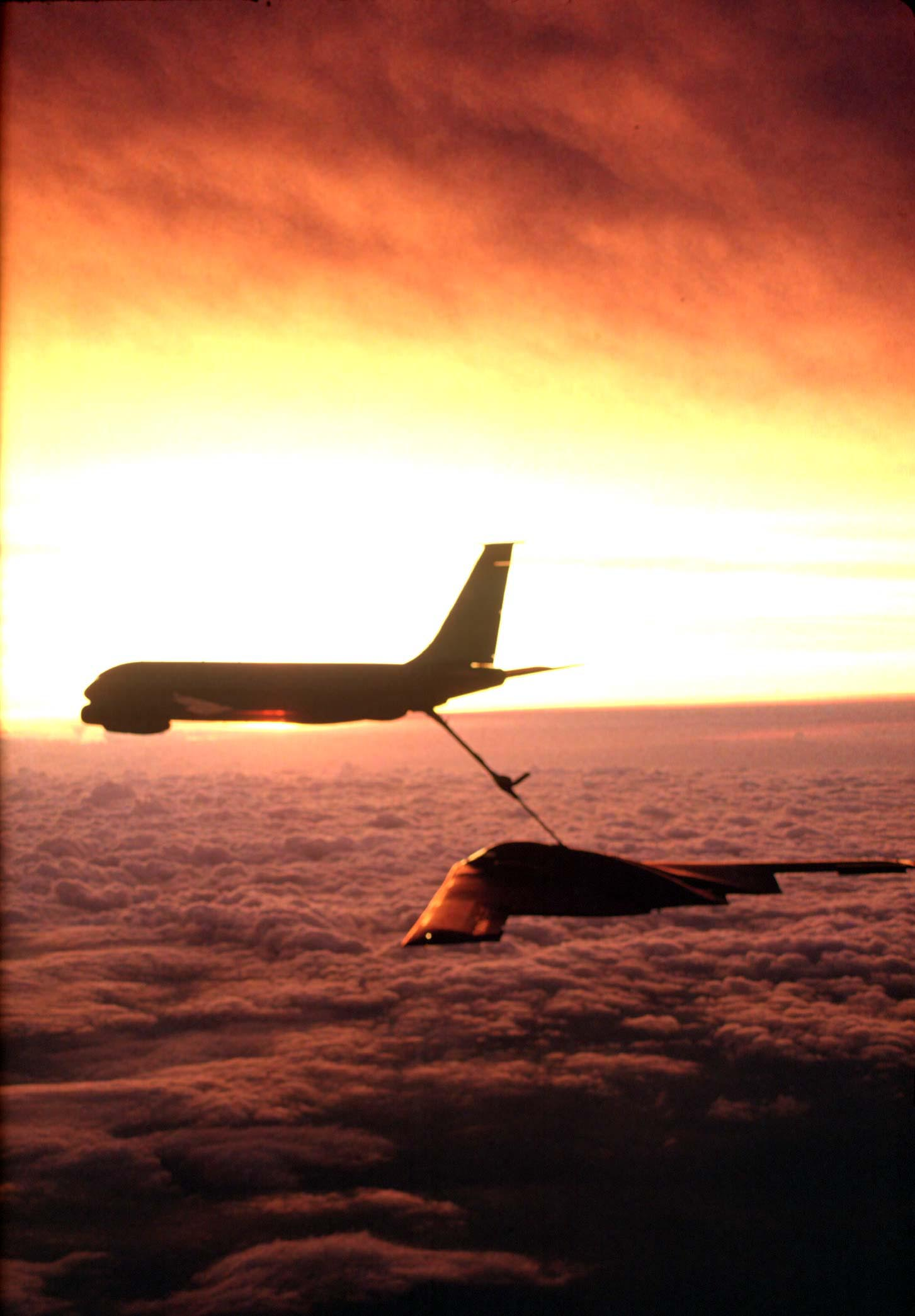
- A KC-135 Stratotanker from the 22nd Air Refueling Wing refuels a B-2 Stealth Bomber from the 509th Bomb Wing.
- Active: 1942–1945; 1947–1949; 1956–1976; 1982–present
- Country: United States
- Branch: United States Air Force
- Type: Squadron
- Role: Aerial refueling
- Part of: Air Mobility Command
- Garrison/HQ: McConnell Air Force Base
- Nickname: Red Falcons
- Engagements: WWII European Theater; Gulf War; War on terror
- Decorations: Distinguished Unit Citation; Air Force Meritorious Unit Award; Air Force Outstanding Unit Award with Combat "V" Device; Air Force Outstanding Unit Award; French Croix de Guerre with Palm

Insignia
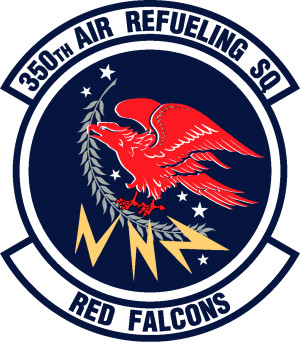
- 350th Air Refueling Squadron Emblem (Note: Approved 17 April 1959. Description: On an Air Force blue disc, a pattern of six white stars in bend, over all a red falcon in flight, outlines and details white, shadows Air Force blue, holding in his beak a long trailing green olive spray; radiating from the falcon's talons to base, three Air Force golden yellow lightning flashes; all within a white border.)

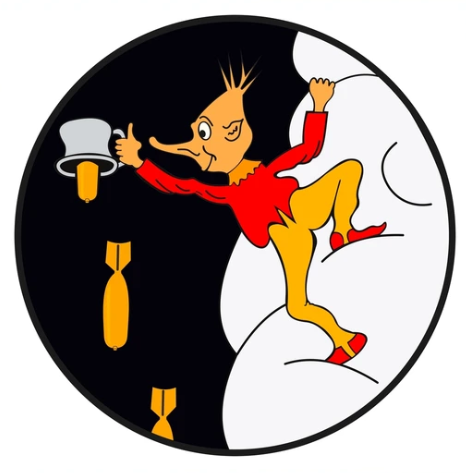
- 350th Bombardment Squadron emblem (World War II) (Note: The emblem depicts a gremlin dropping bombs out of a chamber pot and was the idea of Sgts Bowa, Hawkins, Hays, and Pvt Parker. Parker did the design work. Sheridan pp. 13–14.)

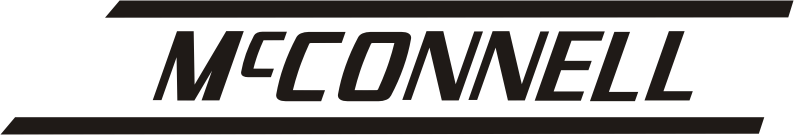
- Tail stripe
- World War II ETO fuselage code: LN

The 350th Air Refueling Squadron is a United States Air Force unit assigned to the 22nd Air Refueling Wing at McConnell Air Force Base, Kansas. It operates Boeing KC-46 Pegasus aircraft conducting aerial refueling missions.

The squadron was activated as the 350th Bombardment Squadron during World War II as a heavy bomber unit. It served in combat in the European Theater of Operations, where it earned two Distinguished Unit Citations and the French Croix de Guerre with Palm for its actions. After V-E Day the squadron returned to the United States and was inactivated at the port of embarkation. The squadron was briefly active in the reserve from 1947 to 1949, but was not fully equipped or manned.

It was activated in 1956 with Strategic Air Command as a medium bomber unit and stood alert at Pease Air Force Base until late 1965 with Boeing B-47 Stratojets. In 1966 it moved to Davis-Monthan Air Force Base, where, as the 350th Strategic Reconnaissance Squadron, it flew worldwide reconnaissance missions until 1976. In 1982, it was again activated as an air refueling squadron. It participated in Operation Desert Storm and has deployed to support United States military operations.

== Mission ==
To organize, train and equip to provide global mobility, 24 hours per day, 7 days per week.

== History ==
=== World War II ===
==== Organization and training for combat ====
The squadron was activated at Orlando Army Air Base, Florida on 1 June 1942 as one of the four original squadrons of the 100th Bombardment Group, It was intended to equip the squadron with Consolidated B-24 Liberators. The Army Air Forces (AAF) decided to concentrate heavy bomber training under Second Air Force, and before the end of June, the squadron moved to Pendleton Field, Oregon. Its intended equipment changed to Boeing B-17 Flying Fortresses.

As a result, the squadron only began organizing in October 1942, when the initial cadre of the ground echelon (4 officers and 27 enlisted men) were assigned after it had moved to Gowen Field, Idaho. Two days later, the squadron departed for Walla Walla Army Air Base, Washington for Phase I training. There the first aircrew arrived on 1 December 1942 and it received its first operational aircraft and began training. In February 1943, the ground echelon went to Kearney Army Air Field, Nebraska, while the air echelon went to Ainsworth, Casper and Scottsbluff Army Air Fields, where they acted as instructors training other units for the next three months.

The 350th completed its training and departed Kearney Army Air Field, Nebraska for the European Theater of Operations on 1 May 1943. the air echelon returned to Wendover Field, and would not be reunited with the ground echelon until arriving in England in June. The ground echelon proceeded by rail to Camp Kilmer, then sailed on the RMS Queen Elizabeth on 28 May, arriving at Greenock, Scotland on 3 June, while the air echelon flew via the northern ferry route to England about 21 May 1943.

==== Combat in the European Theater ====
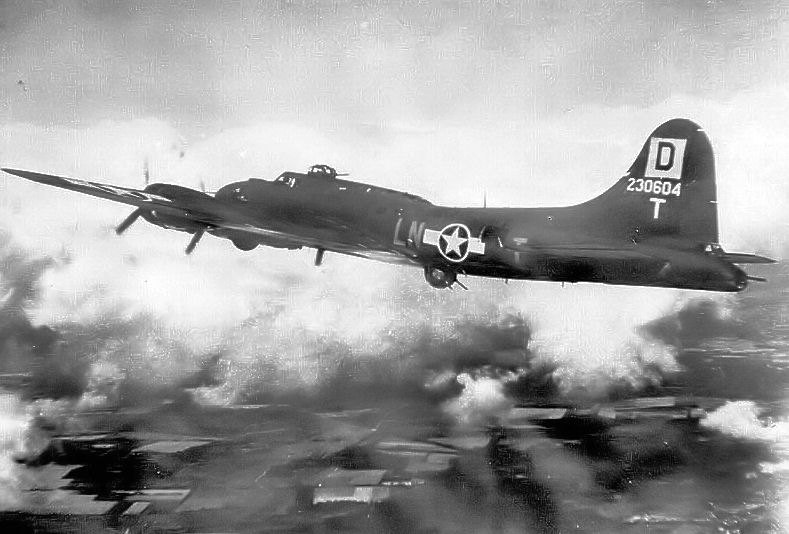
Squadron B-17 on a combat mission (Note: Aircraft is Boeing B-17F-110-BO, serial 42-30604, Badger's Beauty V. It flew 22 missions before crash landing in France on 4 October 1943. Six of the ten crewmembers survived and became prisoners of war. Baugher, Joe (10 April 2023). "1942 USAF Serial Numbers". Joe Baugher., Missing Aircrew Report 843.)

The squadron established itself at its combat station, RAF Thorpe Abbotts, on 9 June 1943, flying its first combat mission against Bremen on 25 June. Until the end of the war, the squadron was primarily employed in the strategic bombing campaign against Germany. Until January 1944, it concentrated its operations on airfields in France, and industrial targets and naval facilities in France and Germany. On 17 August 1943, it participated in an attack on a factory manufacturing Messerschmitt Bf 109 fighters in Regensburg, Germany, which seriously disrupted production of that plane. Although the mission called for fighter escort, the fighter group assigned to protect the squadron's formation missed the rendezvous and the wing formation proceeded to the target unescorted. Enemy fighter opposition focused on the low "box", formed in part by the squadron. Ten of the 21 Flying Fortresses flown by the 100th Group were lost on this mission. Unknown to AAF intelligence at the time, the attack also destroyed almost all of the fuselage construction equipment for Germany's secret Me 262 jet fighter. Rather than returning to England, the unit turned south and recovered at bases in North Africa. For this action, the squadron was awarded the Distinguished Unit Citation (DUC).

From January to May 1944, the 350th attacked airfields, industrial targets, marshalling yards, and missile sites in Western Europe. During Big Week, it participated in the concentrated attack on the German aircraft industry. In March, it conducted a series of long range attacks against Berlin, for which it was awarded a second DUC. The raid of 6 March was to be the costliest mission flown by Eighth Air Force during the war. German fighter controllers detected that the formation including the squadron was unprotected by fighter escorts and concentrated interceptor attacks on it. Twenty-three B-17s from the formation failed to return. (Note: In addition to the squadrons of the 100th Group, the formation included those of the 95th Bombardment Group.) Two days later, German fighters shot down the leader of the 45th Combat Bombardment Wing, and the 100th Group took the lead in another attack on Berlin. From the summer of 1944, the 350th concentrated on German oil production facilities.

The squadron was occasionally diverted from strategic bombing to perform interdiction and air support missions. It attacked bridges and gun positions to support Operation Overlord, the landings at Normandy in June 1944. In August and September it supported Operation Cobra, the breakout at Saint Lo, and bombed enemy positions in Brest. As Allied forces drove across Northern France toward the Siegfried Line in October and November, it attacked transportation and ground defenses. During the Battle of the Bulge in December 1944 and January 1945, it attacked lines of communication and fortified villages in the Ardennes. It provided support for Operation Varsity, the airborne assault across the Rhine in March 1945. The squadron was awarded the French Croix de Guerre with Palm for attacks on heavily defended sites and dropping supplies to the French Forces of the Interior.

The squadron flew its last mission on 20 April 1945. Following, V-E Day, the squadron was initially programmed to be part of the occupation forces in Germany, but that plan was cancelled in September, and between October and December, the squadron's planes were ferried back to the United States or transferred to other units in theater. Its remaining personnel returned to the United States in December and the squadron was inactivated at the Port of Embarkation on 19 December 1945.

==== "Bloody Hundredth" ====
Starting with the Regensburg mission of August 1943, the squadrons of the 100th Bombardment Group began suffering losses among the highest in VIII Bomber Command. On 8 October, it lost seven aircraft on a raid on Bremen, including its lead and deputy lead aircraft. Only two days later, it lost twelve aircraft on an attack on Münster, again including the lead aircraft. The only group plane returning from that mission had lost two engines and had two wounded on board. (Note: This plane, named Rosie's Riveter was lost in the spring of 1945, but its crew was able to bail out in Russian held territory.) Its highest one day loss occurred on the 6 March 1944 attack on Berlin, when 15 bombers failed to return, ten from the 350th Bombardment Squadron. On 11 September 1944, the Luftwaffe put up its heaviest opposition in months, destroying 11 of the group's bombers. On 31 December 1944, half the 1st Bombardment Division's losses consisted of a dozen 100th bombers. With a group authorization of 40 B-17s, it lost 177 planes to enemy action. It became a legend for these losses and was referred to as the "Bloody Hundredth."

=== Cold War ===
==== Reserve organization ====
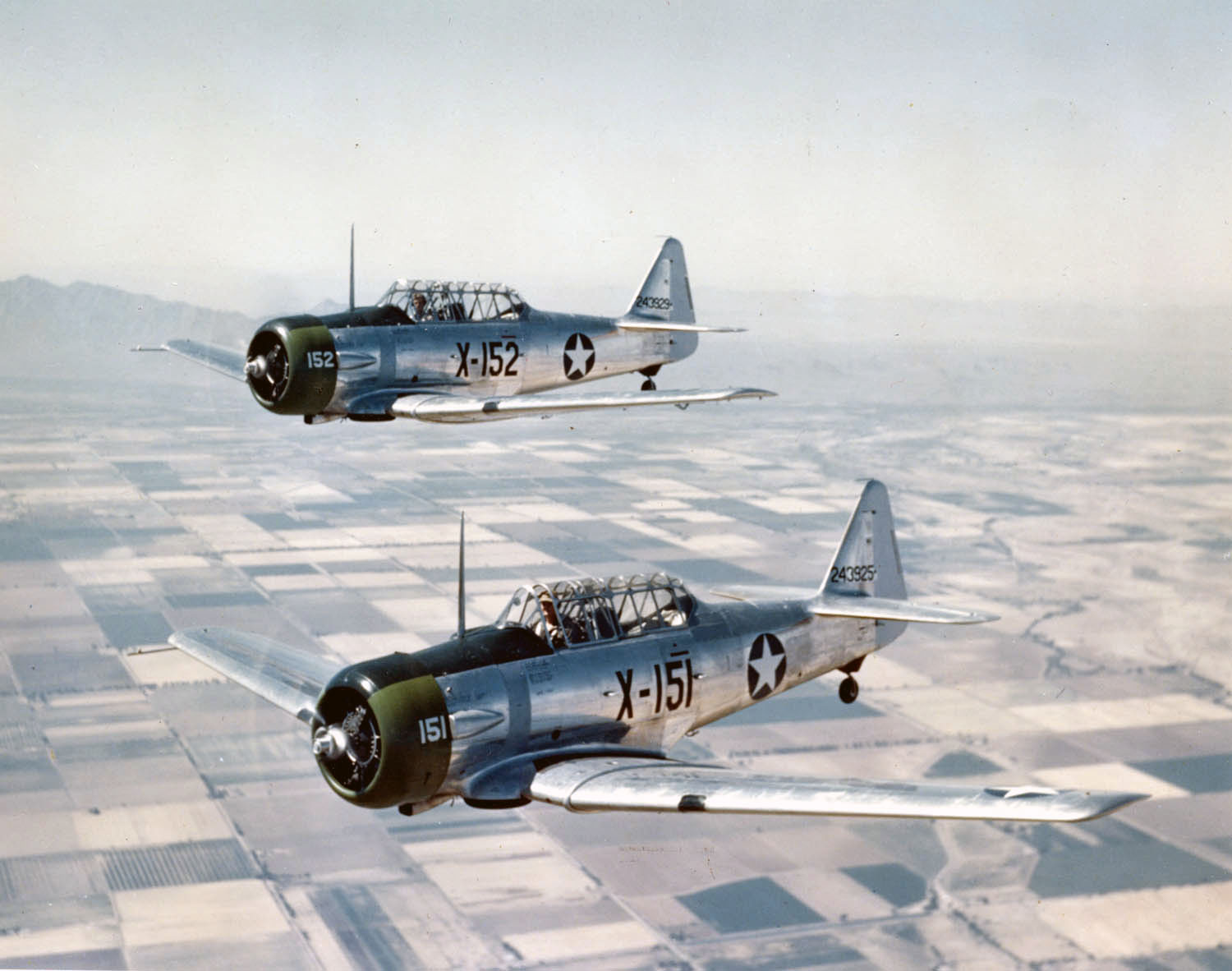
T-6 Texans as flown by the squadron in the reserve

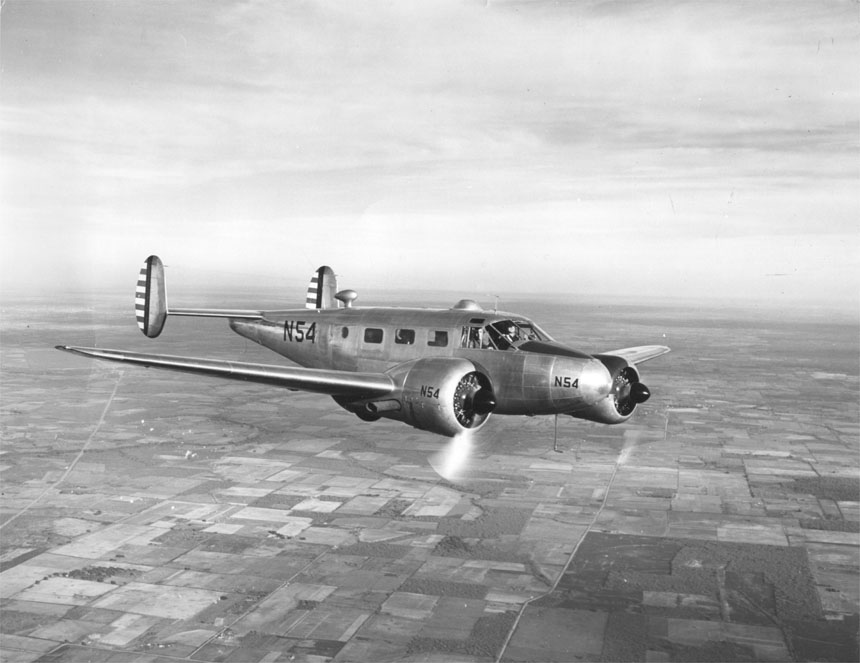
A Beechcraft AT-7as flown by the squadron in the reserve

The squadron was activated under Air Defense Command (ADC) in the reserve at Columbia Army Air Base, South Carolina on 16 July 1947 and was again assigned to the 100th Group, which was located at Miami Army Air Field, Florida. As the post war Air Force took shape, the National Guard was considered the first line of reserve. Reserve units like the 350th got what was left over after National Guard units received facilities, equipment and aircraft. Aircraft were allotted to reserve units as a means of maintaining flying proficiency, not combat readiness. Aircraft assigned to the reserves were overwhelmingly trainers, and no heavy bombers were ever assigned. The allotment of units to the reserves was made only for planning purposes and mobilization plans called for personnel assigned to the 350th to be called to active duty during mobilization as individuals, not as a unit.

In 1948, Continental Air Command assumed responsibility for managing reserve and Air National Guard units from ADC. President Truman’s reduced 1949 defense budget required reductions in the number of Air Force units. In May 1949, the Air Force reorganized its operational reserve forces into 25 wings located at 23 reserve training centers, a reduction of 18 training centers. As a result, the 350th was inactivated as reserve flying operations at Columbia ceased.

==== Strategic Air Command ====
===== Strategic bombardment =====
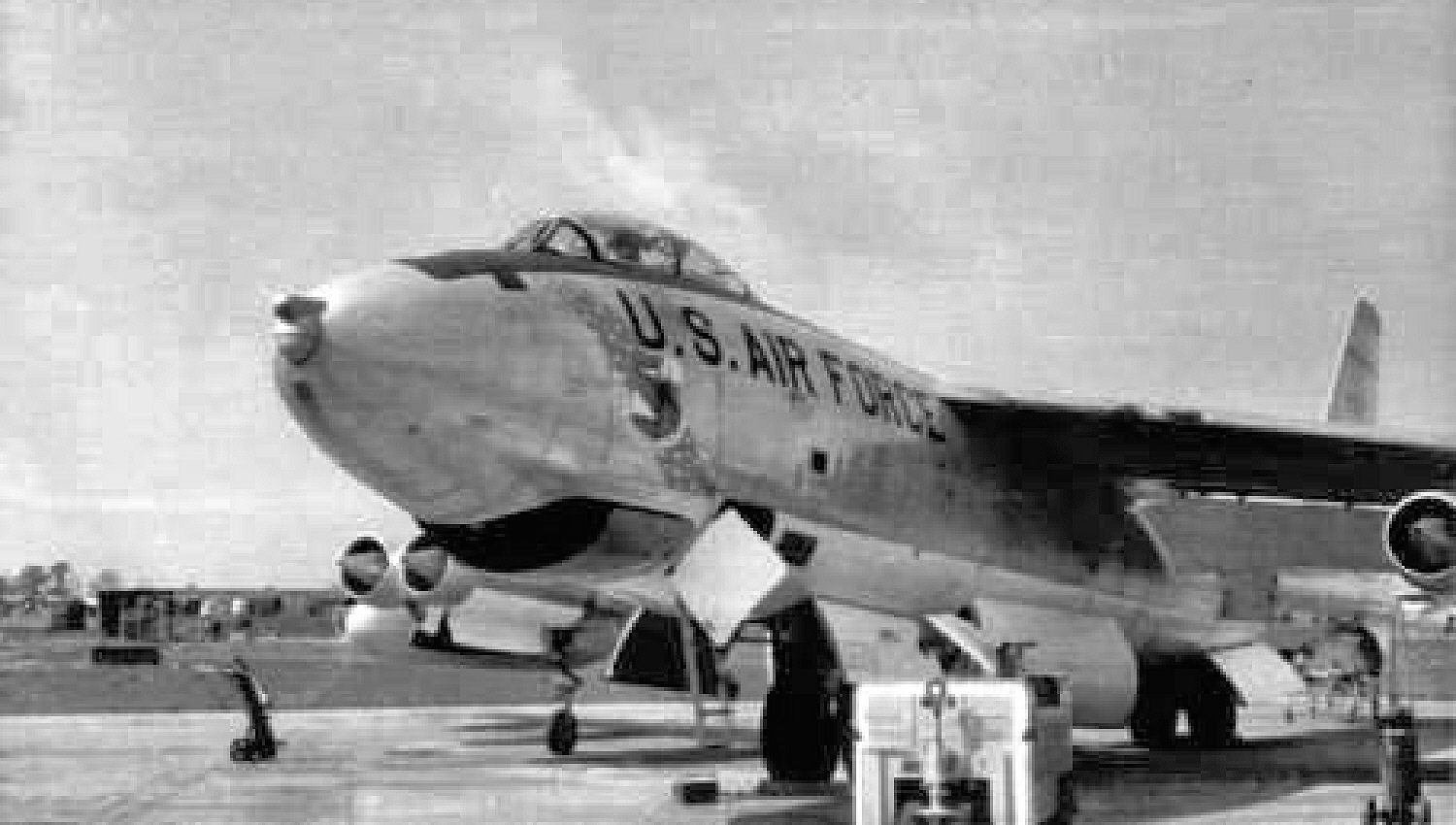
100th Wing B47 parked at a dispersal base

The squadron was activated at the start of 1956 as Strategic Air Command (SAC) opened Portsmouth Air Force Base, where it began to equip with Boeing B-47 Stratojets. From December 1957 until April 1958, it deployed to RAF Brize Norton, along with the rest of the 100th Bombardment Wing. From April through May 1958, the squadron deployed to Torrejon Air Base, Spain in one of the last B-47 deployments prior to Operation Reflex operations. Starting in 1958, the squadron began to assume an alert posture at its home station, now Pease Air Force Base, reducing the amount of time spent on alert at overseas bases. General Thomas S. Power had set an initial goal of maintaining one third of SAC’s planes on fifteen minute ground alert, fully fueled and ready for combat to reduce vulnerability to a Soviet missile strike. This was increased to half the squadron's aircraft in 1962.

Soon after detection of Soviet missiles in Cuba, all SAC's degraded and adjusted alert sorties were brought up to full capability. SAC B-47s dispersed on 22 October. Most dispersal bases were civilian airfields with AF Reserve or Air National Guard units. B-47s were configured for execution of the Emergency War Order as soon as possible after dispersal. KC-97s were dispersed to Goose Air Base, Lajes Air Base and Harmon Air Force Base to provide refueling for the B-47s on increased alert status. On 15 November 1/6 of the squadron's dispersed B-47s were recalled to Pease. On 21 November SAC went to DEFCON 3. The squadron's remaining dispersed B-47s were recalled to Pease on 24 November. On 27 November it returned to normal alert posture.

The squadron continued operations until the end of 1965, when it began to phase down with the retirement of the B-47 from SAC. The squadron ceased all operations on 12 February 1966.

===== Strategic reconnaissance =====
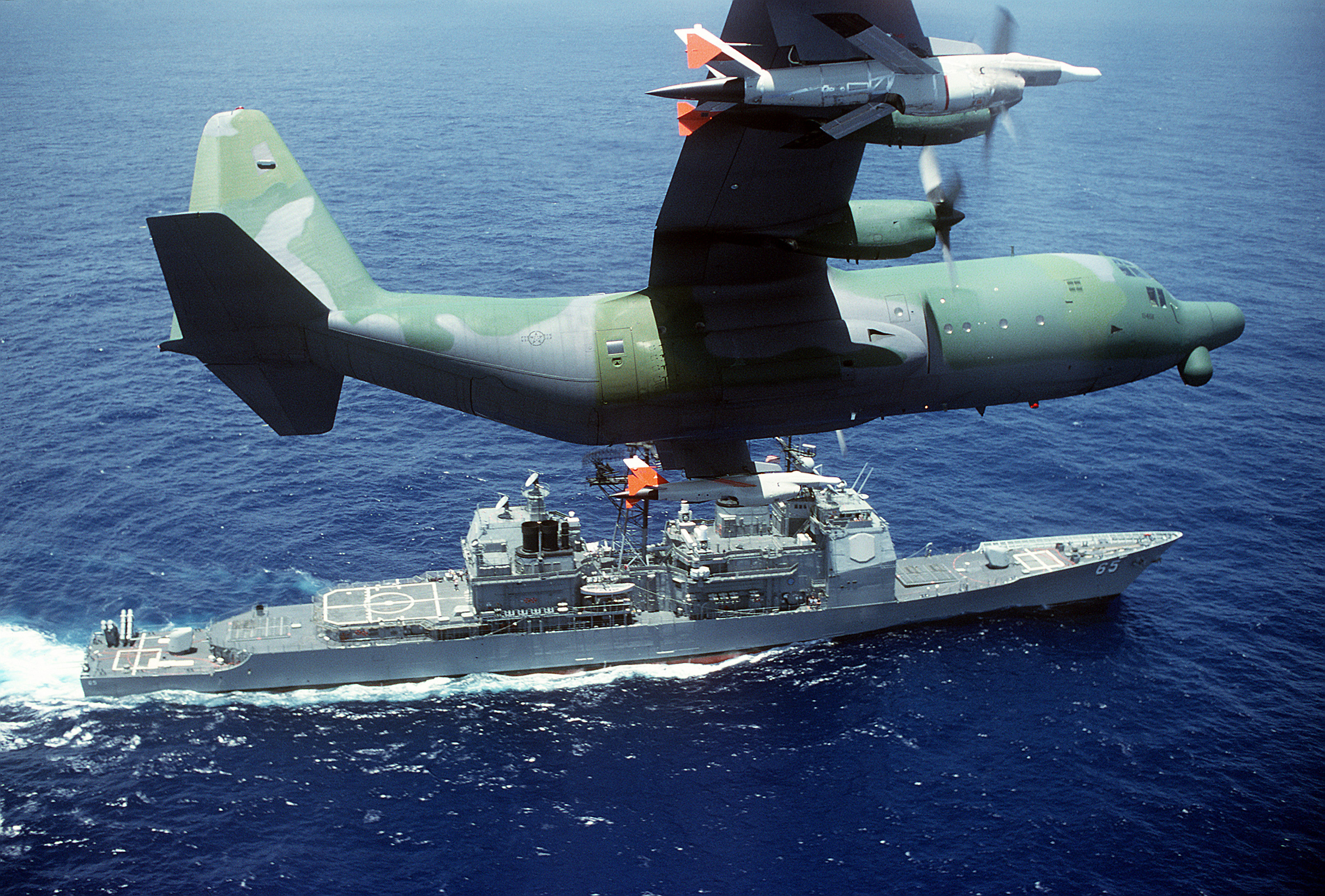
A Lockheed DC-130 carrying a pair of AQM-34 Firebee drones over the USS Chosin

On 25 June 1966, the squadron moved without personnel or equipment to Davis-Monthan Air Force Base, where it was redesignated the 350th Strategic Reconnaissance Squadron and absorbed the personnel of the 4025th Strategic Reconnaissance Squadron, which was simultaneously discontinued. It operated Ryan AQM-34 Firebee reconnaissance drones launched from DC-130 Hercules aircraft and recovered by Sikorsky CH-3 helicopters The squadron conducted global reconnaissance missions, often providing aircraft to overseas operating locations of its parent 100th Strategic Reconnaissance Wing.

In the second half of 1966, the growing threat to manned reconnaissance missions from SA-2 surface to air missiles lead to the increased use of the squadron's photographic reconnaissance Ryan Firebees (Note: Through most of the 1960s, Firebee reconnaissance drones were referred to by the manufacturer's model number. The Department of Defense designation was given in 1969. Cahill, p. 16.) over North Vietnam, operated from Bien Hoa Air Base in Operation Blue Springs (later Operation Bumble Bug, then Bumpy Action). The majority of these missions were flown with the low altitude Ryan 147J. Others were flown with the 147H and 147J high altitude models designed to locate SA-2 launch sites. Drones on these missions were often accompanied by other model 147s designed as decoys. Except for a pause between March 1968 and October 1969, missions were also flown over southern China. MiG-21s were a threat to the Firebees, although support from RC-135 ELINT aircraft enabled directors aboard the DC-130s to take limited evasive action

In 1969 North Vietnamese MiG-21s expanded operation to Laotian airspace, and director DC-130s operating there began to receive fighter cover. On 4 July 1970, Operating Location 20, 100th Strategic Reconnaissance Wing at Bien Hoa shut down and SAC reconnaissance operations in Southeast Asia moved to Operating Location RU, 100th Strategic Reconnaissance Wing at U-Tapao Royal Thai Navy Airfield, Thailand, although drone recovery operations still occurred over the Gulf of Tonkin and the CH-3 helicopters performing those operations remained at Da Nang Air Base, on the northern coast of South Viet Nam. In July 1971, two of the three high altitude Firebees operating over North Vietnam were shot down, and their mission was transferred to Lockheed SR-71 Blackbirds The operational tempo of the drones increased in 1972 with Operation Linebacker II, calling for target selection photography and bomb damage assessment in the Hanoi and Haiphong area. U-Tapao operations were transferred to the 99th Strategic Reconnaissance Squadron on 1 November 1972.

The squadron inactivated in July 1976, transferring its personnel and equipment to the 22d Tactical Drone Squadron as Tactical Air Command (TAC) took over drone reconnaissance operations from SAC. TAC had already been operating Firebees equipped for chaff and propaganda leaflet dispersal. (Note: Toward the end of the Vietnam war, 350th DC-130s had launched 28 TAC AQM-34H leaflet sorties. Cahill, p. 19.)

==== Air refueling ====
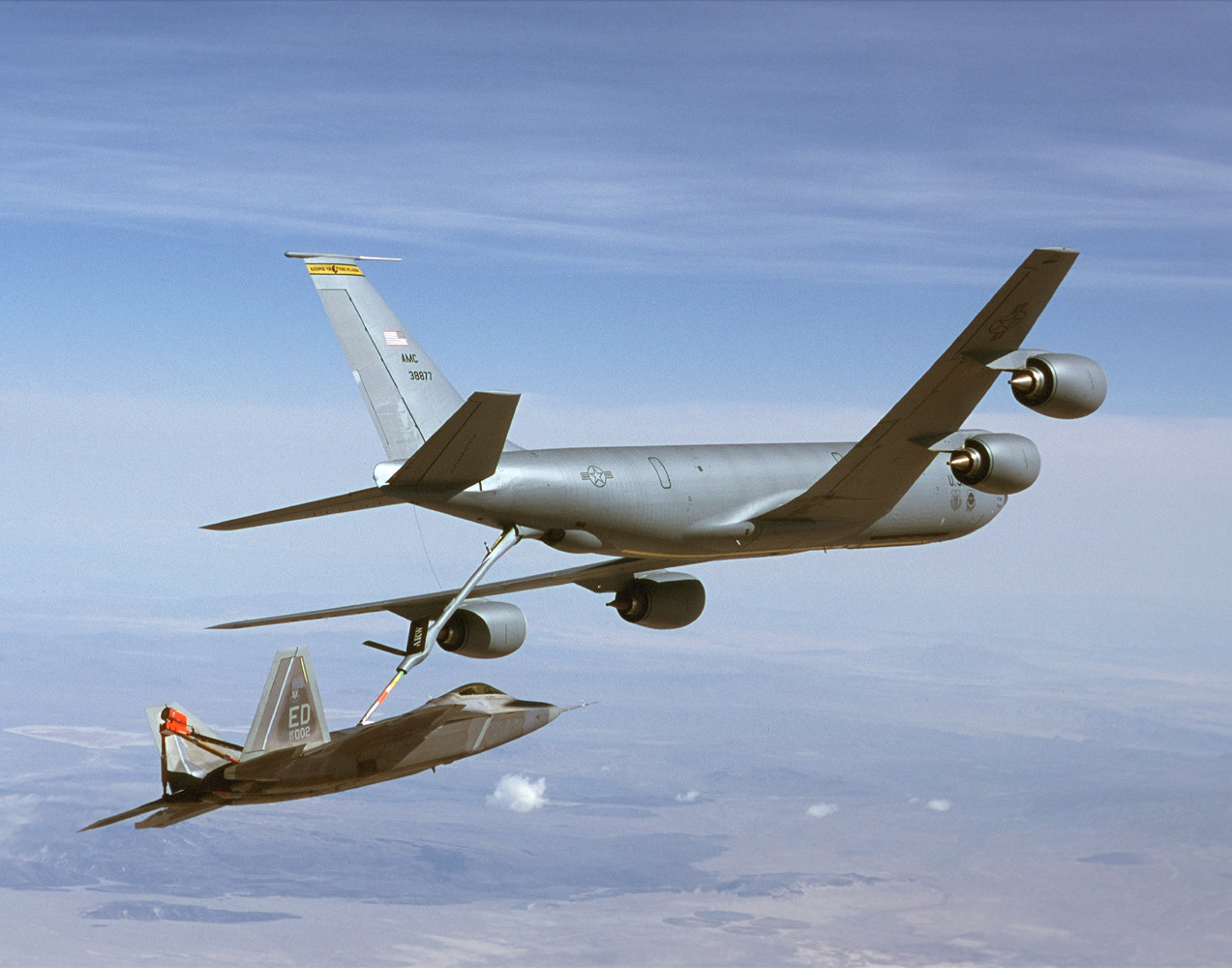
A KC-135 Stratotanker from the 22nd Air Refueling Wing refuels an F-22

The squadron was redesignated the 350th Air Refueling Squadron in January 1982 and assigned to the 100th Air Refueling Wing at Beale Air Force Base, California. In March 1983, when the 100th Wing inactivated, it was equipped with Boeing KC-135Q Stratotankers, specially modified to refuel SR-71s and reassigned to the 9th Strategic Reconnaissance Wing. During Operation Desert Storm, the squadron provided cargo and air refueling support to combat units in Southwest Asia from August 1990 through March 1991.

In September 1991, SAC implemented the Objective Wing reorganization and the squadron became part of the 9th Operations Group. Shortly thereafter SAC was inactivated, and the 9th Wing was transferred to Air Combat Command on 1 June 1992. As Air Mobility Command assumed responsibility for air refueling, the 350th was reassigned to the 43d Operations Group, located at Malmstrom Air Force Base, Montana, although it remained at Beale. On 1 January 1994, The 22nd Air Refueling Wing relocated to McConnell Air Force Base, Kansas, as part of the Air Force's plan to return McConnell to an air refueling hub. As the 22nd Wing built up, the 350th moved to McConnell and was assigned to the 22nd Operations Group on 1 July.

In 1997, the Republic of Singapore Air Force (RSAF) selected McConnell as the training base for its KC-135 crews and maintenance personnel. The RSAF stationed two of their Stratotankers at McConnell, naming the organization the Peace Guardian Detachment. From 1998 to 2003, the RSAF maintained a 300-person detachment at McConnell and trained with the 350th on air refueling techniques, tactics, and general airmanship.

After the September 11, 2001 terrorist attacks against the United States, the 22nd Air Refueling Wing deployed tanker crews in support of Operation Noble Eagle. Before the end of the year, McConnell tankers were sent to the Middle East, Central Asia, Horn of Africa, and other locations to provide air refueling support during Operation Enduring Freedom. Beginning in 2003, the wing took an active role in Operation Iraqi Freedom as tanker crews deployed to the Arabian Peninsula.

From 1 April to 1 October 2024, the squadron was the major force provider for the 350th Expeditionary Air Refueling Squadron at an unnamed base in the Middle East. From 13 to 16 April, the squadron refueled aircraft defending against Iran's attack on Israel. Seven members of the squadron were awarded the Distinguished Flying Cross for their efforts refueling aircraft responsible for the destruction of six ballistic missiles and 80 one-way attack unmanned aerial vehicles. The expeditionary unit flew 2275 combat sorties, two thirds of the refueling missions in the area, and was awarded an Air Force Meritorious Unit Award for its actions during this deployment. This was the last deployment of the squadron's KC-135s, upon their return the squadron began transitioning to the Boeing KC-46 Pegasus. (Note: Although the Air Force considers expeditionary units to be provisional and separate from their force provider units, honors earned by expeditionary units are conferred on the regular unit. AF Instruction 38-101, Manpower and Organization, para. 31.4)

== Lineage ==
- Constituted as the 350 Bombardment Squadron (Heavy) on 28 January 1942

Activated on 1 June 1942
Redesignated 350 Bombardment Squadron, Heavy on 20 August 1943
Inactivated on 15 December 1945

- Redesignated 350 Bombardment Squadron, Very Heavy on 9 July 1947

Activated in the Reserve on 16 July 1947
Inactivated on 27 June 1949

- Redesignated 350 Bombardment Squadron, Medium on 1 August 1955

Activated on 1 January 1956
Redesignated 350 Strategic Reconnaissance Squadron on 25 June 1966
Inactivated on 1 July 1976

- Redesignated 350 Air Refueling Squadron, Heavy on 19 January 1982

Activated on 28 January 1982
Redesignated 350 Air Refueling Squadron on 1 September 1991

=== Assignments ===
- 100th Bombardment Group: 1 June 1942 – 15 December 1945
- 100th Bombardment Group: 16 July 1947 – 27 June 1949
- 100th Bombardment Wing (later 100th Strategic Reconnaissance) Wing, 1 January 1956 – 1 July 1976 (attached to Sixteenth Air Force, 4 March 1958 – 4 April 1958
- 100th Air Refueling Wing, 28 January 1982
- 9th Strategic Reconnaissance Wing, 15 March 1983
- 9th Operations Group, 1 September 1991
- 43d Operations Group, 1 October 1993
- 22d Operations Group, 1 July 1994 – present

=== Stations ===
- Orlando Army Air Base, Florida 1 June 1942
- Barksdale Field, Louisiana, c. 18 June 1942
- Pendleton Field, Oregon c. 26 June 1942
- Gowen Field, Idaho, 28 August 1942
- Walla Walla Army Air Base, Washington, c. 1 November 1942
- Wendover Field, Utah, c. 30 November 1942
- Sioux City Army Air Base, Iowa, c. 28 December 1942
- Kearney AAF, Nebraska, c. 30 January 1943 – May 1943
- RAF Thorpe Abbotts (Station 139), England, 9 June 1943 – December 1945
- Camp Kilmer, New Jersey, c. 20 – 21 December 1945
- Columbia Army Air Base, South Carolina, 16 July 1947 – 27 June 1949
- Portsmouth Air Force Base (later Pease Air Force Base), New Hampshire, 1 January 1956 – 30 April 1966 (deployed to RAF Brize Norton, England 4 January 1958 – 4 March 1958 and to Torrejon Air Base, Spain 4 March 1958 – 4 April 1958
- Davis–Monthan Air Force Base, Arizona, 25 June 1966 – 1 July 1976
- Beale Air Force Base, California, 25 January 1982
- McConnell Air Force Base, Kansas, 1 July 1994 – present

=== Aircraft and Missile ===
- Boeing B-17 Flying Fortress, 1942–1945
- North American AT-6 Texan, 1947–1949
- Beechcraft AT-7 Navigator, 1947–1949
- Beechcraft AT-11 Kansan, 1947–1949
- Boeing B-47 Stratojet, 1956–1966
- Sikorsky CH-3, 1966–1976
- Lockheed DC-130 Hercules, 1966–1976
- Ryan 147 (later AQM-34) Firebee, 1966–1976
- Boeing KC-135 Stratotanker, 1982 – 2024
- Boeing KC-46 Pegasus, 2024 – present

=== Awards and campaigns ===
Award streamer	Award	Dates	Notes
	Distinguished Unit Citation	17 August 1943	Germany, 350th Bombardment Squadron
	Distinguished Unit Citation	4, 6, 8 March 1944	Berlin, Germany, 350th Bombardment Squadron
	Air Force Meritorious Unit Award	1 August 2009-31 July 2010	350th Air Refueling Squadron
	Air Force Meritorious Unit Award	1 August 2010-31 July 2011	350th Air Refueling Squadron
	Air Force Meritorious Unit Award	1 August 2011-31 July 2012	350th Air Refueling Squadron
	Air Force Meritorious Unit Award	1 August 2012-31 July 2013	350th Air Refueling Squadron
	Air Force Meritorious Unit Award	1 April–1 October 2024	350th Expeditionary Air Refueling Squadron
	Air Force Outstanding Unit Award with Combat "V" Device	1 July 1972–30 June 1973	350th Strategic Reconnaissance Squadron
	Air Force Outstanding Unit Award	1 July 1968–30 June 1970	350th Strategic Reconnaissance Squadron
	Air Force Outstanding Unit Award	1 July 1983–30 June 1984	350th Strategic Reconnaissance Squadron
	Air Force Outstanding Unit Award	1 July 1985–30 June 1986	350th Air Refueling Squadron
	Air Force Outstanding Unit Award	1 July 1986–30 June 1987	350th Air Refueling Squadron
	Air Force Outstanding Unit Award	1 July 1989–30 June 1990	350th Air Refueling Squadron
	350th Air Force Outstanding Unit Award	1 July–1 October 1993	350th Air Refueling Squadron
	Air Force Outstanding Unit Award	1 June 1994–31 May 1996	350th Air Refueling Squadron
	Air Force Outstanding Unit Award	1 August 1999–31 July 2000	350th Air Refueling Squadron
	Air Force Outstanding Unit Award	1 August 2000–31 July 2001	350th Air Refueling Squadron
	Air Force Outstanding Unit Award	1 August 2002–31 July 2004	350th Air Refueling Squadron
	Air Force Outstanding Unit Award	1 August 2004–31 July 2005	350th Air Refueling Squadron
	Air Force Outstanding Unit Award	1 August 2006–31 July 2008	350th Air Refueling Squadron
	Air Force Outstanding Unit Award	1 August 2008–31 July 2009	350th Air Refueling Squadron
	Air Force Outstanding Unit Award	1 August 2009–31 July 2010	350th Air Refueling Squadron
	Air Force Outstanding Unit Award	1 August 2012–31 July 2013	350th Air Refueling Squadron
	Air Force Outstanding Unit Award	1 August 2013–31 July 2014	350th Air Refueling Squadron
	French Croix de Guerre with Palm	25 June 1944 –31 December 1944	350th Bombardment Squadron

Campaign Streamer	Campaign	Dates	Notes
	Air Offensive, Europe	2 June 1943 – 5 June 1944	350th Bombardment Squadron
	Air Combat, EAME Theater	2 June 1943 – 11 May 1945	350th Bombardment Squadron
	Normandy	6 June 1944 – 24 July 1944	350th Bombardment Squadron
	Northern France	25 July 1944 – 14 September 1944	350th Bombardment Squadron
	Rhineland	15 September 1944 – 21 March 1945	350th Bombardment Squadron
	Ardennes-Alsace	16 December 1944 – 25 January 1945	350th Bombardment Squadron
	Central Europe	22 March 1944 – 21 May 1945	350th Bombardment Squadron
	Defense of Saudi Arabia	2 August 1990–16 January 1991	350th Air Refueling Squadron
	Liberation and Defense of Kuwait	17 January 1991–11 April 1991	350th Air Refueling Squadron

== See also ==
- List of United States Air Force squadrons
- List of United States Air Force air refueling squadrons
- B-17 Flying Fortress units of the United States Army Air Forces
- List of B-47 units of the United States Air Force
- List of C-130 Hercules operators
