= Donald L. Miller =

American historian (born 1944)

- Education: Saint Vincent College (BA); University of Maryland (PhD)
- Occupations: Professor; historian; author
- Notable work: Supreme City (2014); Masters of the Air (2007); City of the Century (1996)
- Website: DonaldMillerBooks.com

Donald L. Miller (born 1944) is an American biographer and historian. He is the John Henry MacCracken Professor of History emeritus at Lafayette College in Pennsylvania. He is also a New York Times bestselling author of seven books. He is a frequent consultant and adviser to historical productions, including those for PBS and HBO.

== Education and career ==
Miller received his PhD from the University of Maryland and joined the Lafayette College faculty in 1978. He has also taught at Cornell University's School for Industrial and Labor Relations, the Graduate Center of the City University of New York, and Oxford University. He is the recipient of an honorary degree of Doctor of Humane Letters from St. Vincent College and Outstanding Alumni awards from the University of Maryland and Ohio University.

Miller has also served as a writer and historical consultant for many productions, including WWII in HD (History Channel, 2009); American Experience: The Bombing of Germany (PBS, 2010); American Experience: Victory in the Pacific (PBS, 2005); A Biography of America (PBS); and several other programs on the History Channel.

In addition to his teaching and writing responsibilities, he was co-chair of the Planning Committee for the National D-Day Museum's International Conference on World War II, and is on the Board of Trustees Planning Committee for St. Vincent College. Following Hurricane Katrina, he appeared on CNN and National Public Radio and was quoted by a number of national publications, including The New York Times, for his writings on American and European urban disasters, including the Great Chicago Fire and the destruction of cities in Japan and Germany during World War II.

Miller has been the keynote speaker at events sponsored by professional, business, and academic audiences. Among the organizations he has spoken to include: IBM, AT&T, the Federal Reserve Bank (Chicago), The Chicago Historical Society, the Aspen Institute, the Television Critics Association, the New York State Assembly, and the World Trade Center, Chicago among others.

== Bibliography ==
Supreme City: How Jazz Age Manhattan Gave Birth to Modern America (The Washington Post, 2014): Supreme City charts Manhattan’s growth and transformation in the 1920s and the brilliant people behind it, from Walter Chrysler to founder of the CBS network William Paley and his rival, founder of NBC, David Sarnoff as well as Elizabeth Arden, her rival, Helena Rubenstein, and more. All shared a vaulting ambition and an intense desire to fulfill their dreams in New York. As mass communication emerged, the city moved from downtown to midtown through a series of engineering triumphs such as the Grand Central Terminal and the newly chic Park Avenue it created. In less than ten years Manhattan became the social, cultural, and commercial hub of the country. Supreme City transports readers to the 1920s, the Age of Jazz and the Age of Ambition.

City of the Century: The Epic of Chicago and the Making of America (Simon & Schuster, 1996): Miller explores Chicago’s growth from a desolate fur-trading post in the 1830s to one of the world's most explosively alive cities by 1900. He follows Chicago's wild beginnings, its reckless growth, its natural calamities (especially the Great Fire of 1871), its raucous politics, its empire-building businessmen, its world-transforming architecture, its rich mix of cultures, its community of young writers and journalists, and its staggering engineering projects—which included the reversal of the Chicago River and raising the entire city from prairie mud to save it from devastating cholera epidemics.

The Kingdom of Coal: Work, Enterprise, and Ethnic Communities in the Mine Fields (with Richard E. Sharpless, 1989): A survey of the rise and fall of the anthracite mining industry in Pennsylvania. Miller chronicles the discovery of anthracite, the building of canals to transport it to market, the era when anthracite was a major stimulus for the building of railroads and the development of the iron industry, the struggles of miners to organize, and the effects that successive waves of immigrants had on northeastern Pennsylvania.

Lewis Mumford: A Life (Grove, 1989): A biography of urban writer and intellectual Lewis Mumford. It was selected as a "Notable Book of the Year" (1989) by The New York Times.

Vicksburg: Grant's Campaign That Broke the Confederacy (Simon & Schuster, 2019): Vicksburg explores the military campaign that opened the Mississippi River and split the Confederacy.

== World War II books ==
=== Masters of the Air ===
Miller is widely acclaimed for his books on World War II, most notably the bestselling Masters of the Air: America’s Bomber Boys Who Fought the Air War Against Nazi Germany (Simon & Schuster, 2007). Drawn from interviews, oral histories, and other archives, Masters of the Air is an authoritative account of the USAAF bomber crews in World War II who brought the war to Hitler's doorstep as well as of life in wartime England and in the German prison camps, where tens of thousands of airmen spent part of the war.

==== Apple TV+ Miniseries ====
In 2013, HBO confirmed it was developing a miniseries produced by Steven Spielberg and Tom Hanks based upon Masters of the Air and focusing on the Eighth Air Force. Miller previously worked with Spielberg and Hanks as a historical consultant for the 10-part HBO series, The Pacific. He was also the on-camera historian, writer, and chief consultant for the series’ accompanying documentary. Little news about the series emerged after HBO confirmed it in 2013; an alleged teaser trailer was posted on YouTube in 2014, however project writer John Orloff said in a podcast that this teaser is not related to the upcoming miniseries. NME reported in March 2017 that production was progressing under the working title The Mighty Eighth and writers were scouting filming locations in England. In 2019, it was confirmed that Apple TV+ would produce the series and that it would focus on the 100th Bombardment Group of the Eighth Air Force. It premiered on January 26, 2024.

=== D-Days in the Pacific ===
D-Days in the Pacific (Simon & Schuster, 2004): The largest D-Day attack was the invasion of Okinawa on April 1, 1945, which brought together the biggest invasion fleet ever assembled, far larger than that engaged in the Normandy invasion. D-Days in the Pacific tells the story of the campaign waged by American forces to win back the Pacific islands from Japan. Based on eyewitness accounts by the combatants, it covers the entire Pacific struggle from the attack on Pearl Harbor to the dropping of atomic bombs on Hiroshima and Nagasaki.

Miller's research was used in the HBO miniseries The Pacific and won two Emmys for Outstanding Television Series and Outstanding Casting in 2010.

=== The Story of World War II ===
The Story of World War II with Henry Steele Commager (Simon & Schuster, 2001): Drawing on previously unpublished eyewitness accounts, Miller covers the horror and heroism of World War II in the words of the men who fought it, the journalists who covered it, and the civilians who were caught in its fury.

== Awards ==
Miller has won six awards for excellence in teaching, five fellowships from the National Endowment for the Humanities, and other awards including the Great Lakes National Book Award for Outstanding Book (2009), WWII Magazine; Victorian Society's Book of the Year, and the Van Artsdalen Award for Outstanding research. He was a resident scholar at All Souls College, Oxford, and was also named the Crayenborgh Lecturer at Leiden University, Netherlands.
