= List of military figures by nickname =

This is a list of military figures by nickname.

== 0–9 ==
- "31-Knot Burke" – Arleigh Burke, U.S. Navy destroyer commander (for being unable to meet his habitual maximum speed during one operation due to limited recent maintenance)
- "7, 8" – Yedi Sekiz Hasan Pasha, Ottoman Turkish Pasha who gained this nickname because of his signature consisting only of the Arabic letters seven (٧) and eight (٨)

== A ==
- "ABC" – Andrew Browne Cunningham, Second World War British admiral
- "ACE" – Ahmet Cem Ersever, Turkish Gendarmerie, and said to be one of the founders of the Gendarmerie's JITEM intelligence unit.
- "Acey" – Albert C. Burrows, World War II U.S. Navy submarine commander
- "Achmed" – Erich Bey, German Kriegsmarine admiral
- "Ajax" – Albert Baumler, Flying Tiger
- Alfonso Cano (nom de guerre) – Guillermo León Sáenz Vargas, the commander in chief of the Revolutionary Armed Forces of Colombia (FARC), 2008–2011.
- "Allegheny Johnson" or "Alleghany Johnson" – Edward Johnson, Confederate Army general
- "Assi" – Hans Hahn, German fighter pilot during World War II
- "Asker Aydoğan" (Turkish, Soldier Aydoğan) – Aydoğan Aydın, Turkish Major General
- "The Auk" – Claude Auchinleck, British Indian Army field marshal
- "The Angel warrior" – Angelo Polli, anti-Nazi Italian General Commander of Bersaglieri, first Italian high officer prisoner of the Nazi concentration camps captured on 9 September 1943 in Malles.
- "Autie" – George Custer, American army officer

== B ==
- "Baba Oruç" (Turkish, Father Aruj/Oruç) – Barbaros Oruç Reis, Turkish Corsair and Sultan of Algiers also known as "Barbarossa" alongside his little brother Barbaros Hayreddin Pasha
- "Babe" –
  - John H. Brown, World War II U.S. Navy submarine commander
  - Edward Heffron, American World War II paratrooper
  - Roderick Learoyd VC, World War II RAF bomber pilot
- "Bad Hand" – Ranald S. Mackenzie, U.S. Army general in the American Civil War and Indian Wars
- "Bad Old Man" – Jubal Early, Confederate Army general
- "Bai Di Jiangjun 白地将军" (Chinese, literally "White Ground General") – Xiahou Yuan, general serving under the warlord Cao Cao in the late Eastern Han dynasty, for his death at the Battle of Mount Dingjun while fixing damaged chevaux de frise instead of being in command; "Bai Di" may have referred to Xiahou Yuan's lowly upbringing and thus his approach to attending to everything personally
- "Bai Ma Jiangjun 白马将军" (Chinese, "White Horse General") –
  - Gongsun Zan, Eastern Han dynasty warlord, for his victories against the Wuhuan and Xianbei using his elite light cavalry force, the Bai Ma Yi Cong 白马义从 who solely rode white horses
  - Pang De, late Eastern Han dynasty general who served under numerous warlords, for always riding a white horse and landing an arrow on Guan Yu's forehead while doing so
- "Bai Mian Shu Sheng 白面书生" (Chinese, literally "White Faced Scholar") – Lu Xun, general and statesman of the state of Eastern Wu during the Three Kingdoms period, for his perceived inexperience and lack of military qualities
- "Bai Pao Jiangjun 白袍将军" (Chinese, literally "White Robed General") and like nicknames –
  - Chen Qingzhi, general of the Liang dynasty, for his prowess in the Battle of Xingyang
  - Xue Rengui, "Bai Yi Jiangjun 白衣将军" (Chinese, literally "White-Dressed General"), famous general of the early Tang dynasty, for the praise given by Emperor Taizong of Tang
- "Balaclava Ned" – Edwin Hughes, last survivor of the Charge of the Light Brigade
- "Baldy" –
  - Richard S. Ewell, Confederate Army general
  - Charles A. Pownall, American admiral in World War II
- "Bandito" – George S. Patton, Jr., American general in World War II
- "Barbara" – David G. M. Campbell, British general
- "Barbarossa" – Hızır Hayreddin Pasha, Regent of Algiers, Turkish Corsair and Grand Admiral (Kapudan Pasha) of Ottoman Navy
- "Barney" –
  - Harvey C. Barnum Jr., U.S. marine and Medal of Honor recipient
  - Clifton W. Flenniken, Jr., U.S. Navy submarine commander
  - William B. Sieglaff, U.S. Navy submarine commander
- "The Bart" – Philip Chetwode, British field marshal, commander in chief in India, and baronet (whence the nickname)
- "Batty Mac" – Archibald Cameron Macdonell, Canadian Army World War I general
- "Bazooka Charlie" – Charles Carpenter, American L-4 Grasshopper pilot who fitted bazookas to his airplane to attack German Tanks in WWII.
- "The Bear" – Norman Schwarzkopf Jr., United States Army general (the nickname he preferred over "Stormin' Norman")
- "The Bearded Man" – Frank Messervy, British Army general (because he tended not to shave in battle)
- "Beauty" – Harold M. Martin, U.S. Navy admiral
- "Benny" – Raymond H. Bass, World War II U.S. Navy submarine commander
- "Beetle" –
  - John P. Roach, U.S. Navy submarine commander
  - Walter Bedell Smith Chief of Staff to Dwight D. Eisenhower in World War II, US Ambassador to the Soviet Union, Director of Central Intelligence
- "Betty" – Harold Stark, U.S. Navy admiral (after a mistaken pledge)
- "Big Al, (The Sailor's Pal)" – Al Konetzni, American vice admiral
- "The Big Fella" or "The Big Fellow" – Michael Collins, Irish general
- "Big Minh" – Dương Văn Minh, Vietnamese general (for his height and bulk)
- "Big Simp" – William Hood Simpson, American U.S. Army General in World War II
- "Billy" –
  - Wiliam J. Hovde, USAAF figher ace in the 355th fighter group in World War II
  - William Mitchell, Army Air Service figure who advocated that bombers were superior to naval surface vessels.
- "Bimbo" – Miles Dempsey, British Second World War general
- "Bing" – Kenneth Cross, British Second World War RAF pilot
- "Bing Sheng 兵聖" (Chinese, literally "Soldier Saint") – Sun Wu, general, military strategist, and philosopher who served Wu in the Eastern Zhou period of ancient China
- "Birdy" – William Birdwood, British field marshal
- "Black Baron" – Michael Wittmann, German tank ace
- "Black Beast" – Mario Roatta, Italian general
- "Black Bob" – Robert Craufurd, British Army general
- "The Black Eagle" – Hubert Julian, Trinidadian colonel in the Imperial Ethiopian Air Force.
- "Black Jack" –
  - Frederick Galleghan, Australian Army World War II general
  - John J. Pershing, U.S. Army World War I general
- "Black Knight of the Confederacy" – Turner Ashby, Confederate Army general
- "Black Knight" – Gerd von Rundstedt, German Army field marshal
- "The Black Prince" = Edward of Woodstock, eldest son of Edward III of England, famed for his leadership in the Battle of Crécy and the Battle of Poitiers but also notorious for the massacre of the citizens of Limoges and other French cities.
- "The Black Rider" – Nikolaos Plastiras, Greek Army general and politician
- "Black Swallow of Death" – Eugene Bullard, African-American World War I fighter pilot
- "Blackie" – David John Williams, Canadian fighter ace
- "Blinker" – W. R. Hall, British admiral, head of Room 40 during the First World War
- "Blondie" –
  - Arnold Walker, RAF pilot
  - Herbert Hasler, Second World War Royal Marines officer
- "Blood" – J. A. L. Caunter, British general
- "Blood-n-Guts" – George S. Patton, Jr., American general in World War II (a nickname he rejected)
- "Bloody Bill" –
  - William T. Anderson, Confederate guerrilla leader
  - William Cunningham, Loyalist militia commander in South Carolina
- "Bloody George" – George Alan Vasey, Second World War Australian general
- "Bluey" – Keith Truscott, Second World War Australian fighter ace
- "Blutiger Ferdinand" ("Bloody Ferdinand") – Ferdinand Schörner, World War II German field marshal and convicted war criminal
- "Bobbie" – George W. E. J. Erskine, British general during the Second World War
- "Bobo" – Sigmund A. Bobczynski, World War II U.S. submarine commander
- "Bobs" – Frederick S. Roberts, British field marshal
- "Bobwire Bob" --- Robert C. Kingston, U.S. Army general, Korea-Vietnam
- "Bohemian corporal" – Adolf Hitler (used by Erich von Manstein)
- "Bohemian Private" (German: Böhmischer Gefreiter) – Adolf Hitler
- "Bomb-run John" – John G. Crommelin, American Naval Officer
- "Bomber" – Arthur T. Harris, British air chief marshal during the Second World War
- "Bombs Away LeMay" – Curtis LeMay, U.S. Air Force General
- "Boney" – Robert H. Close, World War II U.S. submarine commander
- "Boney" – J. F. C. Fuller, British tank advocate in World War I and military writer
- "Boo" – Elwyn King, First World War Australian fighter ace
- "Boom" – Hugh Trenchard, British officer responsible for the founding of the Royal Air Force.
- "Boots" – Frederick C. Blesse, American fighter ace
- "Boy" –
  - Frederick A. M. Browning, Second World War British airborne general
  - 'Peter Mould, Second World War Royal Air Force flying ace
- "Brad" – Omar Bradley, U.S. general
- "Breaker" – Harry Harbord Morant, Australian Boer War soldier and convicted war criminal
- "Brookie" – Alan Brooke, British World War II general & CIGS
- "Brute" – Victor H. Krulak, U.S. Marine Corps general
- "Bub" – Norvell G. Ward, U.S. ace submarine commander
- "Bubbles" – Sir William Milbourne James, British World War II admiral
- "Bubi" (German, "young boy", "kid") –
  - Erich Hartmann, German fighter ace
  - Alfred Schreiber, World War II German jet ace
- "Buck"
  - Elliot Buckmaster, Commanding Officer of the USS Yorktown during the Battle of Midway
  - Gale Cleven, American B-17 pilot in WWII
  - Lynn Compton, American World War II paratrooper officer
  - Robert McNair, Canadian fighter ace
- "Bucky" – John C. Egan, American B-17 pilot in WWII
- "Buckey" – William O'Neill, a Rough Rider officer who died in the Battle of San Juan Hill
- "Bud" –
  - Clarence Anderson, USAAF Fighter Ace in World War II
  - Harold W. Bowker, Canadian fighter ace
  - William P. Gruner, Jr., U.S. submarine commander
  - Walker Mahurin, USAAF fighter ace of World War II
  - Fitzroy Newsum, Tuskegee Airman
  - Elmo Zumwalt, United States Navy officer and the youngest person to serve as Chief of Naval Operations.
- "Buddy" – Lee Archer, Tuskegee Airman
- "Budget" – Henry Loyd, British WWII general
- "Bug" – John J. Roach, U.S. Navy officer
- "Bulgy" – Andrew Thorne, British World War II general
- "Bull" –
  - Denver Randleman, American World War II paratrooper
  - Leslie Allen, Australian Medic and recipient of the American Silver Star
  - Edmund Allenby, British First World War general
  - William Halsey, U.S. Navy admiral (a nickname he never used or answered to)
  - William Nelson, U.S. Navy admiral and Army general
  - Joseph M. Reeves, U.S. Navy admiral
  - William L. Wright, U.S. ace submarine commander
- "Bull of Scapa Flow" – Günther Prien, German World War II submarine ace (for his daring penetration of the British base)
- "Bull of the Woods" – James Longstreet, Confederate general
- "Bully" – Emil Lang, Luftwaffe fighter ace of World War II
- "Banjo" – Julian Byng, British First World War general
- "Buster" – Lionel Crabb, British frogman (after the swimmer)
- "Butch" –
  - Robert A. Barton, Canadian fighter ace
  - Orme C. Robbins, U.S. submarine commander
  - (from "butcher") Arthur T. Harris, British air force general (affectionately given by his men)
  - Edward O'Hare, U.S. World War II fighter ace and Medal of Honor recipient
  - Crosbie E. Saint, U.S. Army general
- "Butcher" – Arthur T. Harris, British air chief marshal during the Second World War
- "Butcher Bob" – Robert M. Hanson, US Marine Corps Fighter Ace in WWII
- "The Butcher of East Bengal" – General Tikka Khan, the Military Governor of East Pakistan who enforced Operation Searchlight that saw the brutal genocide of Bengali civilians in East Pakistan in the late hours of 25 March 1971. This genocide sparked the Bangladeshi War of Independence that resulted in the secession of East Pakistan as the newly independent People's Republic of Bangladesh.
- "The Butcher of Bosnia" – Ratko Mladić, Bosnian Serb military leader during the Bosnian War
- "The Butcher of Ethiopia" – Rodolfo Graziani, Italian Army general
- "The Butcher of Fezzan" – Rodolfo Graziani, Italian Army general
- "Butcher of the Somme" – Douglas Haig, British field marshal
- "Butcher of Ypres" – Berthold von Deimling, German general
- "Buyi Jiangjun 布衣将军" (Chinese, literally "Plainclothes General") – Fu Zuoyi, Chinese military leader widely praised for his defense of Suiyuan from the Japanese.
- "Buzz"
  - Edwin Aldrin, Colonel US Air Force, NASA Astronaut, second man to walk on the moon.
  - George Beurling, Canadian RAF fighter ace (a nickname he never acknowledged)

== C ==
- "Caccidiavolo" (Italian, literally "Devil beater") – Aydın Reis, Turkish Admiral and Commander of the Ottoman fleet in Algiers
- "Caddy" – James A. Adkins, World War II U.S. submarine commander
- "Camel" – Hugh Trenchard, British officer responsible for founding the Royal Air Force
- "Candy Bomber" – Gail S. Halvorsen, U.S. Air Force officer
- "Cat's Eyes" – John Cunningham, Second World War British night fighter ace (a nickname he didn't like)
- "Cenaze" – (Turkish, Corpse – Hasan Pasha, Grand Vizier of the Ottomans, Veteran Commander of Russo-Turkish War (1806–1812)
- "Chancre Jack" – Chiang Kai-Shek, political and military leader who served as the leader of the Republic of China
- "Chang Sheng Jiangjun 常胜将军" (Chinese, literally "frequently-winning general") – Zhao Yun, general who lived in the late Eastern Han dynasty and early Three Kingdoms period, for his battle record
- "Chang Shi Wan 常十万" (Chinese, literally "Chang Hundred-Thousand") – Chang Yuchun, general of the early Ming dynasty, for his bravery and prowess
- "CHAOS" – James Mattis, U.S. Marine Corps general and Secretary of Defense
- "Chappie" – Daniel James, Jr., U.S. Air Force general
- "Chargin' Charlie" – Charles A. Beckwith, U.S. Army colonel
- "Chesty" – Lewis B. Puller, U.S. Marine general
- "Chick" – Bernard A. Clarey, World War II U.S. submarine commander
- "Chief"
  - Leon N. Blair, World War II U.S. submarine commander
  - A. R. Corston, World War II RCAF pilot (due to being Cree)
- "Ching" – Willis A. Lee, World War II U.S. admiral
- "Chink" – Eric Dorman-Smith, World War II British general
- "Chips" – Arthur S. Carpender, World War II U.S. submarine force commander
- "Chummy" – James D. Prentice, World War II Canadian destroyer captain
- "Clever Hans" – Hans von Kluge, World War II German general
- "Close-in Conolly" -- Richard Lansing Conolly, World War II U.S. Naval Admiral
- "Cobber" – Edgar J. Kain, World War II RAF fighter ace
- "Le Connétable" (French for The Constable) – Charles de Gaulle, French World War II general and later President of France (see also Cyrano))
- "CQ" – Charles Q. Brown Jr., 22nd Chief of Staff of the U.S. Air Force
- "Crack" – Walter Hanna, U.S. Army general
- "Crow" – Palmer H. Dunbar, Jr., U.S. submarine commander
- "Cump" – William Tecumseh Sherman, U.S. general
- "Curry" – August Thiele, German Kriegsmarine admiral
- "Cy" – Marshall H. Austin, World War II U.S. submarine commander
- "Cyclone" – Emmett S. Davis, World War II U.S. colonel
- "Cyrano" – Charles de Gaulle, French World War II general and later President of France (see also (Le) Connétable)

== D ==
- "Da Guniang 大姑娘" (Chinese, "Big Young Girl") – Lin Biao, a Marshal of the People's Republic of China who was pivotal in the Communist victory in the Chinese Civil War, for his introverted nature
- "Da Shu Jiangjun 大树将军" (Chinese, "The Big Tree General") – Feng Yi, Chinese general of the Eastern Han dynasty, for being humble
- "Dan" – Lawrence R. Daspit, World War II U.S. submarine commander
- "Dang Dai Liu Bowen 当代刘伯温" (Chinese, "Present Day Liu Bowen") – Liu Bocheng, Chinese Communist military commander and Marshal of the People's Liberation Army
- "Debby" – Desmond Piers, Canadian admiral
- "Deke" (or "Deak") – William Parsons, American naval officer (armed Little Boy aboard Enola Gay on first nuclear bombing mission)
- "Deli" (Turkish, Mad) – Halit Karsıalan, Turkish Pasha, member of Grand National Assembly of Turkey
- "Desperate Frankie" – Louis Franchet d'Espèrey, French general during World War I
- "Dennis" – Eugene Wilkinson, U.S. submarine officer
- "The Desert Fox" (German: "Wüstenfuchs") – Erwin Rommel, World War II German field marshal (Afrika Korps)
- "The Devil Commander" – Amedeo Guillet, Italian Cavalry Officer
- "Dick"
  - Richard H. Best – Naval aviator, commanding officer of Bombing Squadron 6 during the Battle of Midway
  - Robert R. Rowland, Tuskegee Airman
  - Richard Winters – Paratrooper and Commanding officer of Easy Company in World War II
- "Dickie" –
  - Michael O'Moore Creagh, British general
  - Louis, Earl Mountbatten, British admiral and statesman
- "Dinghy" – Henry Melvin Young, Second World War RAF bomber pilot
- "Dinty" – John R. Moore, U.S. submarine commander
- "Dixie" – Richard M. Farrell, U.S. submarine commander
- "Diz" – Dean Laird, the only US Navy Fighter Ace in World War II to shoot down German and Japanese aircraft
- "Dizzy" –
  - H. R. Allen, British Air Force fighter ace
  - Gordon B. Rainer, U.S. submarine commander
- "DLB" - Peter de la Billière, British commander of Special Air Service and of British troops during the Gulf War
- "Donc" – Glynn R. Donaho, World War II U.S. submarine commander
- "Dogsbody" – Douglas Bader, Second World War British fighter ace and commander
- "Dolfo" – Adolf Galland, German fighter ace of World War II and General der Jagdflieger
- "Drug Stari" (Serbian: Old Friend) – Josip Broz Tito, Yugoslav general, later president-for-life of Yugoslavia
- "Dugout Doug" – Douglas MacArthur, U.S. general (for living in tunnels during the Japanese invasion of the Philippines)
- "Dunkirk Joe" – William G. Tennant, British naval officer who oversaw the Dunkirk evacuation in 1940
- "Dusty" –
  - Robert Edson Dornin, World War II U.S. submarine commander
  - Norman Jack Kleiss, U.S. Navy Dive Bomber Pilot during World War II
- "Dutch" –
  - Theodore Van Kirk, Navigator of the Enola Gay on the atomic boming mission of Hiroshima
  - John M. Will, U.S. submarine officer

== E ==
- "Eagle" – Pyotr Bagration, Georgian general in the Russian army in the Napoleonic Wars
- "Electric Brain" – Raymond A. Spruance, U.S. admiral
- "Electric Whiskers" – Annibale Bergonzoli, Italian general
- "Elphy Bey" – William G. K. Elphinstone, general, British commander in the First Anglo-Afghan War
- "En Fit Dede" (Turkish, The Fittest Grandfather) – Namık Ekin, Turkish Senior chief petty officer, Underwater Offence commando, Judoka and Guinness record holder
- "Ensign" – Roy S. Benson, World War II U.S. submarine commander
- "Extra Billy" – William Smith, U.S. Congressman, Confederate general

== F ==
- "Fatih" (Turkish, Conqueror) – Fatih Sultan Mehmet II, Turkish Sultan Of The Ottoman Empire, Accomplished Military commander who conquered Constantinople. Also known as the "Avenger Of Troy"
- "Farrar the Para" – Anthony Farrar-Hockley, British general
- "Fearless Freddy" – Frederick B. Warder, U.S. ace submarine commander (a nickname he detested)
- "Fei Jiangjun 飞将军" (Chinese, "The Flying General") – Li Guang, Western Han General, for his bravery against the Xiongnu
- "Fei Xiong 飞熊" (Chinese, "Flying Bear") – Jiang Ziya, Zhou dynasty noble, statesman, and general, because of a dream that King Wen of Zhou had
- "Feng Chu 凤雏" (Chinese, "Fledgling Phoenix") – Pang Tong, adviser to the warlord Liu Bei in the late Eastern Han dynasty, for his erudite demeanor and great potential
- "The Fighting Bishop" – Leonidas Polk, Episcopal bishop and Confederate general
- "Fighting Bob" –
  - Robley Dunglison Evans, US Navy admiral
  - Robert Sale, British general in the First Anglo-Afghan War and First Anglo-Sikh War
- "Fighting Dick" –
  - Richard Talbot, 1st Earl of Tyrconnell, Irish royalist and Jacobite soldier
  - Richard H. Anderson, Confederate general
  - Israel B. Richardson, Union general
- "Fighting Joe" –
  - Joseph Dunford (born 1955), US Marine Corps general, Chairman of the Joint Chiefs of Staff and former commandant of the Marine Corps
  - Joseph Hooker (1814–1879), American Civil War Union Army major general
  - Joseph Wheeler (1836–1906), Confederate Army general and later US Army general and politician
- "The Fighting Quaker" – Smedley Butler, U.S. general
- "Flagellum Dei" (Latin for Scourge of God,) – Attila the Hun, Turkic ruler of the Huns who is renowned for many successful campaigns against Rome
- "The Fool of Owari" – Oda Nobunaga, Japanese daimyō
- "Foul Weather Jack" – Vice-Admiral John Byron RN, British 18th-century admiral
- "Foxy Grandpa" – John P. Lucas, U.S. Army general
- "Freddie" – Frederick Morgan, British Army General, original planner of Operation Overlord
- "Fritz" – Frederick J. Harlfinger II, U.S. submarine commander
- "Frog" – Francis S. Low, U.S. Navy vice admiral
- "Fruity" – Fruity Metcalfe, British WWII officer
- "Fuel Oil" – Franklin O. Johnsonn, U.S. submarine commander
- "Fuzzy" – Robert A. Theobald, U.S. admiral

== G ==
- "Gabby" – Francis Gabreski, U.S. Army Air Force fighter ace
- "Gargoyle" (referring to Onigawara) – Jisaburō Ozawa, Japanese admiral in World War II
- "Garry" – Vermont Garrison, 1 of 7 Fighter Aces in World War II and the Korean War.
- "Gee" – Leonard Gerow, U.S. general
- "Gefreiter" – Adolf Hitler, German leader and chancellor of the German Third Reich, referring to his rank in First World War
- "Gentleman Johnny" – John Burgoyne, British general (Revolutionary War)
- "The G.I. General" – Omar Bradley, U.S. general
- "Grey Wolf" – Gino Polli, Italian army official leader in First World War, hero of the battles of the Piave river, sniper of special forces, in charge of suicide missions
- "Ghost" – Walter I. Lawson, Tuskegee Airman
- "Gin" –
  - Charles W. Styer, U.S. ace submarine commander
  - William Stovall, Jr., U.S. submarine commander
- "Ginger" –
  - W. H. D. Boyle, British admiral
  - James Lacey, British fighter ace
- "Gnu" – Andrew D. Mayer, U.S. Navy officer
- "Goody" – Forrest Guth, American World War II paratrooper
- "Golden General" – Lt Gen. Saad Elshazly, Egyptian Chief of Staff
- "Gopher" – Everett Blakely, USAAF pilot in the 100th Bombardment Group.
- "Granny" –
  - Robert E. Lee, Confederate general
  - Elwell Stephen Otis, U.S. general
- "Gravedigger" – Henry Havelock, British general in The Indian Mutiny
- "Gray Eagle" – Richard C. Mangrum, US Marine Corps Lieutenant General and the first Marine to hold the Gray Eagle Award
- "Grey Fox" – George Crook, U.S. Army general, American Civil War
- "Gray Ghost" – John S. Mosby, Confederate Army cavalry commander, American Civil War
- "Grumble" – William E. Jones, Confederate general, American Civil War
- "Gu Bai Shun 顾百顺" (Chinese, literally "Gu the hundred-obedient") – Gu Zhutong, military general and administrator of the Republic of China, for his willingness to do Chiang Kai-Shek's bidding without question
- "Gu Zhi Elai 古之恶来" (Chinese, "Like the ancient Elai"; Elai was a bodyguard for King Zhou of Shang) – Dian Wei, general and bodyguard of the Eastern Han dynasty serving under the warlord Cao Cao, for his physical strength
- "Gu Zhi Zhaohu 古之昭虎" (Chinese, "Like the ancient Zhaohu"; Zhaohu itself is a nickname for Duke Zhaomu of Zhou, who defeated 40,000 Dongyi of the Jianghuai with his 7,000 strong army) – Zhang Liao, general of the Eastern Han dynasty and Cao Wei serving under the warlord Cao Cao, for his victory at the Battle of Xiaoyao Ford
- "Gulle" – Walter Oesau, World War II German fighter ace
- "Gus" – Harold L. Edwards, First World War Canadian air gunner
- "Guts and Gaiters" – Arthur Currie, First World War Canadian general

== H ==
- "Hack" – David Hackworth, US Army Colonel, Veteran of World War II, Korean War, and Vietnam War
- "Hal" – Harold Moore, US Army Lieutenant General, Veteran of World War II, Korean War, and Vietnam War
- "Ham" – Wesley A. Wright, U.S. intelligence officer
- The "Hammer" –
  - Judah the Hammer, Jewish Rebel commander in the Maccabean Revolt.
  - Charles Martel, Frankish commander at the Battle of Tours.
  - Gianni Polli, Italian general commander at the World War I and at the World War II Bersaglieri.
- "Hammerhead" – John C. Martin, U.S. submarine commander
- "Hap" –
  - Henry H. Arnold, USAAF/USAF General of the Air Force.
  - Hobart R. Gay, U.S. Army officer, Patton's Chief of Staff
  - Hyland B. Lyon, U.S. submarine commander
- "le Hardi" (French, the bold) – William Douglas, Scottish freedom fighter
- "Hard-Over-Harry" – Harry DeWolf, Canadian admiral
- "Harry Hotspur" – Sir Henry Percy, English soldier and rebel
- "Hawkeye" – Giora Epstein, Israeli Air Force Fighter Pilot
- "He Huzi 贺胡子" (Chinese, "Bearded He") – He Long, general of the Chinese Red Army
- "He Popo 何婆婆" (Chinese, "Granny He") – He Yingqin, senior general of the Kuomintang during Republican China, and a close ally of Chiang Kai-shek, to describe him being second-in-command to Chiang
- "Hell Roaring Jake" – Jacob H. Smith, U.S. general
- "Hell Roaring Mike" – Michael Healy, U.S. Revenue Cutter Service captain
- "Gelibolu Kahramanı" (Turkish, Hero of Gallipoli– Wehib Pasha, Turkish General(Pasha)
- "Hero of the Nile" – Horatio, Viscount Nelson, British admiral
- "He-who-sees-in-the-dark" – Frederick Russell Burnham, U.S. scout; British major, Chief of Scouts; father of international Scouting movement.
- "Hobo" – Percy Hobart, British general and tank warfare proponent
- "Honest John" – John Leitweiler, U.S. intelligence officer
- "Hongjun Zhi Fu 红军之父" (Chinese, "Father of the Red Army") – Zhu De, Chinese general, warlord, politician, revolutionary and one of the pioneers of the Chinese Communist Party.
- "Horny" – Roza Shanina, Soviet sniper
- "Howling Jake" – Jacob H. Smith, U.S. general
- "Howling Mad" – Holland M. Smith, U.S. Marine Corps general
- "Hub" – Hubert Zemke, USAAF Fighter Ace and Commanding Officer of the 56th Fighter Group in WWII
- "Hu Bao Yi 呼保義" (Chinese, "Protector of Justice") – Song Jiang, leader of a group of Chinese outlaws who lived in the Song dynasty, nickname made famous by the novel Water Margin
- "Hu Chi 虎癡" (Chinese, "Tiger Fool") – Xu Chu, Cao Wei general who lived in the late Eastern Han dynasty and the Three Kingdoms period, for being strong yet simple-minded
- "Huang Xu'er 黄须儿" (Chinese, literally "Yellow beard lad") – Cao Zhang, Prince and General of Cao Wei, third son of Cao Cao
- "Hüdavendigâr" (Turkish, Devotee of god) – Murat I, Ottoman Turkish Sultan known for his conquests in the Rumelia (Balkans)
- "Hunter-Bunter" – Aylmer Hunter-Weston, British general
- "Hutch" – Damon W. Cooper, US Navy vice admiral, Aviator, and first Chief of Naval Reserve

== I ==
- "Ike" –
  - Dwight D. Eisenhower, U.S. general and later President of the United States
  - Arnold H. Holz, U.S. submarine commander
  - William R. Wilson, U.S. submarine officer
- "Irish" – Edward R. Hannon, U.S. submarine commander
- "Iron Ass" –
  - Curtis E. LeMay, US Army Air Force/US Air Force General, Commander Strategic Air Command, USAF Chief of Staff. Often bowdlerized to "Iron Pants" or "Iron Tail"
  - Simón Bolívar (in Spanish, "culo de hierro"), Venezuelan/Colombian general. So named by the llanero cavalry of José Antonio Páez for Bolívar's ability to endure long rides on horseback.
- "Ishkhan" – Nikoghayos Poghos Mikaelian, Armenian freedom fighter
- "The Iron General " – Gianni Polli, Italian General Commander of Bersaglieri of WWI and WWII.
- "Le Maréchal de fer"(The Iron Marshal) – Louis-Nicolas Davout, French military commander with talent for war, along with his reputation as a stern disciplinarian.

== J ==
- "Jack" – Leif J. Sverdrup, U.S. general
- "Jackie" – J. A. Fisher, British admiral
- "Jadex" – Jacques Dextraze, Canadian general
- "Jake" – John K. Fyfe, U.S. ace submarine commander
- "Jasper" – Wilfred J. Holmes, U.S. Navy intelligence officer
- "Jeb" – J. E. B. Stuart, Confederate general
- "Jiangdong Meng Hu 江东猛虎" (Chinese, "Fierce Tiger of Jiangdong") – Sun Jian, general and warlord who lived in the late Eastern Han dynasty, for his ferocity in battle
- "Jig Dog" – James D. Ramage, US Navy Admiral, dive bomber pilot in World War II
- "Jiggs" – Roy Geiger, US Marine Corps General
- "Jimmy" – John S. Thach, U.S. Navy fighter ace
- "Jin Fan Zei 锦帆贼" (Chinese, "Bandit with the Brocade Sails") – Gan Ning, general serving under the warlord Sun Quan in the late Eastern Han dynasty, for his past as a pirate and his easy-going personality
- "Jin Ma Chao 锦马超" (Chinese, literally "Brocade Ma Chao") – Ma Chao, general and warlord who lived in the late Eastern Han dynasty and early Three Kingdoms period, for his good looks and athleticism
- "Jock" –
  - J. C. Campbell, British Army general
  - J. C. K. Slater, British admiral
- "Jocko" – Joseph J. Clark, US Navy Admiral
- "Joe" –
  - Brigadier John Ormsby Evelyn Vandeleur (from his initials), World War II British Army officer
  - Elton W. Grenfell, U.S. ace submarine commander
- "Johnnie" – James E. Johnson, British Royal Air Force fighter ace
- "Johnny" –
  - W. E. P. Johnson, British Royal Air Force flight instructor
  - Frederick J. Walker, World War II British ASW destroyer task force commander
- "Jorrocks" – Brian Horrocks, World War II British corps commander
- "Judge" – Ernest M. Eller, U.S. Navy admiral
- "Jugs" – Andrew D. Turner, Tuskegee Airman
- "Jumbo" – H. M. Wilson, World War II British Army general.
- "Jumpin' Jim" – James M. Gavin, U.S. paratroop general
- "The Jumping General" – James M. Gavin, U.S. paratroop general
- "Junior" – John S. McCain, Jr., World War II U.S. submarine commander (a nickname he disliked)

== K ==
- "Kahraman-ı Hürriyet" (Turkish, Hero of Liberty) – İsmail Enver Pasha, Turkish-Ottoman General(Pasha), High-ranking member of the Committee of Union and Progress, one of the Three Pashas, Revolutionary and later Leader of the Basmachi revolt
- "Kasap" (Turkish for "Butcher") – Cemâl Pasha, Turkish-Ottoman General(Pasha), Minister of Navy and one of the Three Pashas.
- "Kalfie" – Henry J. Martin, South African Air Force officer
- "Kemal" (Turkish for The Perfect/Mature One) – Mustafa "Kemal "Atatürk, Turkish-Ottoman field marshal, revolutionary statesman, author, and the founding father of the Republic of Turkey Mustafa received the nickname of "Kemal", from his mathematics teacher
- "Killer"
  - Clive Caldwell, Australian fighter ace of World War II (a name he detested)
  - William R. Kane, US Navy Fighter Ace or World War II
  - Liu Zhennian, Chinese officer and warlord
- "Kindly Old Gentleman" or "KOG" – Hyman Rickover, father of the United States nuclear navy
- "King Bee" – Ben Moreell, pioneer of the US Navy SeaBees
- "King Billy" – King William III of England
- "King Kong" – Hara Chuichi, Japanese Navy admiral
- "King of Scouts" – Frederick Russell Burnham, British major, Chief of Scouts & father of international Scouting movement.
- "Kipper" – Kodandera Madappa Cariappa, Indian Army field marshal
- "Kirky" – Alan G. Kirk, US Navy Admiral in World War II
- "Kit" – Leonard Carson, Triple Ace with the 357th Fighter Group in World War II (named after Kit Carson)
- "Kluger Hans" ("Clever Hans") – Günther von Kluge, German World War II field marshal
- "Kut'ül Ammare Kahramanı" (Turkish, Hero of Kut Al Amara) – Halil Kut, Turkish Pasha, Commander of the forces in Kut Al Amara and uncle of Enver Pasha

== L ==
- "Lakeitel (German, "lackey") – Wilhelm Keitel, German World War II general staff officer
- "Lao Hu Zai 老虎仔" (Chinese, "Tiger Lad") – Xue Yue, Chinese Nationalist military general, also nicknamed by Claire Lee Chennault of the Flying Tigers as the "Patton of Asia"
- "Lao Tou Zi 老头子" (Chinese, roughly "Old Man") – Chiang Kai-Shek, political and military leader who served as the leader of the Republic of China, nickname carries a slight connotation of being a gang leader
- "Lao Wang 老王" (Chinese, "Old Wang") – Wang Yaowu, high-ranking KMT general and the governor of Shandong Province who successfully fought against both the Imperial Japanese Army and the Chinese Communists, for his ferocity and bravery in the fight against the Japanese
- "Lighthorse Harry" – Henry Lee III, U.S. general
- "Lightning Joe" – J. Lawton Collins, American general
- "The Lion" –
  - Karl Dönitz, German admiral
  - Abu Jandal al-Kuwaiti, high-ranking Islamic State of Iraq and the Levant commander
- "The Lionheart" – King Richard I of England, Christian commander in the Third Crusade
- "The Lion of Fallujah" – Douglas A. Zembiec, US Marine Corps Officer
- "The Lion of Panjshir" – Ahmad Shah Massoud, Afghan guerilla leader
- "The Lion of Brzeziny" – Karl Litzmann, German general in World War I
- "The Lion of Verdun" – Philippe Petain, French World War I general, later head of the Vichy regime
- "Lion of the West" – Koos de la Rey, Boer general
- "Lion of West Transvaal" – Koos de la Rey, Boer general
- "Lip" – Carwood Lipton, American World War II paratrooper officer
- "Little Billy" –
  - William Mahone, Confederate general
  - James, Earl Cardigan, British general
- "Little Powell" – A. P. Hill, Confederate general
- "The Little Corporal" – Napoleon Bonaparte, 19th-century French field marshal and emperor
- "Little Texas" – Audie Murphy, World War II Medal of Honor recipient, used only by his close friends
- "Little Mac" – George B. McClellan, commander of the Union Army
- "Liu Da Dao 劉大刀" (Chinese, literally "Big Blade Liu") – Liu Ting, late Ming dynasty general, for the ability to wield his 120 catty blade like any other
- "The Long Fellow" Éamon de Valera, Irish rebel leader and later statesman (due to his height)
- "Lo" – Lewis Armisted, Confederate Army General in the American Civil War
- "Looney" – Robert Hinde, British World War II armoured officer
- "Lucky" –
  - Clarence D. Lester, Tuskegee Airman
  - Eugene B. Fluckey, U.S. World War II submarine commander and Medal of Honor recipient
  - Miles Dempsey, British Second World War general

== M ==
- "Mad Anthony" – Anthony Wayne, U.S. general
- "Mad Dog" – James Mattis, US Marine Corps general and Secretary of Defense
- "Mad Jack" – Jack Churchill, British colonel in World War II
- "Mad Mike" –
  - Mike Calvert, British Second World War leader of Special Forces formations
  - Mike Hoare, British officer and mercenary leader
- "Magoo" – Tod D. Wolters, US Air Force General and NATO Supreme Allied Commander Europe
- "Majoren" (Norwegian, "The Major") – Hans Reidar Holtermann, Norwegian World War II military leader
- "Mang Xiahou 盲夏侯" (Chinese, "Blind Xiahou") – Xiahou Dun, general serving under the warlord Cao Cao in the late Eastern Han dynasty, for the loss of his left eye
- "Mang Zhang Fei 莽张飞" (Chinese, "Rash Zhang Fei") – Zhang Fei, general who served under the warlord Liu Bei in the late Eastern Han dynasty and early Three Kingdoms period, for his famously hot temper
- "Manila John" – John Basilone, U.S. marine, World War II Medal of Honor recipient
- "The Marble Man" – Robert E. Lee, Confederate general (for his perfection at West Point)
- "The Marble Model" – Robert E. Lee, Confederate general (for his perfection at West Point)
- "Marshal Forwards" – Gebhard Leberecht von Blücher, Prussian general
- "Mary" – Arthur Coningham, New Zealand/Australian First World War flying ace and Second World War senior RAF officer
- "Maryland Stuart" – George H. Stewart, Confederate general
- "Mezzomorto" (Italian, literally "Half-dead") – Hajji Husain Pasha, Spaniard Convert Pirate, Dey of Algiers and Ottoman Grand Admiral (Kapudan Pasha)
- "Meagher of the Sword" – Thomas Francis Meagher, commander of the Union Irish Brigade during the American Civil War
- "Mei Ran Gong 美髯公" (Chinese, "Lord of the Magnificent Beard")- Guan Yu, general serving under the warlord Liu Bei in the late Eastern Han dynasty, nickname given by Emperor Xian of Han
- "Mick" – Edward Mannock, First World War British fighter ace
- "Mickey" – David Marcus, American Army colonel, helped train the nascent Israeli Army, became its first general (Aluf)
- "Mike" – Frank W. Fenno, Jr., U.S. submarine commander
- "Micky" – Harold Brownlow Martin, Second World War Australian bomber pilot attached to the RAF
- "Ming the Merciless" – Leslie Morshead, Second World War Australian general, also in First World War
- "Mokka" – Mordechai Limon, Israeli admiral
- "Moke" – William J. Millican, U.S. submarine commander
- "Monk" – Benjamin Dickson, U.S. intelligence officer
- "The Monster" – Jacob H. Smith, U.S. general
- "Monty" – Bernard Montgomery, Second World War British field marshal
- "Moon" – Wreford G. Chapple, World War II U.S. ace submarine commander
- "Mr. Death" – John L. Whitehead Jr., Tuskegee Airman, First African American to fly a B-47
- "Mr. X" – Felix Gygax, US Navy Admiral in WWII
- "Mush" (from "Mushmouth") – Dudley W. Morton, World War II U.S. ace submarine commander (for his Tennessee drawl)
- "Mustapha" – Husband E. Kimmel, CINCPAC at Pearl Harbor 7 December 1941
- "Murph" – Michael P. Murphy, Navy SEAL

== N ==
- "Ned" – Edward L. Beach, Jr., World War II U.S. submarine commander and writer
- "Nick" – George D. Wallace, U.S. cavalry officer
- "Nuts" – Anthony McAuliffe, acting commander if the 101st Airborne Division during the Battle of the Bulge.

== O ==
- "Oklahoma Pete" – Marc Mitscher, American World War II admiral
- "Ol' Blood and Guts" – George S. Patton, World War II U.S. general (a nickname he rejected)
- "Ol' Fuss and Feathers" – Winfield Scott, U.S. Army general
- "Ol' Rough and Ready" – Zachary Taylor, U.S. Army general, 12th President of the United States
- "Old Brains" – Henry Halleck, Union general
- "Old Dutch" – Edward C. Kalbfus, American admiral
- "Old Flintlock" – Roger Hanson, Confederate general
- "Old Forwards" – Gebhard Leberecht von Blücher, Prussian general at the Battle of Waterloo
- "Old Gimlet Eye" – Smedley Butler, U.S. General
- "Old Gravel Voice" – Ernest N. Harmon, U.S. Army General
- "Old Hickory" – Andrew Jackson, U.S. Army General, 7th President of the United States
- "Old Iron Heels" – Jerauld Wright, US Navy Admiral, (one of two nicknames he earned)
- "Old Iron Tits" – Matthew Ridgway, U.S. Army General, he earned this nickname by wearing hand grenades on his chest during combat jumps.
- "Old Jube/Jubilee" – Jubal Early, Confederate general
- "Old Mac" – James McCudden, British First World War fighter ace
- "The Old Man of the Morea" – Theodoros Kolokotronis, military leader of the Greek War of Independence
- "Old Pap" – Sterling Price, Confederate general
- "Old Reliable" –
  - William J. Hardee, Confederate general
  - George H. Thomas, Union general
- "Old Rock" – Henry L. Benning, Confederate general
- "Old Snapping Turtle" – George Gordon Meade, Union Army Commanding General at the Battle of Gettysburg in the American Civil War
- "Old Sam Jacinto" – Sam Houston, Army General for the United States and the Republic of Texas
- "Old Stars" – Ormsby M. Mitchel, Union general
- "Old Stoneface" – Jerauld Wright, US Navy Admiral, (one of two nicknames he earned)
- "Old Tippecanoe" – William Henry Harrison, U.S. Army General, 9th President of the United States
- "Old Wooden Head" – John Bell Hood, Confederate general
- "Onkel" – Theo Osterkamp, German fighter ace of both world wars
- "Otter" – Orde Wingate, British commander of irregular forces in the Second World War
- "Ozzie" – Richard B. Lynch, U.S. submarine officer

== P ==
- "Pa" – Edwin M. Watson, American general
- "Pablo" – Squadron Leader Paul Mason, RAF pilot during Operation Desert Storm and author
- "Pacifier of Libya" (Italian: Pacificatore della Libia) – Rodolfo Graziani, Italian Army general
- "Paddy" –
  - Brendan Finucane, World War II Irish RAF fighter ace
  - Hugh Gough, 19th century British Army general
  - Robert Blair Mayne, British officer – founding member of SAS
  - W. H. Harbison, British RAF officer
  - Paedo Trev, Royal Navy Petty Officer
- "Pancho" – Francisco Villa, Mexican Army General during the Mexican Revolution
- "The Panther Man" (Italian, L'uomo pantera) – Achille Starace, Italian Army major general, Blackshirt, and Fascist party leader
- "Papa" – Joseph Joffre, World War I French marechal
- "Pappy" –
  - Greg Boyington, World War II U.S. Marine Corps fighter ace
  - Paul Gunn, World War II U.S. Army Air Force bomber pilot
- "Pappa Dönitz" – Karl Dönitz, German admiral
- "Pat" –
  - Patrick N. L. Bellinger, US Navy Admiral and Naval Aviation Pioneer
  - J. Loy Maloney, U.S. submarine commander
- "Patton of Asia – Xue Yue, Chinese Nationalist military general, nicknamed by Claire Lee Chennault of the Flying Tigers
- "Peaches" – David Petraeus, United States Army general
- "Peng Da Jiangjun 彭大将军"(Chinese, "Great General Peng") – Peng Dehuai, prominent Chinese Communist military leader, and served as China's Defense Minister from 1954 to 1959.
- "Pete" –
  - Lloyd M. Bucher, U.S. submarine commander
  - William E. Ferrall, U.S. submarine commander
  - Ignatius J. Galantin, U.S. submarine commander
  - James Longstreet, Confederate general
  - Marc Mitscher, World War II U.S. admiral
- "Petit Rouge" (French: Little Red) – Manfred von Richthofen, German fighter ace
- "Pi" – Herman A. Piczentkowski, U.S. submarine commander
- "Pied Piper of Saipan" – Guy Gabaldon, U.S. marine
- "Piggy" – Brian Boyle (SAAF officer)
- "Pilly" – Willis A. Lent, U.S. submarine commander
- "Ping" – Theodore S. Wilkinson, U.S. Navy admiral and commander of ONI
- "Pinky" – Marvin G. Kennedy, U.S. Navy submarine and destroyer commander
- "Pip" – G. P. B. Roberts, British general
- "Pips" – Josef Priller, World War II German fighter ace
- "Popo 婆婆" (Chinese, "Granny") – Luo Ronghuan, Chinese communist military leader, for his ability to work with Lin Biao despite the latter's personality, and his talent in managing logistics and other background work for him
- "Po Tui Jiangjun 跛腿將軍" (Chinese, "lame legged general") – Zhang Lingfu, high-ranking general of the Chinese National Revolutionary Army, injured during the Battle of Nanchang
- "Poco" – William W. Smith, U.S. Navy officer (Kimmel's Chief of Staff)
- "Poet General" – Masaharu Homma, Imperial Japanese Army general known for his invasion of the Philippines
- "Pompey" – Harold Elliott, First World War Australian general
- "Popski" – Vladimir Peniakoff, Belgian-born commando in British service in the Second World War
- "Prince John" – John B. Magruder, Confederate general
- "Pritzl" – Heinz Bär, German fighter ace

== Q ==
- "Quax" – Karl Schnörrer, German fighter ace of World War II
- "Quex" – H. F. P. Sinclair, British admiral and head of SIS

== R ==
- "Raful" – Rafael Eitan, Israeli Chief of Staff and politician
- "Ratsy" – George Preddy, fighter ace with the 352nd Fighter Group in WWII
- "Razin" – Dan Caine, US Air Force General, Chairman of the Joint Chiefs of Staff
- "Rebel" – Vernon L. Lowrance, U.S. ace submarine commander
- "Red" –
  - James W. Coe, World War II U.S. ace submarine commander
  - Walter E. Doyle, U.S. submarine commander
  - Ralph C. Lynch, Jr., U.S. submarine commander
  - William F. Raborn, U.S. admiral and director of the CIA
  - Lawson P. Ramage, U.S. ace submarine commander
  - Douglas N. Syverson, U.S. submarine officer
- "The Red Baron" (German: der Rote Baron) – Manfred von Richthofen, German fighter ace
- "The Red Battle-flyer" (German: der rote Kampfflieger) – Manfred von Richthofen, German fighter ace
- "The Red Knight" – Manfred von Richthofen, German fighter ace
- "Red Mike" – Merritt A. Edson, World War II U.S. Marine Raiders officer
- "Reeste" – Heinz Bär, German fighter ace
- "Reggie" – Harry George Smart, British air vice marshal
- "Ren Tu 人屠" (Chinese, literally "Human Butcher") – Bai Qi, general of the Qin state in the Warring States period of China, for being responsible for the deaths of a total of between 890,000 and 2,000,000 enemy soldiers
- "Rey" – Ernest J. King, US Navy Fleet Admiral in World War II ('Rey' is 'King' in Spanish)
- "Rock of Chickamauga" – George Henry Thomas, Union Army general, US Civil War
- "Rooney" – William Henry Fitzhugh Lee, Confederate general and U.S. Congressman
- "Rosey" – Redfield Mason, U.S. cryptanalyst
- "Rosie" – Robert Rosenthal, B-17 pilot with the 100th Bomb Group in the U.S. Army Air Forces
- "Rough and Ready" – Zachary Taylor, U.S. Army general
- "Rum" – John M. Jones, Confederate general

== S ==
- "The Saint" – Augustus R. St. Angelo, U.S. submarine officer
- "Sailor" – Adolph G. Malan, South African fighter ace in the RAF in the Second World War
- "Sailor King" – King William IV of Great Britain (due to service in the Royal Navy)
- "Sally" – James J. Archer, Confederate general
- "Sam Bahadur" – Sam Manekshaw, former Indian Army field marshal
- "San Xing Jia Nu 三姓家奴" (Chinese, "Slave of Three Surnames") – Lü Bu, general and warlord of the late Eastern Han dynasty, for his betrayal of former masters Ding Yuan and Dong Zhuo
- "Sandy" –
  - Louis D. McGregor, U.S. submarine commander
  - Alexander Patch, US Army General in WWII
- "Savvy" –
  - Charles M. Cooke, Jr., World War II U.S. sailor
  - Leon J. Huffman, U.S. submarine commander
  - Charles W. Read, U.S. Federal and Confederate naval officer
- "Schneller Heinz" (German, "Hurrying Heinz") – Heinz Guderian, World War II German panzer general
- "der Schweiger" (German, "The silent one") – Helmuth von Moltke the Elder, long-serving 19th-century chief of the Prussian and later the German General Staff
- "Screwball" – George Beurling, World War II Canadian fighter ace
- "Sea Wolf" – John D. Bulkeley, US Navy Admiral and Surface Warfare Officer awarded the Medal of Honor
- "Seri Paşa" (Turkish, "Rapid General or Pasha") – Hulusi Akar, Turkish Chief of General Staff
- "Seminole" – Edmund Kirby Smith, Confederate general
- "Shadow" – Lynn Garrison, RCAF fighter pilot and mercenary
- "Shanks" – Nathan G. Evans, Confederate general
- "Sharkey" – Nigel Ward, Royal Navy fighter pilot during the Falklands War and author.
- "Shen Tong Dajiang 神通大将" (Chinese, roughly "Great General of Clever Ability") – Li Siye, general of the Tang dynasty, for his prowess in the campaign against Chach
- "Shen Xu 申胥" (Chinese, "Xu of Shen") – Wu Zixu, general and politician of the Wu kingdom in the Spring and Autumn period
- "Shimi" – Simon Fraser, Second World War British commando leader
- "Shorty" –
  - Charles D. Edmunds, U.S. submarine commander
  - Robert H. Soule, U.S. 3rd Infantry Division commander
- "Shot Pouch" – William H.T. Walker, Confederate general
- "Colonel Shrapnel" – Alan Brooke, British World War II general & CIGS
- "Shy" – Edward C. Meyer, former United States Army Chief of Staff
- "Silent Jack" – John Jellicoe, Royal Navy Admiral in WWI.
- "Silent Otto" – Otto Kretschmer, World War II German ace submarine commander
- "Skinny" – Francis W. Rockwell, U.S. Navy admiral
- "Skipper" – George L. Knox II, Tuskegee Airman
- "Sky Samurai" – Saburō Sakai, World War II Japanese Navy fighter ace
- "Sledgehammer" – Eugene Sledge, US Marine Corps Corporal in WWII.
- "Slew" – John S. McCain, Sr., World War II U.S. admiral and aviator
- "Smiling Albert" – Albert Kesselring, World War II Luftwaffe field marshal
- "Smitty" – John S. McCain, Jr., Vietnam War U.S. admiral
- "Snort" – Dale Snodgrass, US Navy Captain and Naval Aviator
- "Soarer" – David G. M. Campbell (after winning the 1896 Grand National on a horse called "Soarer")
- "Soupy" – James H. Campbell, World War II U.S. submarine commander
- "Sparky" – Ronald Speirs, Governor of Spandau Prison
- "Speed" – John P. Currie, World War II U.S. submarine commander
- "Speedy" – Arthur H. Graubart, US Naval Intelligence Officer in World War II.
- "Spider" – James Marks, former commander of the United States Army Intelligence Center
- "Spig" – Frank W. Wead, U.S. Navy aviator and screenwriter
- "Spike" –
  - William H. P. Blandy, U.S. Navy admiral
  - William Eckert, U.S. Air Force lieutenant general and fourth commissioner of Major League Baseball
  - Martin P. Hottel, U.S. submarine commander
  - William W. Momyer, U.S. Air Force general and World War II flying ace
- "Splash" – Edward Ashmore, British general who served in the Royal Flying Corps and RAF during World War I before rejoining the army to lead air defence
- "Spoons" – Benjamin F. Butler, Union general
- "Spud" – Elbert C. Lindon, U.S. submarine commander
- "Spuds" -Theodore G. Ellyson, U.S. Naval Aviator
- "Stan" – Roderic Dallas, World War I Australian fighter ace
- "Steam" – Elliott E. Marshall, U.S. submarine commander
- "Stew" – Everett W. Stewart, Commanding officer of the 4th Fighter Group in World War II.
- "Star of Africa" – Hans-Joachim Marseille, German flying ace
- "Stonewall" – Thomas J. Jackson, Confederate general
- "Stoney" – Clifford H. Roper, U.S. submarine commander
- "Stormin' Norman" – Norman Schwarzkopf, Jr., U.S. general (a nickname he disliked)
- "Strafer" – W. H. E. Gott, British general (from a German propaganda poster, Gott strafe England)
- "Stuffy" – Hugh C. T. Dowding, commander of Fighter Command during the Battle of Britain
- "Sunshine" – Stuart S. Murray, U.S. submarine commander
- "Swanky Syd" – S. T. B. Lawford, British general (from his penchant for appearing full dress uniform and in the company of beautiful women)
- "The Swamp Fox" – Francis Marion, U.S. general
- "The Swamp Fox of the Confederacy" – M. Jeff Thompson, Confederate general
- "Swede" –
  - Eliot H. Bryant, World War II U.S. submarine commander
  - Charles B. Momsen, World War II U.S. submarine force commander, inventor of the Momsen lung
  - Stanley Vejtasa, US Navy Fighter Ace of World War II
- "The Swedish knight" – Sir Sidney Smith, British naval officer in the Napoleonic Wars who was knighted by the Swedish Crown
- "Sword of God" – [Khalid ibn al-Walid | خالد بن الوليد], Military Commander Rashidun Army
- "Systematic Joe" – Sir Stanley Maude, British general in Mesopotamia during World War I (for his carefully planned campaign advancing up the Tigris river)

== T ==
- "Taffy"
  - James I. T. Jones, British World War One fighter ace
  - Trafford Leigh-Mallory, British Second World War Royal Air Force officer
- "Taigong Wang 太公望" (Chinese, roughly "Hopeful Grand Duke") – Jiang Ziya, Zhou dynasty noble, statesman, and general, for being the 'master' King Wen of Zhou had hoped for
- "Tenacious" – Tanaka Raizo World War II Japanese destroyer admiral (for action in the Solomon Islands)
- "Terrible Terry" – Terry de la Mesa Allen Sr., US Army General in World War II
- "Terrible Tommy" – Thomas E. Watson, USMC General in World War II
- "Terrible Turner" – R. Kelly Turner, Admiral USN in World War II
- "The Great Asparagus" – Charles de Gaulle, French general and later President of France
- "The Terror" – Edward Quinan, Indian Army General in World War II
- "The Terror of Morocco" – Aarne Juutilainen, Finnish army captain, who also served in the French Foreign Legion
- "The Terror of Tobermory" – Gilbert Stephenson, Royal Navy anti-submarine tactician in World War I and Naval training commandant in World War II.
- "Tiryâkî" (Turkish, Addict or Fanatic) -Tiryaki Hasan Pasha, XVII Century Ottoman Military Commander, Pasha and Beylerbeyi
- "The Tiger" – Suheil al-Hassan, Syrian Arab Army brigadier general
- "The Young Napoleon" – George B. McClellan, Union general
- "Tex" –
  - Forrest R. Biard, World War II U.S. submarine commander
  - David Hill, Flying Tigers fighter ace
  - Heber H. McLean, U.S. submarine commander
  - Leonard S. Mewhinney, U.S. submarine commander
  - Chris Kyle, U.S. Navy SEAL
- "Thunderbolt" –
  - Bayezid I, Ottoman sultan
  - Georgios Kondylis, Greek Army general and politician
- "Tiger of Malaya" – Yamashita Tomoyuki, World War II Japanese general
- "Tim" Pile – Frederick Pile, World War II British general
- "Tin Legs" – Sir Douglas Bader – Second World War RAF ace
- "Tiny" –
  - Edmund Ironside, British field marshal and Chief of the Imperial General Staff
  - Bernard Freyberg, British World War I officer and commander of NZEF in World War II
  - Frank C. Lynch, Jr., U.S. submarine commander
- "Tooey" – Carl A. Spaatz, American general, first Chief of Staff of the United States Air Force
- "Topal" (Turkish, Lame) – Feridunzade Osman, Turkish Militia Lieutenant Colonel, gained this nickname when a Bulgarian cannonball wounded his right kneecap during the war making him lame.
- "Tubby" – Arthur Allen, Second World War Australian general
- "Turkey Neck" – George C. Crawford, World War II U.S. submarine commander
- "Turkish Garibaldi" – Ahmet Niyazi Bey, Ottoman Adjutant Major(Kolağası), revolutionary member of the Young Turks and Bey of Resne
- "Twig" – Irving L. Branch, US Air Force General

== U ==
- "Uncle Bill" – William Slim, British Second World War general in Burma
- "Uncle Billy" – William T. Sherman, U.S. Civil War general
- "Uncle Charlie" – Charles A. Lockwood, Jr., World War II U.S. Pacific Fleet Submarine Force commander
- "Uncle Dan" – Daniel E. Barbey, World War II U.S. Navy Admiral
- "Uncle John" – John Sedgwick, U.S. Civil War general
- "Uncle Wiggly Wings" – Gail S. Halvorsen, U.S. Air Force officer

== V ==
- "Vati (German for "Pappy" or "Daddy") – Werner Mölders, German fighter ace
- "Viking of Assault" – John L. Hall Jr., US Navy Admiral in World War II
- "Vinegar Joe" – Joseph Stilwell, U.S. general
- "Valkoinen Kuolema" (Finnish for "white death") – Simo Häyhä, Finnish sniper in Winter War

== W ==
- "War Horse" – James Longstreet, Confederate general
- "Warrior Monk" – James Mattis, retired US Marine Corps general and US Secretary of Defense
- "Weary"
  - Edward Dunlop, Australian surgeon renowned for his leadership role while imprisoned by the Japanese during the Second World War
  - Charles W. Wilkins, U.S. submarine commander
- "Weegee" – William G. Brown, World War II U.S. submarine commander
- "Wen Hou 温候" (Chinese, "Marquis of Wen") – Lü Bu, general and warlord of the late Eastern Han dynasty, a title granted by Dong Zhuo which became a household name
- "Westy" – William Westmoreland, commander of U.S. forces during the Vietnam War
- "Whiskey" – Andrew Jackson Smith, Union Army general
- "White Death" – Simo Häyhä, Finnish Sniper during the Winter War
- "The White Death of the Saracens" – Nikephoros II Phokas Byzantine general and emperor
- "The White Mouse"- Nancy Wake, for her ability to elude capture
- "The White Tornado" – Adrian Cummins, Royal Australian Navy commodore, for his 'whirling' manner
- "Wild Bill" –
  - William A. Campbell, Tuskegee Airman
  - William J. Donovan, Medal of Honor recipient, Army major general and first director of the Office of Strategic Services
  - William Guarnere, American World War II paratrooper
  - William T. Halton, USAAF Fighter Ace of the 352nd Fighter Group
- "Willie" – J. B. Tait, British bomber pilot in the Second World War
- "Wingy" – James M. L. Renton, British general (for having lost an arm in battle)
- "Winkle" – Eric Brown, British Second World War test pilot
- "Wizard of the Saddle" – Nathan Bedford Forrest, Confederate cavalry general
- "Wolong 卧龙" (Chinese, "Crouching Dragon") – Zhuge Liang, politician, military strategist, writer, engineer and inventor during the late Eastern Han dynasty, and Imperial Chancellor and regent of Shu Han during the Three Kingdoms period, for his ambition and great potential
- "Wooch" – Kendall J. Fielder, U.S. Army intelligence officer
- "Wooden Box" – Richard Geoffrey Pine-Coffin, British Army parachute officer during the Second World War
- "Wop" – W. R. May, Canadian aviator in the First World War
- "Wu Tzu 吴子" (Chinese, 'Tzu' is used in respect) – Wu Qi, military leader, general, Legalist philosopher, and politician in the Warring States period
- "Wully" – Sir William Robertson, 1st Baronet – chief of the Imperial General Staff during the First World War, never lost traces of a working-class accent
- "Wutz" – Wilhelm-Ferdinand Galland, World War II Luftwaffe fighter pilot and brother of Adolf Galland

== X ==
- "Xi Chu Ba Wang 西楚霸王" (Chinese, "Hegemon-King of Western Chu") – Xiang Yu, Late Qin dynasty Warlord, King of Western Chu during the Chu–Han Contention, for his immense bravery and ferocity
- "Xiang Shuai 香帅" (Chinese, "Fragrant Marshall") – Zhang Zhidong, important Chinese official of the late Qing dynasty, because of his courtesy name Xiang Tao 香涛
- "Xin Shuai 馨帅" (Chinese, "Aromatic Marshall") – Sun Chuanfang, Zhili clique warlord and protégé of the "Jade Marshal" Wu Peifu (1874–1939)., because of his courtesy name Xin Yuan 馨远
- "Xiao Ba Wang 小霸王" (Chinese, "Little Hegemon-King"), also "Zhi'er 猘兒" (Chinese, roughly "Impulsive and Brave Lad") – Sun Ce, general and warlord of the late Eastern Han dynasty, for his bravery
- "Xiao Wei Yuan Zhang 小委员长" (Chinese, "Little Chairman"), – Chen Cheng, Chinese political and military leader, and one of the main National Revolutionary Army commanders during the Second Sino-Japanese War and the Chinese Civil War, because Chiang Kai-Shek was often referred to as 'Chairman', thus to describe Chen's position as second-in-command
- "Xiao Zhuge 小诸葛" (Chinese, "Little Zhuge Liang"), – Bai Chongxi, Chinese general in the National Revolutionary Army of the Republic of China (ROC) and a prominent Chinese Nationalist leader., for his many battlefield exploits during the Northern expedition
- "Xue Ping Gui 薛平贵" (Chinese, literally "Xue the Parity and Expensive") – Xue Yue, Chinese Nationalist military general, given to him by the Hunanese people for his interference in the price of rice in Hunan for the war effort

== Y ==
- "Ye Canzuo 叶参座" (Chinese, "Chief of Staff Ye") – Ye Jianying, Chinese communist general, Marshal of the People's Liberation Army.
- "Yellow Hair" – Hal Moore, US Army Lieutenant General, Veteran of World War II, Korean War, and Vietnam War
- "Yi Shen Shi Dan 一身是胆" (Chinese, literally "a body of bravery") – Zhao Yun, general who lived in the late Eastern Han dynasty and early Three Kingdoms period, for his numerous acts of bravery, especially in the Battle of Han River
- "Yoo Hoo" – Benjamin Lear, US Army officer whose career spanned from the Spanish-American War to WWII.
- "Yu Shuai 玉帥" (Chinese, "Jade Marshall") – Wu Peifu, major figure in the struggles between the warlords who dominated Republican China from 1916 to 1927, because of his courtesy name Zi Yu 子玉
- "Yu Shuai 雨帅" (Chinese, "Rain Marshall") – Zhang Zuolin, warlord of Manchuria from 1916–28, during the Warlord Era in China, because of his courtesy name Yu Ting 雨亭
- "Yue Wangye 岳王爷" (Chinese, roughly "Royal Highness Yue") – Yue Fei, military general who served the Southern Song dynasty, for his posthumous rank which became a household nickname
- "Yurufun" (Japanese, meaning roughly "droopy drawers") – Shimada Shigetaro, Japanese admiral in World War II

== Z ==
- "Zenci" (Turkish for Black) – Zenci Musa, Black Turkish Military volunteer, Amir and Intelligence officer of the Special Organization
- "Zhou Lang 周郎" (Chinese, "Zhou the Youth") – Zhou Yu, military general and strategist serving under the late Eastern Han warlord Sun Ce, for his youth, good looks and impressive battle record
- "Ziggy" – Clifton Sprague, US admiral in World War II
- "Zulu" – Albert Gerald Lewis South African WW2 pilot

== See also ==
- Nickname
- Lists of nicknames – nickname list articles on Wikipedia
