= Roy S. Benson =

Commander Submarine Force U.S. Pacific Fleet

Roy Stanley Benson
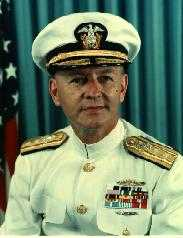
- Roy Stanley Benson
- Born: December 7, 1906; Concord, New Hampshire, U.S.
- Died: February 7, 1995 (aged 88); Washington, D.C., U.S.
- Burial place: US Naval Academy Cemetery
- Military career
- Allegiance: United States of America
- Branch: United States Navy
- Service years: 1929–1969
- Rank: Rear Admiral
- Nicknames: Ensign, Pigboat Benny
- Commands: USS Trigger (SS-237); USS Razorback (SS-394); Submarine Division 43; Submarine Development Group Two; USS Bayfield (APA-33); Amphibious Squadron Six; Cruiser Division One; Submarine Force., U.S. Pacific Fleet; First Naval District; Boston Naval Base
- Conflicts: World War II; Battle of Midway; Cold War; Korean War
- Awards: Navy Cross (2); Silver Star (2); Legion of Merit (3)

Roy Stanley Benson (December 7, 1906 – February 7, 1995), nicknamed "Ensign", was a veteran submarine commander in World War II who later served as the Commander Submarine Force U.S. Pacific Fleet (COMSUBPAC) during the Cold War.

== Naval career ==
Roy Stanley Benson entered the United States Naval Academy in 1925. He graduated and commissioned as an Ensign in June 1929.

=== Pre-War Service ===
Ensign Benson served on the battleship USS New York (BB-34) until December 1930, and then served three years on the destroyer USS Smith Thompson (DD-212) operating with the Asiatic Fleet. Benson was promoted to lieutenant (junior grade) in 1932.

In June 1934, Lt. (jg) Benson reported in June 1934 for submarine instruction at the New London Submarine Base, in New London, Connecticut. Completing the course in December 1934, Benson subsequently served on submarines R-14, S-42, and S-27. Benson was promoted to lieutenant in 1937.

Lt Benson served as an instructor in navigation at the U.S. Naval Academy from June 1937 to May 1939. One of the midshipmen in his navigational classes was Edward L. Beach Jr. who would later serve with Benson during World War II.

In June 1939, Benson joined the destroyer USS Hovey as its executive officer. In February 1941, he reported for duty on the submarine USS Nautilus (SS-168) also as its executive officer.

=== World War II ===
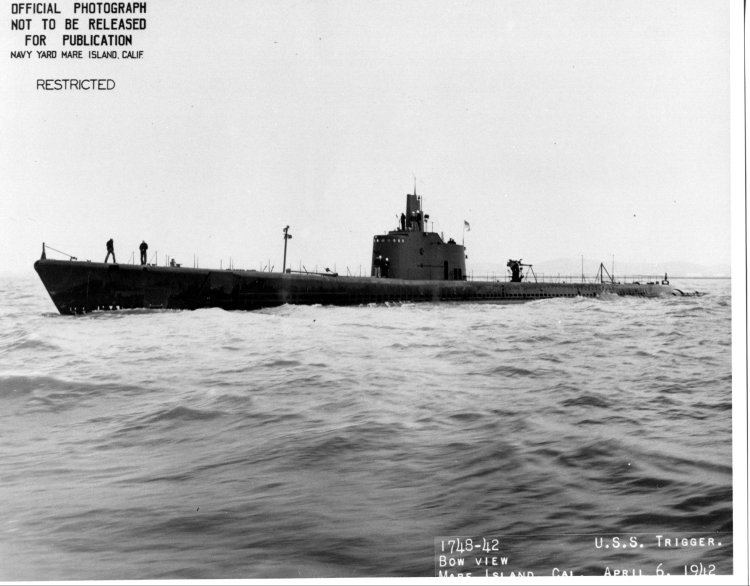
USS Trigger

Benson received a Letter of Commendation, with authorization to wear the Commendation Ribbon, for his role as executive officer and navigator on the USS Nautilus during the Battle of Midway. The Nautilus also received the Presidential Unit Citation for this engagement. Benson was promoted to lieutenant commander in 1942.

After brief duty on the staff of Submarine Squadron 10, Benson assumed command of the submarine USS Trigger (SS-237) on August 29, 1942. Edward L. Beach would later credit Benson's leadership during the next four war patrols for restoring the crew's morale. Ironically, Benson's most far-reaching contribution to the submarine campaign against the Japanese Empire was the failure to sink the aircraft carrier Hiyō during his final war patrol as Trigger's skipper. This proved to be the "final straw" for Vice Admiral Charles A. Lockwood, the Commander Submarines Pacfific Fleet (COMSUBPAC), who ordered the magnetic exploders be deactivated on the trouble-plagued Mark 14 torpedo.

For distinguished service in command of the Trigger, Benson was awarded the Navy Cross, a Gold Star in lieu of a second Navy Cross, a Silver Star Medal, and a Gold Star in lieu of a second Silver Star Medal. Trigger also received the Presidential Unit Citation. He was promoted to commander in 1943.

Relieved of command of the Trigger in July 1943, he was placed in command of the Prospective Submarine Commanding Officer's School at the New London Submarine Base.

From June to October 1944, Benson commanded the submarine USS Razorback (SS-394) and later commanded Submarine Division 43. Benson led a wolfpack consisting of Razorback, Trepang (SS-412), and Segundo (SS-398) that set sail on November 5, 1944. Operating in the Luzon Strait and the South China Sea, a convoy of seven escorted merchant ships was sighted and the three submarines made night attacks, sinking all of the merchant vessels, on December 6.

Benson led another wolfpack consisting of Razorback, Segundo, and Seacat (SS-399) that set out for the East China Sea on February 1, 1945. Razorback sank four wooden ships in three separate surface gun actions and deposited three Japanese prisoners at Guam. Segundo attacked Japanese shipping off the Korean coast, sinking a cargo ship on March 11. Seacat attacked Japanese shipping off the coast of Kyūshū.

For outstanding services while in command of Submarine Division 43, Benson was awarded the Legion of Merit.

=== Cold War ===
Detached from sea duty in July 1945, Benson reported for duty in the Operational Readiness Section, Headquarters of the Commander in Chief, U.S. Fleet, at the Navy Department, in Washington, D.C. He was promoted to captain in 1945.

In March 1947, Benson was ordered to duty on the staff of the commander, Submarine Force U.S. Atlantic Fleet, as readiness and new developments office, becoming its war plans and intelligence officer in 1948.

In March 1949, Benson became the first commander of Submarine Development Group Two (COMSUBDEVGRU Two), tasked to conduct ASW research and development, when that unit was commissioned on May 9, 1948. In this capacity, Benson was responsible for the evolution of early post-war submarine tactics code-named Project Kayo. Commodore Benson remain in command COMSUBDEVGRU Two until August 1950.

After serving a two-year stint as the director of public information, Office of Information in the Pentagon, Benson attended the National War College from August 1952 to June 1953.

From the July 1953 to June 1954 Benson commanded the attack transport USS Bayfield (APA-33) with the United States Seventh Fleet, and from August 1954 to August 1955, was the commander Amphibious Squadron Six with the Sixth Fleet operating in the Mediterranean.

In September 1955, Benson was assigned to the Bureau of Naval Personnel, and on August 8, 1956, became assistant chief of Naval personnel (education and training) with the rank of rear admiral.

On May 2, 1957, Admiral Benson assumed command of Cruiser Division One in Yokosuka, Japan. In June 1958, he became deputy commander in chief of staff, Military Sea Transportation Service, with headquarters in Washington, D.C. In March 1960 he assumed command of the Submarine Force, U.S. Pacific Fleet (COMSUBPAC), with headquarters at Pearl Harbor, Hawaii

From September 1962 to June 1966, Benson was Assistant Vice Chief of Naval Operations and Director of Naval Administration, Navy Department, after which he served as director of a special task force until February 1969.

In April 1967 he reported as commandant of the First Naval District, with additional duty as commander of the Boston Naval Base.

Rear Admiral Roy Stanley Benson retired on January 1, 1969.

== Awards and decorations ==
Benson received the Navy Cross with Gold Star, the Silver Star Medal with Gold Star, the Legion of Merit with two Gold Stars, Commendation Ribbon, and the Presidential Unit Citation Ribbon with two stars.

He also received he Yangtze Service Medal; American Defense Service Medal, Fleet Clasp; American Campaign Medal; Asiatic-Pacific Campaign Medal with three stars; World War II Victory Medal; National Defense Service Medal with bronze star; Korean Service Medal; United Nations Service Medal; and the Philippine Liberation Ribbon.

Benson also was awarded the Royal Order of the Sword, Commander, First Class, from the Government of Sweden; Grand Star of Military Merit by the Government of Chile; and Peruvian Cross for Naval Merit (Grand Officer) Distantivo Blanco by the Government of Peru.

=== Navy Cross ===
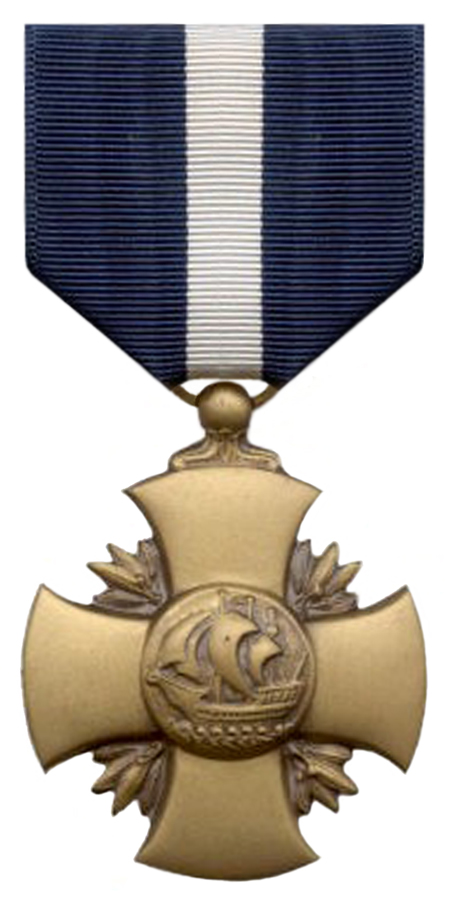

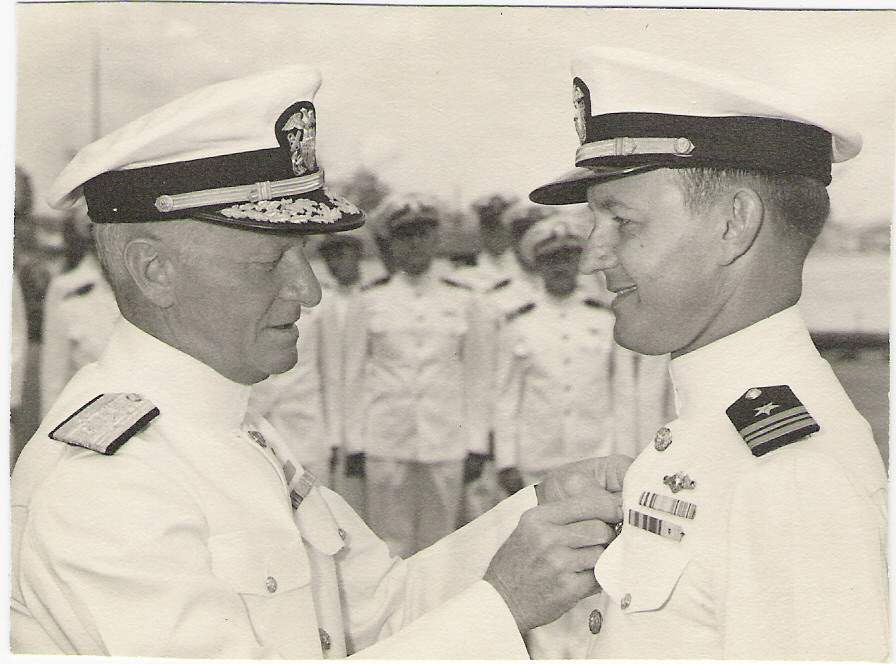
Lt. Commander Roy S. Benson of the USS Trigger receives his second Navy Cross from Admiral Chester W. Nimitz

Commander-in-Chief Pacific Fleet (CINCPAC) Serial 32 (1943):

Citation
The Navy Cross is presented to Roy S. Benson, Lieutenant Commander, United States Navy, for gallantry and intrepidity in action as Commanding Officer of the U.S.S. TRIGGER (SS-237) on the Third War Patrol of that submarine during the period 3 December 1942 to 22 January 1943, in enemy controlled waters of the Sea of Japan. Lieutenant Commander Benson, by his skill and excellent judgment maneuvered his ship, undetected, into an assigned area or laying mines, successfully conducted the mine laying operation and observed the destruction of one 8,400 ton enemy vessel from the mines laid by his submarine. He then carried out aggressive and skillful torpedo attacks resulting in the sinking of 15,271 tons of enemy shipping. Despite enemy counter efforts he brought his submarine through without damage to material or injury to personnel. His conduct throughout was an inspiration to his officers and men and in keeping with the highest traditions of the United States Naval Service.

Bureau of Naval Personnel Information Bulletin No. 324 (March 1944):

Citation
The Navy Cross (First Gold Star) is presented to Roy S. Benson, Lieutenant Commander, United States Navy, for gallantry and intrepidity in action as Commanding Officer of the U.S.S. TRIGGER (SS-237) on the Fifth War Patrol of that submarine during the period 30 April 1943 to 21 June 1943, in enemy controlled waters of the Japanese coast line. Lieutenant Commander Benson directed the operations and torpedo fire of his vessel with splendid initiative and expert tactical skill. On one occasion on 28 May 1943, his ship was responsible for severe damaging of an enemy aircraft carrier. Lieutenant Commander Benson contributed greatly to the success of his command in sinking an important amount of Japanese shipping. His conduct throughout was an inspiration to his officers and men and in keeping with the highest traditions of the United States Naval Service.

=== Silver Star ===
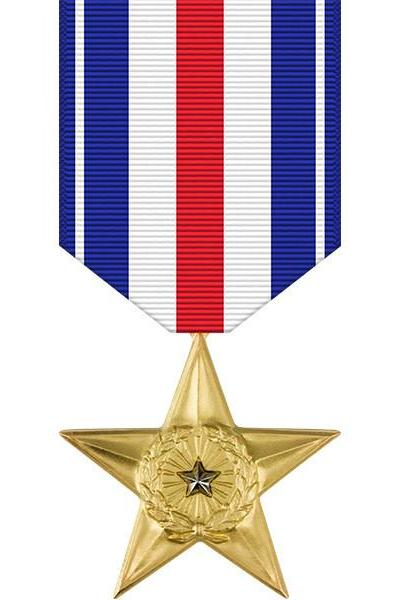

Citation
For conspicuous gallantry and intrepidity … as Commanding Officer of the USS TRIGGER during a submarine patrol in enemy-controlled waters …spent close to the Japanese homeland. With great courage and daring, [he] pressed home the attacks against enemy forces and, as a result, the TRIGGER sank one freighter of 5,000 tons and damaged 24,100 tons of enemy shipping … bringing his vessel back to port with no material damage and with his crew in excellent fighting spirit.

Gold Star in lieu of second Silver Star Medal:

Citation
For gallantry and intrepidity in action… as Commanding Officer of a United States Submarine during a war patrol of that vessel. Despite adverse weather conditions, his determination and tenacity enabled him to deliver successful attacks, which damaged or sank more than 21,000 tons of enemy shipping. His conduct throughout was an inspiration to his officers and men and in keeping with the highest traditions of the United States Naval Service.

=== Legion of Merit ===
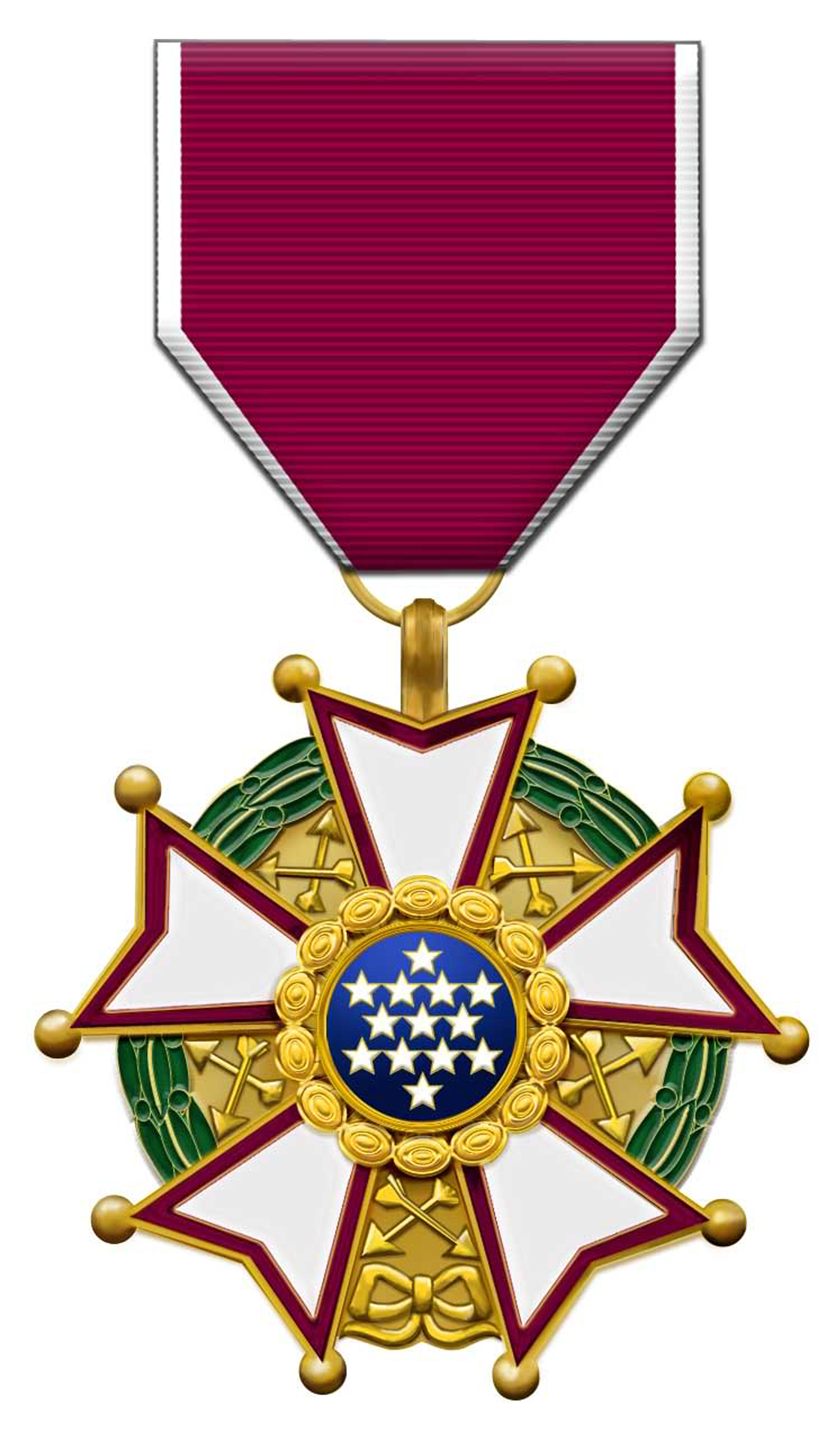

Citation
... He made many material contributions to the training, overhaul and general readiness of submarines in his division. During this time, submarines under his command completed many war patrols which resulted in the sinking and damaging of many thousands of tons of enemy shipping. Much of the credit for the many successful war patrols and the severe damage inflicted upon the enemy was due to his efficient administration, excellent judgment and inspiring leadership ...

Gold Star in lieu of the Second Legion of Merit (1967):

Citation
As Assistant Vice Chief of Naval Operations/Director of Naval Administration, Rear Admiral Benson consistently demonstrated outstanding leadership, resourcefulness and managerial ability in planning, organizing and coordinating the many diverse activities of his office. He was deeply involved in the planning for, and implementation of, the reorganization of the Navy Department and, in March 1966, directed the preliminary work leading to the preparation of studies and analysis which became part of the data input to the Task Force which he was designated to direct. As Director of a Task Force to study the structure of the Department of Navy incident to the unilinear organization effected in May 1966, Rear Admiral Benson inspired confidence and created an atmosphere of objective and rational approach to the many problems of a complex organization and its related intricate tasks and responsibilities, contributing in large measure toward the implementation of many of the recommendations of the Task Force even before its final plan and recommendation had been promulgated. His tact, diplomacy and adroitness in gaining the acceptance of officials involved in these recommendations was a major achievement in itself ...

Gold Star in lieu of the Second Legion of Merit (1969):

Citation
... Rear Admiral Benson displayed skilled diplomacy, sound judgment, and outstanding leadership in coordinating the activities of the many Naval commands in his area, thereby greatly enhancing the support provided to the operating forces of the Navy. His relationship with the civilian community was particularly exemplary and was characterized by mutual respect and vigorous action in solving mutual problems. [His] thorough knowledge of the organization and management of the Navy, coupled with his ability to communicate with conviction and expertise, made him an invaluable asset in enhancing the position of the Navy. Through his personal attention and constant support of recruitment in the Regular Navy and the Naval Reserve, he contributed greatly to the success of the Navy recruiting program in the first naval District. Largely due to [his] skillful guidance, the First Naval District was commended by the Department of Defense for the excellent summer recreation program offered to disadvantaged youths of the area ...

=== Presidential Unit Citation - USS Trigger ===

Citation
For outstanding performance in combat during her Fifth, Sixth, and Seventh War Patrols against the enemy. Employing highly daring and hazardous tactics, the USS TRIGGER struck at the enemy with consistent aggressiveness, seeking out and pursuing her targets with dogged determination regardless of unfavorable attack conditions. Her exceptionally notable record of severe damage inflicted on hostile shipping and the gallant fighting spirit of her officers and men reflect great credit upon the United States Naval Service

== Personal ==
In 1949, Benson married the former Vida Wimbrow Connole (1917–1965) of Annapolis, Maryland, widow of Commander David R. Connole who was the last commanding officer of the submarine Trigger which was lost off Japan in March 1945. Mrs. Benson was the sponsor at the launch of the new post-war submarine Trigger, with Edward L. Beach as its first commanding officer, on June 14, 1951. Admiral Benson and Mrs. Benson are interred at the United States Naval Academy Cemetery, and are survived by Rickart Alan Connole (b. 1944).

Regarding the fate of his fellow submariners in the Cold War era, Benson noted:

I think submariners fared very well indeed in the peacetime years; not because they were submariners, nor in spite of it. They simply did a good job in other assignments.
