= USS Porpoise (SS-172) =

Submarine of the United States

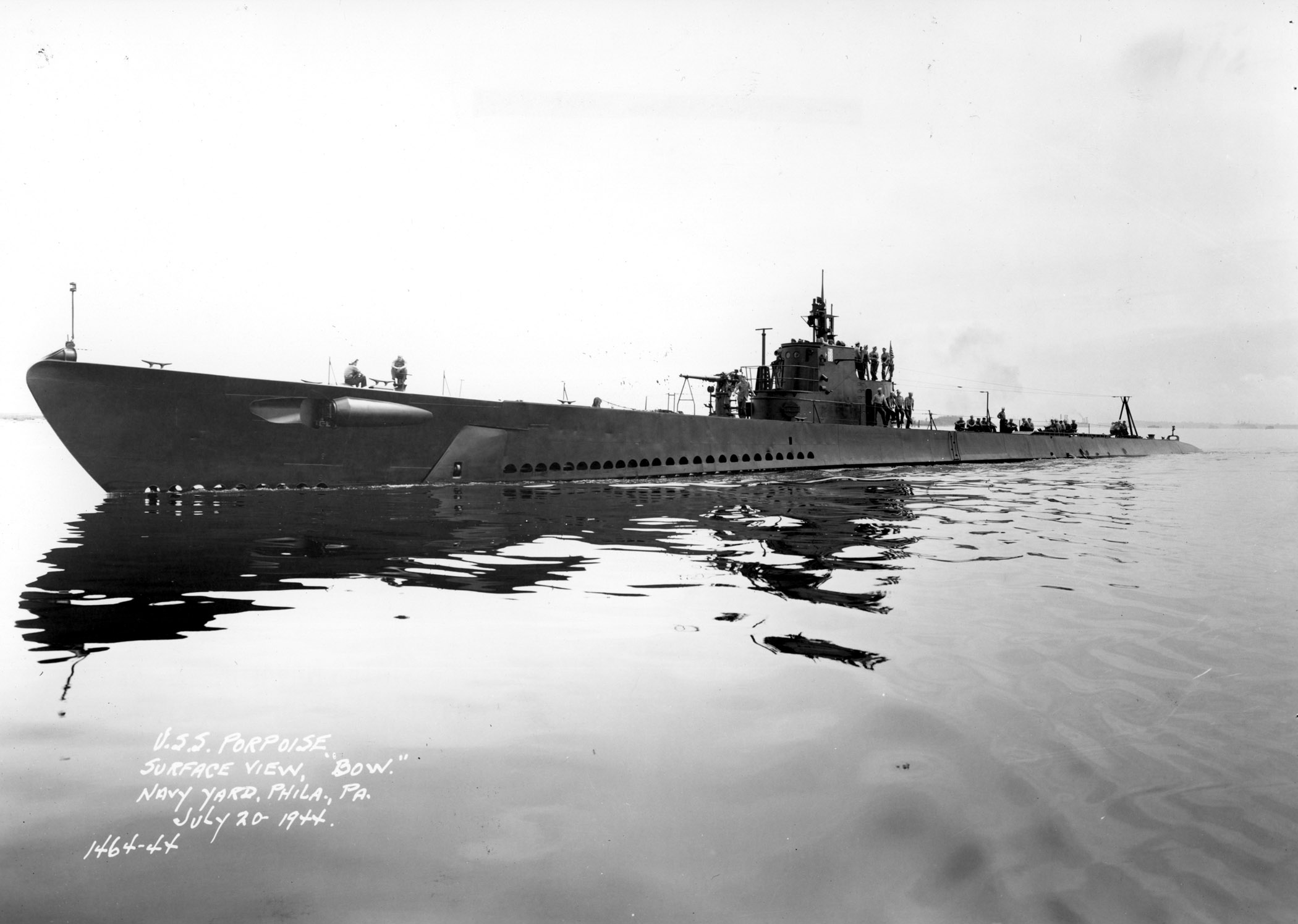
- USS Porpoise (SS-172)

History

United States
- Builder: Portsmouth Naval Shipyard, Kittery, Maine
- Laid down: 27 October 1933
- Launched: 20 June 1935
- Commissioned: 15 August 1935
- Decommissioned: 15 November 1945
- Stricken: 13 August 1956
- Fate: Sold for scrap 14 May 1957

General characteristics
- Class & type: Porpoise-class diesel-electric submarine
- Displacement: 1,310 long tons (1,330 t) standard, surfaced, 1,934 long tons (1,965 t) submerged
- Length: 283 ft 0 in (86.26 m) (waterline), 301 ft 0 in (91.74 m) (overall)
- Beam: 24 ft 11 3/4 in (7.614 m)
- Draft: 13 ft 10 in (4.22 m)
- Propulsion: As Built: 4 × Winton Model 16-201A 16-cylinder two-cycle diesel engines, 1,300 hp (970 kW) each, driving electrical generators through reduction gears, 2 × 120-cell Exide VL31B batteries, 4 × high-speed Elliott electric motors, total 2,085 hp (1,555 kW) three General Motors six-cylinder four-cycle 6-228 auxiliary diesels; Re-engined (1942): 4 × GM two-cycle Model 12-278A diesels, 1,200 hp (0.89 MW) each, two shafts
- Speed: 19 kn (35 km/h) surfaced, 8 kn (15 km/h) submerged
- Range: 6,000 nmi (11,000 km) at 10 kn (19 km/h), 22,000 nmi (41,000 km) @ 8 kn (15 km/h) with fuel in the main ballast tanks, (bunkerage 93,129 US gallons (352,530 L) maximum, 89,945 US gallons (340,480 L) typical, 1944)
- Endurance: 10 hours @ 5 kn (9.3 km/h), 36 hours at minimum speed submerged
- Test depth: 250 ft (76 m)
- Complement: 5 officers, 9 chief petty officers, 42 enlisted (1944)
- Armament: 6 × 21 inch (533 mm) torpedo tubes (four forward, two aft; 16 torpedoes), (two external bow tubes added 1942), 1 × 3 in (76 mm)/50 cal deck gun, 2 × 0.3 cal (7.62 mm) machineguns

USS Porpoise (SS–172), the fifth United States Navy ship to bear her name, was the lead ship of her class of submarines.

== Construction and commissioning ==
Porpoise was laid down at the Portsmouth Naval Shipyard in Kittery, Maine, on 27 October 1933. She was launched on 20 June 1935, sponsored by Miss Eva Croft, and commissioned on 15 August 1935, Lieutenant Commander Stuart S. Murray in command.

== Service history ==
=== Inter-war period ===
After shakedown, Porpoise transited the Panama Canal and joined the Pacific Fleet at San Diego on 1 September 1936. After gunnery and torpedo practice off the west coast of the United States, she participated in Fleet Problem XVIII in the Hawaiian area, April–May 1937, and toward the end of the year underwent extensive overhaul at Mare Island Navy Yard. In January 1938, she returned to Pearl Harbor for fleet exercises, and on 19 November 1939 got underway for Manila to join the Asiatic Fleet. From December 1939-December 1941, she was engaged in various exercises with Submarines, Asiatic Fleet.

=== World War II ===
At the outbreak of the war with Japan with the Japanese attack on Pearl Harbor on 7 December 1941, Porpoise, commanded by Joseph A. Callaghan, was at Olongapo in the Philippine Islands, undergoing a refit. With all four main engines being overhauled and her entire after battery out, the required work was accomplished in record time. She moved to Manila on 20 December, and two days later was underway on her first war patrol - which lasted from 22 December 1941 to 31 January 1942 - in Lingayen Gulf and the South China Sea off French Indochina. Retiring by way of Balikpapan, Borneo, where the Dutch were demolishing their oil wells, Porpoise attacked two ships without result before ending her patrol at Surabaya, Java.

Conducting her second war patrol in the Netherlands East Indies from 9 February to 30 March 1942, Porpoise scored on a cargo ship before anchoring at Fremantle, Western Australia. Then, with the ultimate destination of Pearl Harbor, she returned to the Netherlands East Indies for her third war patrol, which lasted from 26 April to 17 June 1942. She made one unsuccessful attack on a cargo ship and rescued five airmen off the enemy held island of Ju before heading out across the Pacific.

After a major overhaul at Mare Island, Porpoise departed Pearl Harbor for her fourth war patrol - from 30 November 1942 to 15 January 1943 - off the coast of Honshū, Japan. On 1 January 1943, she sank Renzan Maru, then set course for Midway where she completed the patrol. Her fifth war patrol - which lasted from 6 February to 15 April 1943 - off Jaluit Atoll, was highlighted by the sinking of Koa Maru on 4 April.

After refit at Pearl Harbor, Porpoise sailed on her sixth patrol - which lasted from 20 June to 28 July 1943 - performing reconnaissance of Taroa Island and in the Marshall Islands. Scoring hits on two cargo ships early in her patrol, she then sank Mikage Maru No. 20 on 19 July 1943 before returning to Pearl Harbor.

Due to leaky fuel oil tanks Porpoise departed Pearl Harbor on 12 August 1943 bound for New London, Connecticut, where she was to be used as a training vessel. During her voyage, an Allied tanker mistakenly opened gunfire on her in the Pacific Ocean on 13 August 1943, but Porpoise maneuvered away southward on the surface and sustained no damage. She arrived at New London in September 1943, and interrupted only for overhaul at Philadelphia, Pennsylvania, from May to June 1944, she served on training duty there until inactivated. She decommissioned on 15 November 1945 at Boston, Massachusetts, and remained in reserve until 8 May 1947, when she was placed in service and assigned to the 8th Naval District. For the next nine years she trained United States Naval Reserve personnel in the Houston, Texas, area. Stricken from the Naval Vessel Register on 13 August 1956, she was sold for scrap to Southern Scrap Material Company, Ltd., of New Orleans, Louisiana, on 14 May 1957.

== Awards ==
- Asiatic-Pacific Campaign Medal with five battle stars for World War II service
