= USS Trigger (SS-237) =

United States Navy submarine

Coordinates: 32°16′N 132°05′E

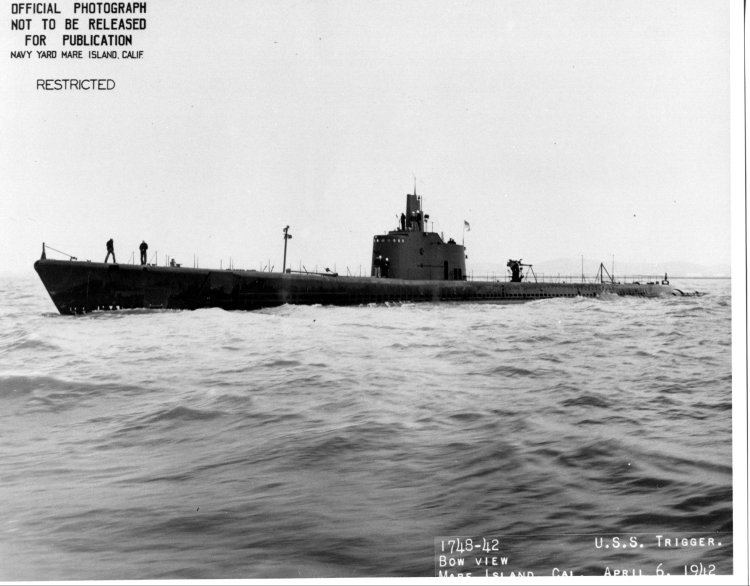
- USS Trigger (SS-237) underway off Mare Island Navy Yard, 6 April 1942

History

United States
- Name: Trigger
- Builder: Mare Island Naval Shipyard
- Laid down: 1 February 1941
- Launched: 22 October 1941
- Sponsored by: Mrs. Walter N. Vernou
- Commissioned: 31 January 1942
- Fate: Sunk 28 March 1945
- Stricken: 11 July 1945

General characteristics
- Class & type: Gato-class diesel-electric submarine
- Displacement: 1,525 long tons (1,549 t) surfaced; 2,424 long tons (2,463 t) submerged
- Length: 311 ft 9 in (95.02 m)
- Beam: 27 ft 3 in (8.31 m)
- Draft: 17 ft (5.2 m) maximum
- Propulsion: 4 × Fairbanks-Morse Model 38D8-⅛ 9-cylinder opposed piston diesel engines driving electrical generators; 2 × 126-cell Sargo batteries; 4 × high-speed General Electric electric motors with reduction gears; two propellers; 5,400 shp (4.0 MW) surfaced; 2,740 shp (2.0 MW) submerged
- Speed: 21 kn (39 km/h; 24 mph) surfaced; 9 kn (17 km/h; 10 mph) submerged
- Range: 11,000 nmi (20,000 km) surfaced at 10 kn (19 km/h)
- Endurance: 48 hours at 2 kn (4 km/h) submerged; 75 days on patrol
- Test depth: 300 ft (90 m)
- Complement: 6 officers, 54 enlisted
- Armament: 10 × 21-inch (533 mm) torpedo tubes; 6 forward, 4 aft; 24 torpedoes; 1 × 3-inch (76 mm) / 50 caliber deck gun; Bofors 40 mm and Oerlikon 20 mm cannon

USS Trigger (SS-237) was a Gato-class submarine, the first ship of the United States Navy to be named for the triggerfish.

== Construction ==
Trigger's keel was laid down on 1 February 1941 at Mare Island, California, by the Mare Island Navy Yard. She was launched on 22 October 1941, sponsored by Mrs. Walter N. Vernou, and commissioned on 30 January 1942.

== Battle of Midway ==
The submarine sailed for Hawaii on 22 May and reached Pearl Harbor the following week. She sortied for Midway Island with Task Group 7.2 (TG 7.2) on 29 May in anticipation of a Japanese attack on that island. Her station during the ensuing Battle of Midway was northeast of Midway, but her usefulness was curtailed when she ran aground. She freed from her grounding and returned to Pearl Harbor on 9 June.

== First patrol: June–August 1942 ==
On 26 June, Trigger got underway for the Aleutian Islands to patrol an area west of Cape Wrangell, Attu Island. She encountered six destroyers, three freighters and a patrol boat, attacking none, before calling at Dutch Harbor on 8 August en route back to Hawaii.

== Second patrol: September–November 1942 ==
Roy S. Benson assumed command before Trigger began her second war patrol, conducted from 23 September to 8 November in "Empire Waters" (the seas immediately surrounding Japan). In the early morning hours of 5 October, the submarine sighted smoke on the horizon and headed for it. A vessel soon appeared, coming toward the submarine. As the target approached, the submarine identified it as a small ship. Trigger then surfaced and manned her machine guns. As the target neared, however, the submarine learned that the Japanese ship was larger than initially thought. Enemy shells soon began exploding close to Trigger, and the 4,000 ton ship turned and accelerated in an attempt to ram the submarine. Trigger barely avoided a collision as she submerged for an attack; she launched two torpedoes and heard one hit. She then surfaced and gave chase, only to have the target again open fire. The submarine missed with three more torpedoes and then discontinued the pursuit.

Before dawn on the morning of 17 October, Trigger made a surface attack on a freighter off the Bungo Suido. She fired two spreads of torpedoes which sank Holland Maru with her guns still firing. That night, a destroyer came out of Bungo Suido and dropped a string of depth charges near the submarine. Trigger launched three torpedoes "down the throat" at the onrushing destroyer and, one minute later, observed an explosion so powerful it threw enough flame and water into the air to obscure the target. When the air cleared, the enemy ship was still intact, suggesting Trigger's first torpedo may have exploded prematurely, detonating the next two by its turbulence. The submarine fired one more torpedo as the enemy disappeared, but failed to score a hit.

Near midnight of 20 October, Trigger fired a spread of four torpedoes from very close range, 900 yards (820 m), in a surface attack on a 10,000-ton tanker. Two torpedoes hit the enemy ship as it turned in an attempt to ram. The submarine went to 100 feet (30 m) to evade a counterattack, and heard a heavy explosion as either gasoline, magazines, or boilers blew up. Trigger then came up to periscope level but found nothing in sight. (This sinking was not confirmed by JANAC postwar.) Four days later, Trigger attacked a large enemy tanker in ballast. A spread of three torpedoes produced three observed hits, one near the target's stern. The screws of the enemy ship stopped, and she began emitting heavy white smoke aft, but she soon got underway again. Trigger fired her last torpedo at the ship as it was moving off and missed. That night, she surfaced and began her homeward voyage.

== Third patrol: December 1942–January 1943 ==
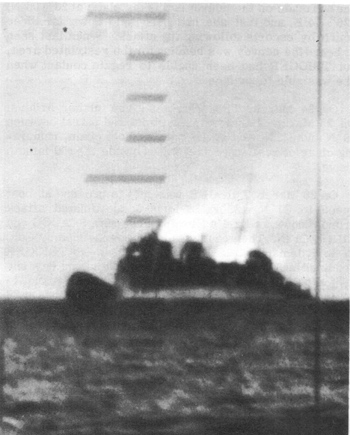
Periscope camera shot from USS Trigger, of the sinking of Imperial Japanese Navy destroyer Okikaze.

From 3 December 1942 to 22 January 1943, the submarine conducted a combined minelaying and offensive patrol, again in waters surrounding the Japanese home islands. On 20 December, she began planting a minefield off Inubo Saki, Honshū. Trigger planted the northern half of the field and was working on the southern part when a cargo ship passed her, heading into the newly-laid mines. Five minutes later, a violent explosion rocked the freighter which sank while an escort circled her. The submarine later heard another explosion from the direction of the minefield and, when she surfaced the next day, found the field was covered by smoke.

On 22 December, Trigger sighted a ship approaching from Uraga and made a surface attack. A spread of three torpedoes produced one hit forward of the bridge, and the target started to settle by the bow. The submarine fired one more torpedo into the ship and, when last seen, Teifuku Maru was awash forward with her screws nearly out of the water. On 31 December 1942, she attacked a cargo ship loaded with planes. Trigger fired three torpedoes from extremely close range 700 yards (640 m), and watched two hit. The target began to list to starboard and was down by the bow. Sound reported a heavy secondary explosion. The submarine came up to periscope level and saw the freighter with her stern high out of the water and a destroyer approaching. Trigger went deep and when she next came up for a look, there was nothing to be seen. (The sinking was not confirmed by JANAC postwar.)

On 10 January 1943, a Japanese destroyer approached Trigger, and the submarine fired three torpedoes from 1,600 yards (1,500 m). One hit under the well deck and folded the destroyer's forecastle up at a 45° angle, and another hit the target's stern. Soon, the Minekaze-class destroyer Okikaze sank on an even keel.

== Fourth patrol: February–April 1943 ==
Trigger stood out of Midway on 13 February to patrol off the Palau Islands. Two weeks later, she launched four torpedoes at a freighter, but the target managed to steer between them. Heavy air cover prevented a second attack. On 4 March, the submarine attacked a freighter in a rain squall, but all three of her torpedoes missed. On 15 March, Trigger sighted a convoy steaming in two columns. There were two freighters in the right hand column and three in the left, with an escort on the outboard bow of each column. Trigger worked her way between the two columns and launched three torpedoes at each of the leading ships. She hit the lead freighter in the left hand column twice but missed her target on the right because it unexpectedly changed course. Trigger then fired three more torpedoes at the right lead ship at just 700 yards (640 m) and observed two hits before the escorts forced her to go deep. When she surfaced again, there was nothing to be seen. Trigger was later officially credited with having sunk Momoha Maru, a 3,103-ton cargo ship.

That night, the submarine fired six torpedoes at a ship that was being towed by a smaller freighter. Five of the torpedoes missed, and the sixth made a circular run and passed over the submarine's engine room. A shaken crew broke off the attack.

On 20 March, the submarine launched three torpedoes at the lead ship in a convoy of four cargo ships. One hit caused the target to list 10° to port and stop, but it soon got underway and rejoined the convoy. Trigger terminated the patrol at the Submarine Base, Pearl Harbor, on 6 April.

== Fifth patrol: April–June 1943 ==
Between 30 April and 22 June, the submarine made a patrol which returned her to Empire waters. Directed by an Ultra from Pearl Harbor, Trigger lay athwart the projected track of Admiral Koga's task force returning from Truk. Koga's force came in sight the morning of 22 May, but zigged away, out of range, "a bitter disappointment". On 28 May, Trigger contacted two freighters off Iro Saki and fired three torpedoes at the larger. One hit aft. When last seen, the ship was down by the stern. The next day, the submarine fired a spread of three torpedoes at a small cargo ship. Two missed and the third exploded prematurely. She then fired a fourth torpedo, which apparently hit but failed to explode.

On 1 June, the submarine was searching for Japanese shipping off Sagami Nada when she sighted two columns of smoke. She closed the range toward a firing position, made out two cargo ships, and fired a spread of three torpedoes at each target. Hit in her stern, the lead ship, Noborikawa Maru, sank immediately. The second ship saw the torpedo wakes, turned and passed between them. Trigger then fired a torpedo at the oncoming ship; if the torpedo reached the target, it failed to explode.

Again alerted by Ultra, on 10 June (her last day on station), Trigger sighted an aircraft carrier protected by two destroyers. She closed and fired six torpedoes from only 1,200 yards (1,100 m). Although as she went deep the submarine heard four explosions, postwar accounting showed two of the torpedoes missed ahead and one failed to explode. The escorts kept Trigger down for several hours. The damaged Hiyō limped into Tokyo Bay and was out of action for almost a year. Admiral Lockwood (COMSUBPAC), who knew Hiyō's fate, was furious. Had the torpedoes functioned correctly, Benson would have sunk her. The next day, Trigger began her return voyage to Pearl Harbor; just after her triumphant return, the Mark 14 torpedo's defective Mark 6 exploder was ordered deactivated.

== Sixth patrol: September 1943 ==
On 1 September, after a yard overhaul, Trigger (now in the charge of Commander Robert "Dusty" Dornin) was ready to begin her sixth war patrol. The patrol took her into the East China Sea, off the China coast, north of Formosa. On 17 September, she made two hits on a Japanese freighter, one aft and one on the bow, but both torpedoes proved to be duds. The next day, she again contacted the same ship and launched four torpedoes at her. One struck Yowa Maru, and the 6,435-ton cargo ship slid beneath the waves.

21 September was Trigger's best day. She was patrolling some 30 miles (48 km) north of the Hoka Sho light when she sighted a convoy of three tankers and three freighters protected by Japanese planes. The submarine attacked the tankers first, firing three torpedoes at the leader and three at the second. One hit aft was seen on the lead tanker, and flames shot over 500 feet (150 m) into the air. The target's crew, dressed in whites, could be seen running forward to escape the fire. One torpedo hit the second tanker amidships, and it broke in half beneath the stack and sank immediately. Trigger turned and fired three stern tubes at the third tanker. This target swung toward the submarine, and all three torpedoes missed. Trigger then fired another torpedo which hit that ship's starboard side. When the submarine went deep, Dornin slipped and fell into the periscope well as the quartermaster was lowering it. He supported himself on his elbows, and the quartermaster heard his shouts in time to prevent a serious accident. Sonar reported two more explosions before the submarine came back up to periscope depth to resume the attack. Trigger fired two bow torpedoes at the third freighter in the column and scored two hits on the target which went down by the bow. The submarine then made two more attacks on the freighter, but all of her torpedoes either missed or were duds. During the three and one-half hours of action, Trigger sank two tankers, Shiriya and Shoyo Maru, and a freighter, Argun Maru, for a total of 20,660 tons of enemy shipping. The submarine returned to Midway on 30 September to be refitted and rearmed.

== Seventh patrol: October–December 1943 ==
The East China Sea and Yellow Sea were Trigger's objective for her seventh patrol. She stood out of Midway on 22 October and proceeded to her patrol area. At 22:00 on 1 November, she sighted a convoy that was steaming in two columns. When a ship in the nearer column overlapped one in the more distant group, Trigger fired a spread of three torpedoes at them. One torpedo struck the nearer freighter in the bow and one hit the farther ship amidships. The submarine saw the nearer ship go down by the bow, before she herself was forced to go deep where she was severely depth-charged by two escorts.

Early the next morning (2 November), Trigger launched three torpedoes at a freighter and scored one hit. At 00:50, she attacked the ship again with another three-torpedo spread. Two of them hit forward, and Yawata Maru went down, bow first, in a vertical plunge. Two hours and 25 minutes later, Trigger launched three torpedoes at a 7,148-ton transport. All hit, and Delagoa Maru disintegrated. On 5 November, the submarine attacked a convoy of three cargo ships protected by one destroyer and two planes. Trigger fired three bow tubes at the second ship in the convoy and one bow tube at the third before going deep to avoid the escort which dropped 20 depth charges. Thinking she was clear, the submarine came to periscope depth and was greeted by five near bomb misses.

On 13 November, Trigger made a submerged approach on a convoy of nine merchantmen and four escorts. After the Japanese ships zigged, the submarine found herself between two columns of ships, but Trigger had no torpedoes remaining in her bow tubes. She emptied her stern tubes at the last and biggest ship, believed to be a transport, from a pointblank range, 800 yards (730 m). The target, which carried a large deck cargo, took one hit aft and one under her stack. The submarine went deep, received a short depth charge attack, and came up to periscope depth to learn that her target had gone down. On 21 November, Trigger sighted a cargo ship and closed to 2,000 yards (1,800 m) before firing four torpedoes. Two hits started the victim down by the bow as the submarine's crew took turns at the periscope to watch Eizan Maru sink. More than a fortnight later, the submarine arrived at Pearl Harbor on 8 December 1943.

== Eighth patrol: January–February 1944 ==
Trigger stood out to sea on New Year's Day 1944 to begin her eighth war patrol, this time in the Truk-Guam shipping lanes. On 27 January, she sighted the conning tower of an Ro-class submarine dead ahead. Trigger set up to fire a bow shot from 800 yards (730 m). She came to periscope depth and saw the Japanese submarine, then less than 100 yards (91 m) away, was preparing to attack. Trigger submerged to 150 feet (50 m), expecting a torpedo at any minute, but sound heard no torpedo screws. She came up to periscope depth and saw the Japanese periscope so she decided to make an end around. When Trigger returned to periscope depth, the enemy had disappeared.

Four days later, she contacted a convoy of three ships accompanied by two Fubuki-class destroyers. The submarine scored two hits on the coastal minelayer Nasami, which disappeared in a cloud of smoke and debris. The nearer destroyer began closing the range, and Trigger missed it with four aft tubes. She caught up with the convoy again and fired five torpedoes at the last ship. Two hits produced flames that reached mast height and several secondary explosions that marked the end of the 11,933-ton converted submarine tender Yasukuni Maru. Over three weeks later, the submarine terminated the patrol when she arrived at Pearl Harbor on 23 February.

== Ninth patrol: March–May 1944 ==
On 23 March, Trigger (now in the able hands of Commander Frederick J. "Fritz" Harlfinger II, and still with "Ned" Beach as executive officer) headed for the Palau Islands on her ninth war patrol. In the early morning of 8 April, she contacted a convoy of approximately 20 large ships with an estimated 25 escorts, and closed to attack. When she raised her periscope, she saw a destroyer 150 feet (46 m) away firing at the scope and attempting to ram. The submarine loosed four torpedoes at the convoy and went deep as several more escorts joined the attack. On her way down, she heard four explosions. Trigger ran at 300 feet (91 m) or more for 17 hours as six escorts dogged her trail and rained down numerous depth charges. Six exploded extremely close. When the submarine surfaced, her forward torpedo room was flooded to her deck plates, and the hull air induction and most compartments were in about the same condition. The bow planes, trim pump, sound gear, and both radars were all dead. Her radio antenna was grounded, and the submarine could not transmit. The crew spent the next four days making repairs "by use of spares, baling wire, and considerable ingenuity."

Trigger met submarine USS Tang on 14 April and exchanged information by line gun. The next day, Trigger's executive officer went on board Tang by a rubber boat, to borrow an air compressor part and to make plans for a coordinated search and attack. On 18 April, Tang's executive officer delivered spare parts for the air compressor to Trigger, and she continued on patrol.

Shortly before midnight on 26 April, Trigger contacted a convoy of six ships off the eastern Palaus. She fired six torpedoes, from 2,400 yards (2,200 m), at four ships that were closely bunched and overlapping. Four hits were seen and heard, with a big explosion on each ship. Suddenly, a terrific explosion blew up one of the closer ships. One of the more distant ships stood straight up on her bow and sank immediately. At six minutes after midnight, Trigger launched three torpedoes at another group of ships and heard one timed explosion. At 01:57, she launched four torpedoes at a damaged cargo ship and two at an escort. The cargo ship received two more hits. Five minutes later, the submarine fired three stern tubes at a group of three escorts, and the middle one disappeared in a cloud of smoke. During the attack, Trigger sank the 11,739-ton passenger/cargo ship Miike Maru and heavily damaged the destroyer escort Kasado, the 9,467-ton cargo ship Hawaii Maru, and the 8,811 ton cargo ship Asosan Maru. Trigger returned to Pearl Harbor on 20 May and four days later, headed for the United States for a major overhaul. She arrived at San Francisco, California, on 31 May and, after overhaul, returned to Hawaii on 11 September.

== Tenth patrol: September–November 1944 ==
On 24 September, Trigger got underway to take station off the east coast of Formosa and perform life guard patrol for bomber strikes due on 12 October. The morning of the strikes, she rescued a pilot from aircraft carrier USS Bunker Hill whose burning plane had crash-landed nearby. On 19 October, as the invasion of the Philippines was about to begin, Trigger contacted a convoy of two Takao-class heavy cruisers, one Nagara-class cruiser, two other light cruisers, and several destroyers with air cover. Trigger had no chance to fire but reported the contact. On 30 October, she launched four torpedoes at a tanker but missed. She then fired another four from her stern tubes and heard one hit the target before running up the periscope to watch the other three blow off part of the stern, but the ship did not sink. Trigger went deep as 78 depth charges were rained down on her within the next hour, but caused no damage. The damaged 10,021-ton tanker Takane Maru was later sunk by submarines USS Salmon and USS Sterlet. The next morning, Trigger received word from Salmon that she had been heavily damaged by depth charges and was unable to submerge. Trigger rendezvoused with Salmon that night and was joined by USS Silversides and Sterlet to escort the damaged submarine to Saipan. They were provided with air cover from the Mariana Islands and arrived at Tanapag Harbor on 3 November. A week later, Trigger departed with six other submarines but was ordered to discontinue her patrol on 17 November and returned to Guam.

== Eleventh patrol: December 1944–February 1945 ==
On 28 December 1944, Trigger headed for the Bungo Suido-Kii Suido area to begin her 11th war patrol. At 21:05 on 3 January 1945, she sighted a light, and radar made a doubtful contact. Thirty minutes later, a torpedo passed by her starboard side. Trigger reversed course and cleared the area but returned two days later. That day, she sighted a periscope at 2,000 yards (1,800 m), and—realizing that instead of hunting, she was being hunted—she slipped away.

On 29 January, the submarine made radar contact from 23,000 yards (21,000 m) on a large convoy with six escorts and well covered by aircraft. As she closed, the moon came out bright and clear. An enemy bomber turned and started in as radar picked up another plane coming in astern at 5,000 yards (4,600 m). The submarine went deep, and the convoy slowly pulled away. The next day, the ship was ordered to terminate her patrol, and she returned to Guam on 3 February.

== Twelfth patrol: March 1945 ==
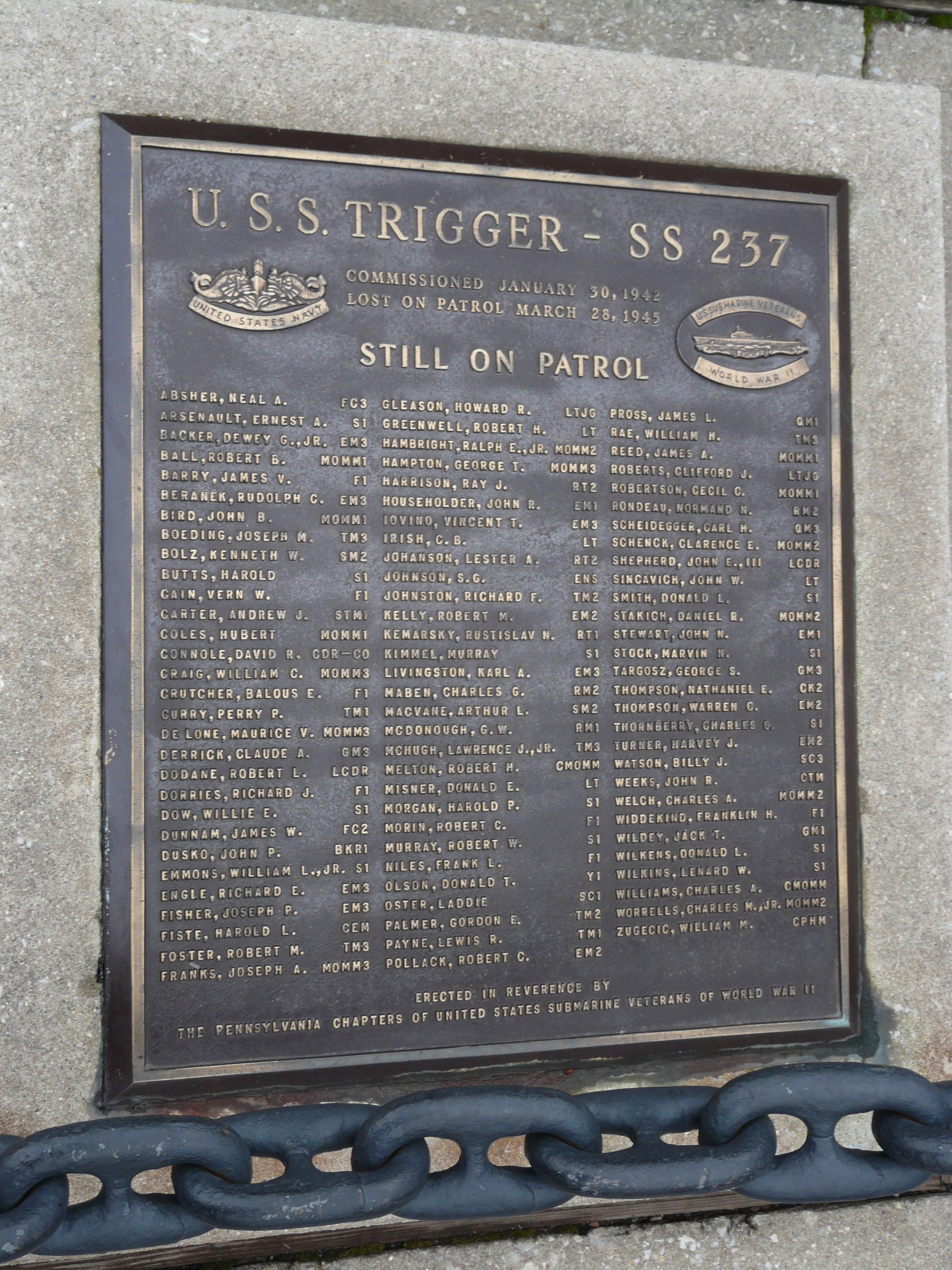
"USS Trigger Still on Patrol" plaque at the Independence Seaport Museum

Trigger (with new skipper Commander David R. Connole) stood out to sea on 11 March to begin her 12th war patrol and headed for the Nansei Shoto area. On 18 March, she attacked a convoy west of the islands, sinking the cargo ship Tsukushi Maru No.3 and damaging another. She reported the attack on 20 March, and the submarine was subsequently ordered to radio as many movements of the convoy as possible to help find a safe passage through a known mined area of the East China Sea. On 24 March, Trigger was ordered to begin patrolling west of the islands the next day, outside the 100-fathom (600 ft; 180 m) curve, and to steer clear of restricted areas. On 26 March, she was ordered to join a wolf pack called "Earl's Eliminators" and to acknowledge receipt of the message. A weather report came from the submarine that day but no confirmation of her having received the message. The weather report was Trigger's last transmission. On 4 April, she was ordered to proceed to Midway, but she had not arrived by 1 May and was reported as presumed lost.

Postwar records indicate she torpedoed and sank the repair ship Odate on 27 March. The next day, Japanese planes and ships joined in a two-hour attack on a submarine heard by Silversides, Sea Dog, Hackleback, and Threadfin in adjacent areas. Threadfin was the only one of these submarines attacked that day, and she reported hearing many depth charges and several heavy explosions east of her after the attack on her ceased. Postwar Japanese records showed a Japanese aircraft detected and bombed a submarine on 28 March 1945. Kaibokan Mikura, CD-33, and CD-59 were then guided to the spot and delivered an intensive depth charging. After two hours, a large oil slick appeared.

Trigger was stricken from the Naval Vessel Register on 11 July 1945.

Trigger was immortalized and eulogized in Beach's 1952 book Submarine!.

Destroyer escort USS Connole (DE-1056, later FF-1056) was named in honor of Commander David R. Connole.

== Awards ==
Trigger received 11 battle stars for World War II service, the Navy Unit Commendation for her ninth war patrol and the Presidential Unit Citation for her fifth, sixth, and seventh war patrols. She is credited with sinking 18 ships (tied with Seawolf and Rasher for seventh on the list of confirmed sinkings by number of ships), totaling 86,552 tons (seventh on the list of confirmed sinkings by tonnage), according to the official JANAC accounting postwar.

=== Presidential Unit Citation ===

Citation
For outstanding performance in combat during her Fifth, Sixth, and Seventh War Patrols against the enemy. Employing highly daring and hazardous tactics, the USS TRIGGER struck at the enemy with consistent aggressiveness, seeking out and pursuing her targets with dogged determination regardless of unfavorable attack conditions. Her exceptionally notable record of severe damage inflicted on hostile shipping and the gallant fighting spirit of her officers and men reflect great credit upon the United States Naval Service.

=== Navy Unit Commendation ===

Citation

For outstanding heroism in action against enemy Japanese shipping and combatant units during her Ninth War Patrol in the Palau Islands area from March 23 to May 20, 1944. Undaunted by numerous enemy escort vessels and desperately severe anti-submarine measures, the USS Trigger skillfully penetrated convoy screens to reach her targets ... She pressed home daring attacks to leave four freighters and a destroyer a mass of smoke and wreakage ... After seventeen hours of skillful evasion, to resurface and strike again at the enemy.

== See also ==
- List of most successful American submarines in World War II
