= Stuart S. Murray =

Stuart Shadrick Murray
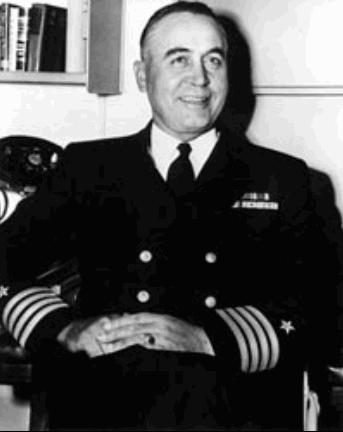
- Born: March 22, 1898; Delia, Texas, U.S.
- Died: 19 September 1980 (aged 82)
- Military career
- Allegiance: United States
- Branch: United States Navy
- Service years: 1919–1956
- Rank: Vice admiral
- Commands: USS Missouri; ComSubLant
- Conflicts: World War II; Cold War
- Awards: Legion of Merit

Stuart Shadrick Murray (22 March 1898 – 19 September 1980) was a vice admiral of the United States Navy who served during World War II.

== Early life and career ==
Born in Delia, Texas he graduated from the United States Naval Academy in 1919. In the 1920s, Murray was involved in constructing the submarine base at Pearl Harbor.

Nicknamed "Sunshine" and "the Gentle Giant", Murray was a plankowner aboard Porpoise, placing her in commission on 15 August 1935.

As ComSubDiv 15, in October 1941, he was assigned to Manila, home of the Asiatic Fleet. Along with Joseph Connolly's SubDiv 16, Murray's division made up Submarine Squadron 2 (SubRon2), under ComSubAsia Captain Walter Doyle (nicknamed "Red") in Holland, who answered to Admiral Thomas C. Hart. They comprised the entirety of the brand-new Salmon class.

== World War II ==
When the Japanese attacked the Philippines, Wilkes (who ended up being "special adviser" to Doyle, who had no experience in Asia), his chief of staff, Jimmy Fife, and Murray warned their skippers to be cautious. The initial plan, to rely on information from General Lewis Brereton's B-17 aircraft, failed the first day, when General MacArthur failed to preserve them from Japanese attack. Murray was not aided by the abysmal performance of the Mark 14 torpedo, either.

On Christmas Day 1941, Murray moved into quarters in the tunnels of Corregidor with all of ComSubAsia's top staff (him, Fife, Wilkes, and Doyle, everyone who had not fled with Canopus and equipment (one typewriter and a radio receiver). As the defeat became evident, Wilkes ordered all submarine crewmen out; on 1 January 1942, Murray boarded Chet Smith's Swordfish with Wilkes and others, to join Hart in Soerabaja.

After fleeing the Philippines, Hart pulled Murray's boats back to Fremantle (in keeping with Navy Department instructions), where Murray came under the command of his old boss from SubDiv 13 Charles Lockwood's Task Force 51, becoming chief of staff of SubRon 2, under Jimmy Fife (also one of Lockwood's old Division 13 skippers).

With the death of Robert H. English, Lockwood was named ComSubPac in his stead, taking Murray as his Chief of Staff (replacing John Griggs), over the objections of "Chips" Carpender, ComSubSoWestPac.

Near the end of 1943, Murray was named Commandant of Midshipmen at Annapolis, rather than to a new submarine squadron. Among the midshipmen at the Academy during Murray's tenure were future president Jimmy Carter and future vice admiral and Medal of Honor recipient James B. Stockdale.

Murray took command of the battleship USS Missouri in May 1945, and was responsible for the preparations for the signing of the Japanese surrender on 2 September 1945.

== Post war ==
Murray was ComSubLant from 1950 until 1952. Murray was promoted to vice admiral (three-star) on December 7, 1955 and assigned as Naval Inspector General. He retired in August 1956 and was promoted to admiral (four star) on the retired list in recognition of his wartime service.

== Awards ==
- Distinguished Service Medal
- Legion of Merit
- World War I Victory Medal
- American Defense Service Medal with "FLEET" clasp
- Asiatic-Pacific Campaign Medal with one battle star
- American Campaign Medal
- World War II Victory Medal
- Navy Occupation Medal
- National Defense Service Medal
- Philippine Defense Medal
