= Martin P. Hottel =

Decorated World War II commander

Martin Perry Hottel
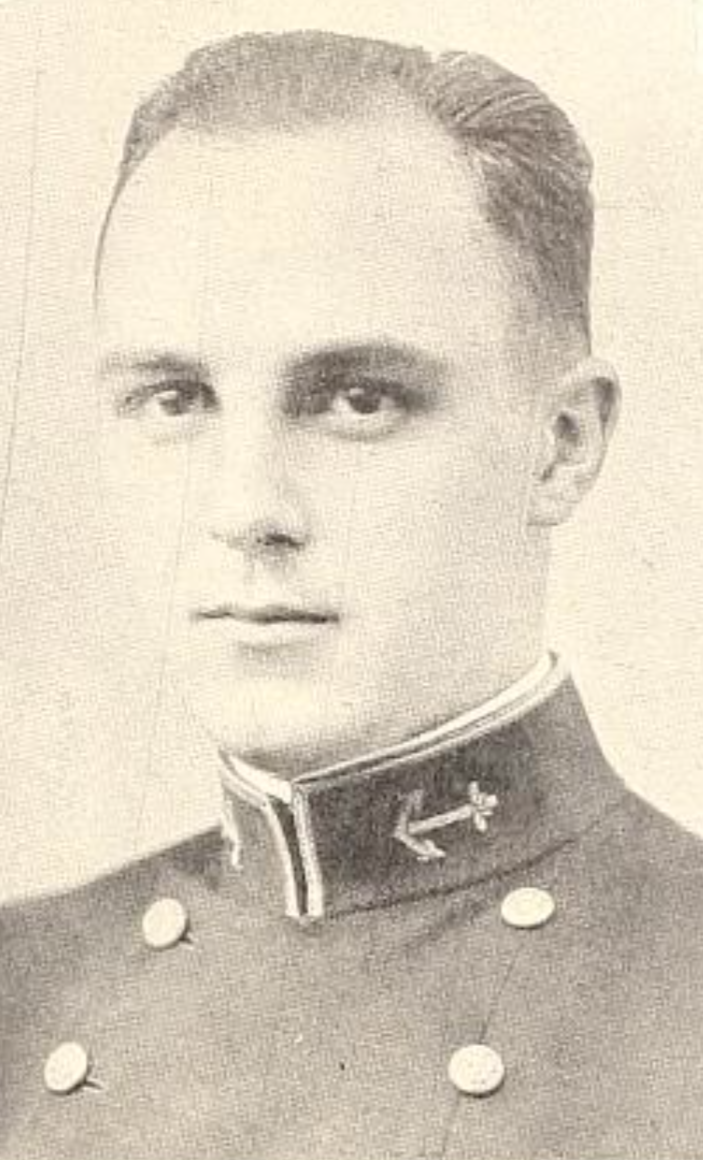
- Born: January 25, 1904; Washington, D.C., US
- Died: May 30, 1981 (aged 77); Virginia Beach, Virginia, US
- Alma mater: United States Naval Academy
- Spouse(s): Edith Boyer Gonzalez; Anna Mae Wilcox; Lucy Dabney Tunstall
- Relatives: RDML James F. Hottel (father)
- Military career
- Allegiance: United States
- Branch: United States Navy
- Service years: 1927-1949
- Rank: Rear Admiral
- Nickname: "Spike"
- Commands: USS R-4 (SS-81); USS Cuttlefish (SS-171); USS Grouper; Submarine Division 41
- Conflicts: World War II • Battle of Midway
- Awards: Legion of Merit (2); Bronze Star

Martin Perry Hottel (25 January 1904 – 30 May 1981), was a decorated submarine commander during World War II who reached the rank of rear admiral in the United States Navy.

Martin Perry Hottel was born to Coast Guard Rear Admiral James F. Hottel and Ruby Mallory Hottel (née Perry) in Washington D.C., 25 January 1904. Hottel received his appointment to the United States Naval Academy from Washington State and was admitted 6 July 1923. After graduating from Annapolis in 1927 and receiving his commission, Ensign Hottel reported for duty on board the USS New Mexico (BB-40). Ensign Hottel was promoted to lieutenant (junior grade) on 2 June 1930. LTJG Hottel then completed courses in submarine, torpedo, and chemical warfare, and was subsequently ordered to Submarine Division 3. LTJG Hottel's first submarine assignment was on board the S-10. In 1933 LTJG Hottel was list as being fully qualified in submarines, and by 1934 was qualified to command submarines. The rolling year Hottel was assigned to the Office of the Chief of Naval Operations and completed postgraduate course in general line duties. On 30 June 1936, LTJG Hottel was promoted to Lieutenant and assigned to the USS S-20 (SS-125). In 1936, LT Hottel took command of his first submarine, the USS R-4 (SS-81). In 1939, LT Hottel was listed as being assigned to the submarine base Coco Solo in Cativá, Panama. On the 1st of July 1941, LT Hottel was promoted to lieutenant commander and took command of the USS Cuttlefish (SS-171) on 30 Sep 1941. When Pearl Harbor was attacked by the Japanese, the USS Cuttlefish was at Mare Island Naval Shipyard receiving an overhaul.
