= Robert Edson Dornin =

American naval officer (1912–1982)

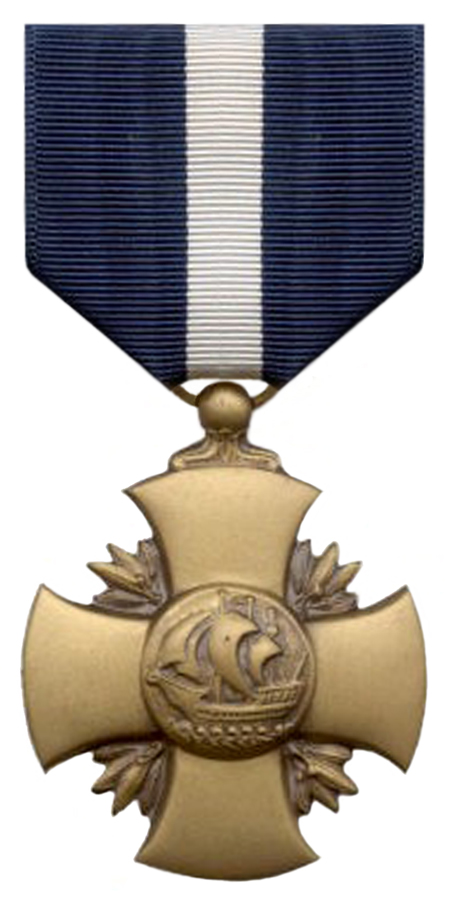
- Born: December 30, 1912; Berkeley, California, U.S.
- Died: August 31, 1982 (aged 69)
- Military career
- Allegiance: United States
- Branch: United States Navy
- Service years: 1935-1965
- Rank: Captain
- Commands: USS Trigger; USS Sea Fox; USS Nereus; USS Los Angeles
- Conflicts: World War II: U.S. submarine campaign against the Japanese Empire
- Awards: Navy Cross (2); Silver Star (4)

Robert Edson "Dusty" Dornin (December 30, 1912 – August 31, 1982) was a United States Navy officer who served in the Pacific Theater of World War II as a very successful submarine commander. He remained in the Navy until his retirement in 1965.

== Pre-war ==
Dornin entered the United States Naval Academy in 1931. He was an outstanding athlete on the basketball and lacrosse teams, but made his biggest mark in sports as a football end or wide receiver, teaming with Buzz Borries and Slade Cutter to form a powerful "troika" (numerous sources state he was an All-American, though he is not mentioned in the 1935 College Football All-America Team or any prior 1930s teams). Both his teammates would also distinguish themselves in the coming war, with Cutter also making his mark as a submariner. Cutter would later recall that Dornin "studied all the time"; he graduated 48th out of 442 in the Class of 1935.

After serving on the battleship USS New Mexico (1935–37) and the destroyer USS Perry (1937–38), he graduated from Submarine School (1938–39). He was a lieutenant aboard the submarine USS Plunger from 1939 to 1941.

== World War II ==
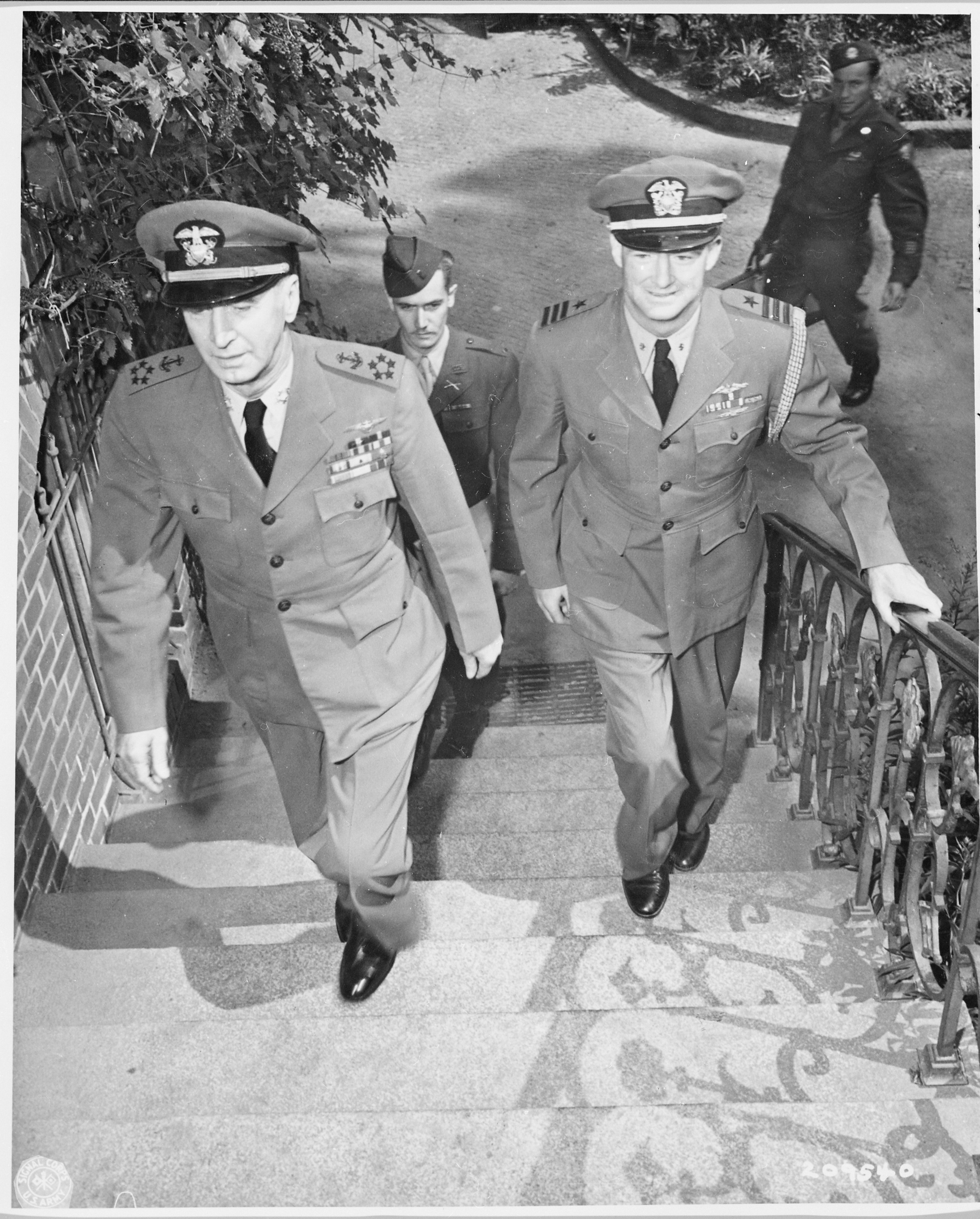
Admiral King and Commander Dornin (right front) at the Potsdam Conference, July 15, 1945

Dornin held the rank of lieutenant commander on USS Gudgeon from 1941 to 1943. After the sneak attack on Pearl Harbor on December 7, 1941, Gudgeon left four days later on the first American submarine war patrol of World War II, with Dornin as the fire control officer. The submarine I-173 became the first enemy warship sunk by an American submarine, courtesy of Gudgeon. Dornin eventually became the executive officer.

He was given command of USS Trigger in 1943. In September of that year, he left on his first patrol in Trigger, prowling the East China Sea north of Formosa. On September 17, Trigger sank the Japanese freighter Yowa Maru. Four days later, the tankers Shiriya and Shoyo Maru and the freighter Argun Maru fell victim to the submarine. Though faulty torpedoes had prevented an even higher score, Trigger concluded a very successful patrol, returning to Midway Island on September 30.

For Dornin's next patrol, he departed from Midway on October 22, bound for the East China and Yellow Seas. On November 1, Trigger scored hits on two freighters, one of which was seen to sink, before being forced to dive to evade depth-charge attacks by Japanese escort ships. The next day, the freighters Yawata Maru and Delagoa Maru were sent to the bottom several hours apart. On November 13, Trigger located a convoy and sank the largest ship, believed to be a transport. The last victim of the patrol was the freighter Eizan Maru on November 21. Trigger reached Pearl Harbor on December 8.

The third patrol began on January 1, 1944, targeting the Truk-Guam shipping lanes. On January 27, Trigger encountered an enemy Ro-class submarine. Neither managed to inflict any damage on the other before contact was lost. Four days later, Trigger sank the coastal minelayer Nasami and the converted submarine tender Yasukuni Maru. The patrol concluded with a return to Pearl Harbor on February 23.

USS Trigger was awarded the Presidential Unit Citation for her fifth, sixth and seventh patrols. Dornin was in command of the sixth and seventh.

With initial reluctance, after nine patrols (six in Gudgeon, three in Trigger), Commander Dornin became an aide to Chief of Naval Operations Admiral Ernest King, beginning in 1944. He accompanied King to the Yalta and Potsdam Conferences in 1945.

The Joint Army–Navy Assessment Committee credited him with ten ships (54,595 tons) sunk in three patrols in command of Trigger, putting him in a tie among American submarine commanders for 15th-21st by number of ships; his first Trigger patrol was also rated the 16th most successful of the war by tonnage (four ships totaling 27,095 tons).

== Post-war ==
After Admiral King retired in December 1945, Dornin became Fleet Admiral Chester W. Nimitz's aide.

Post-war postings include:

- Commanding Officer, USS Sea Fox (1946–47)
- Assistant Director of Athletics at the Naval Academy (1947–49)
- Commander Submarine Division 22 (1949–50)
- Chief of Staff, Officer Submarine Development Group (1950–52)
- Executive Officer, U. S. Naval Station, Treasure Island (1952–54)
- Commanding Officer, USS Nereus (1954–55)
- Commander Submarine Squadron Three, Pacific Fleet (1955–56)
- Commanding Officer, Recruit Training Command, at the U. S. Naval Training Center in San Diego (1956–59)
- Commanding Officer, USS Los Angeles (1960–61).

He retired in June 1965, his last position being the head of Long Beach Naval Station.

== Decorations ==
- Navy Cross with gold star (two awards)
- Silver Star with three gold stars (four awards)
- Presidential Unit Citation
- American Defense Service Medal with Fleet clasp
- Asiatic-Pacific Campaign Medal
- World War II Victory Medal
- National Defense Service Medal with star (two awards)

=== First Navy Cross citation (November 24, 1943) ===
The President of the United States of America takes pleasure in presenting the Navy Cross to Commander Robert Edson Dornin (NSN: 0-74888), United States Navy, for extraordinary heroism in the line of his profession as Commanding Officer of the U.S.S. TRIGGER (SS-237), on the SIXTH War Patrol of that submarine engaged in an aggressive and successful patrol against enemy Japanese in the Pacific War Area from 1 to 30 September 1943. Although operating in the presence of formidable concentrations of anti-submarine vessels, Commander Dornin pressed home a series of vigorous and persistent attacks which resulted in the sinking or damaging of an important amount of hostile shipping. Despite severe countermeasures on the part of the enemy, he brought his ship through and his crew home without material damage or loss of life. His expert seamanship and cool courage in the face of great personal danger were in keeping with the highest traditions of the United States Naval Service.

=== Second Navy Cross citation (February 18, 1944) ===
The President of the United States of America takes pleasure in presenting a Gold Star in lieu of a Second Award of the Navy Cross to Commander Robert Edson Dornin (NSN: 0-74888), United States Navy, for extraordinary heroism in the line of his profession as Commanding Officer of the U.S.S. TRIGGER (SS-237), on the SEVENTH War Patrol of that submarine in enemy controlled waters of the Pacific Area from 22 October 1943 to 8 December 1943. In a daring night engagement with a large, heavily escorted enemy convoy, Commander Dornin aggressively attacked and sank several Japanese ships before anti-submarine vessels forced him to submerge. Although subjected to a determined depth-charging by the enemy, he quickly regained the initiative and, fearlessly attacking the remaining ships, succeeded in sinking additional enemy vessels. Several days later, penetrating the destroyer screen of a heavily escorted Japanese convoy, he took further toll of hostile shipping. Commander Dornin's indomitable fighting spirit and superb seamanship reflect great credit upon himself, his command and the United States Naval Service.
