= 351st Air Refueling Squadron =

US Air Force unit

351st Air Refueling Squadron

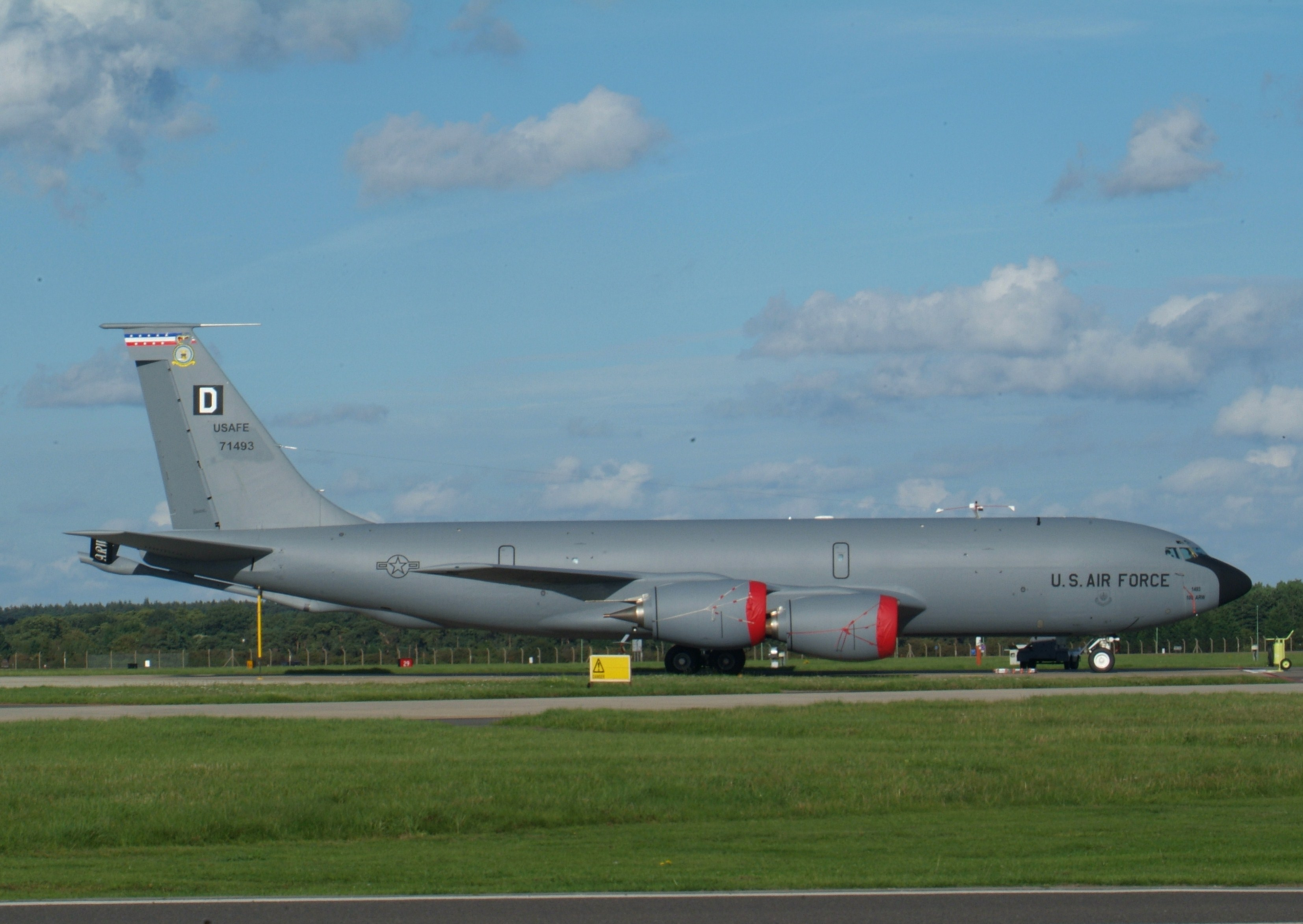
- Squadron KC-135R Stratotanker at RAF Mildenhall (Note: Aircraft is Boeing KC-135R, serial 57-1493, Wolff Pack. Built as Boeing KC-135A-BN, later re-engined as KC-135R. Named for a B-17F, serial 42-30061 that served with the 100th Bombardment Group in World War II. Baugher, Joe (29 April 2023). "1942 USAF Serial Numbers". Joe Baugher.)
- Active: 1942–1945; 1947–1949; 1956–1966; 1992–present
- Country: United States
- Branch: United States Air Force
- Role: Aerial refueling
- Part of: United States Air Forces in Europe
- Garrison/HQ: RAF Mildenhall
- Motto: Pax Opus Nostrum (Latin for 'Peace is our Profession')
- Equipment: KC-135R/T Stratotanker
- Engagements: European Theater of Operations; Gulf War; Kosovo War
- Decorations: Distinguished Unit Citation; Air Force Meritorious Unit Award; Air Force Outstanding Unit Award; French Croix de Guerre with Palm

Insignia
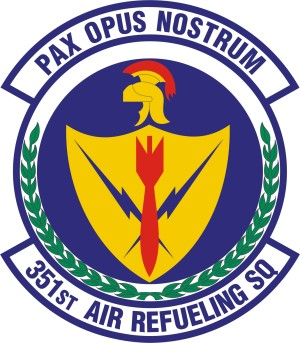
- 351st Air Refueling Squadron emblem (Note: Approved 16 September 1958. Description: On an Air Force blue disc bordered white, an Air Force golden yellow shield charged with two Air Force blue lightning streaks in saltire, surmounted by a red bomb in fess, pointing downward; above the shield an Air Force golden yellow helmet in profile with red plume; in the upper part of the border the motto, in the lower part of the border a green olive wreath.)

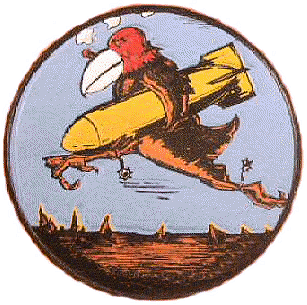
- Patch with 351st Bombardment Squadron emblem (World War II)
- World War II fuselage code: EP (1942–1945)
- Tail code: Square D (100th Group, World War II, 100th Wing 1992–present)

The 351st Air Refueling Squadron is a United States Air Force unit that is part of the 100th Air Refueling Wing at RAF Mildenhall, England. Since 1992, it has operated the Boeing KC-135R/T Stratotanker aircraft conducting primarily aerial refueling but also airlift and aeromedical evacuation missions.

The squadron was activated as the 351st Bombardment Squadron during World War II as a heavy bomber unit. It served in combat in the European Theater of Operations, where it earned a Distinguished Unit Citation and the French Croix de Guerre with Palm for its actions. After V-E Day the squadron returned to the United States and was inactivated at the port of embarkation.

The squadron was briefly active in the reserve from 1947 to 1949, but does not appear to have been fully equipped or manned. It served between 1956 and 1966 with Strategic Air Command as a bombardment unit, flying Boeing B-47 Stratojets.

== History ==
=== World War II ===
==== Organization and training for combat ====
The squadron was activated at Orlando Army Air Base, Florida on 1 June 1942 as one of the four original squadrons of the 100th Bombardment Group, It was intended to equip the squadron with Consolidated B-24 Liberators The Army Air Forces (AAF) decided to concentrate heavy bomber training under Second Air Force, and before the end of June, the squadron moved to Pendleton Field, Oregon. Its intended equipment changed to Boeing B-17 Flying Fortresses.

As a result, the squadron only began organizing in October 1942, after it had moved to Gowen Field, Idaho. Two days later, the squadron departed for Walla Walla Army Air Base, Washington. There the first aircrew arrived on 1 December 1942 and it received its first operational aircraft and began training.

The 351st completed its training and departed Kearney Army Air Field, Nebraska for the European Theater of Operations on 1 May 1943. The ground echelon sailed on the RMS Queen Elizabeth on 28 May, arriving at Greenock, Scotland on 3 June, while the air echelon flew via the northern ferry route to England about 21 May 1943.

==== Combat in the European Theater ====
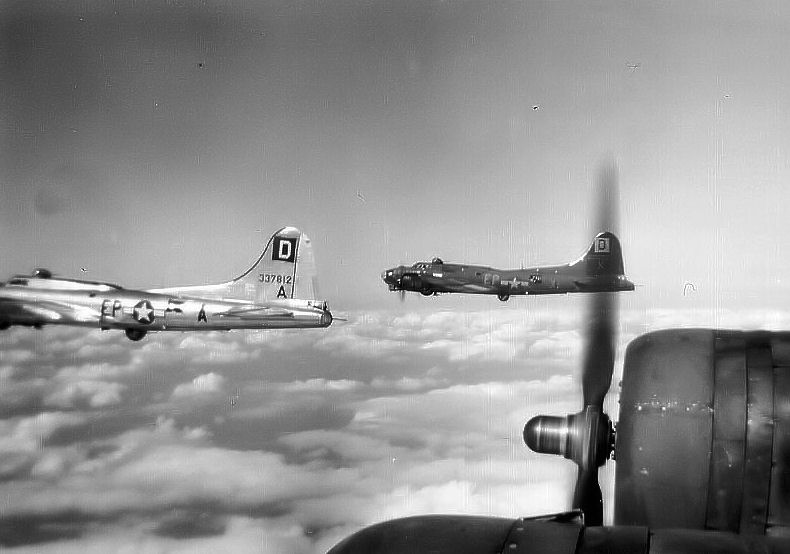
Boeing B-17 Flying Fortresses of the 351st on a mission in 1944.

The squadron established itself at its combat station, RAF Thorpe Abbotts, on 9 June 1943, flying its first combat mission on 25 June. Until the end of the war, the squadron was primarily employed in the strategic bombing campaign against Germany. Until January 1944, it concentrated its operations on airfields in France, and industrial targets and naval facilities in France and Germany. On 17 August 1943, it participated in an attack on a factory manufacturing Messerschmitt Bf 109 fighters in Regensburg, Germany, which seriously disrupted production of that plane. Although the mission called for fighter escort, the fighter group assigned to protect the squadron's formation missed the rendezvous and the wing formation proceeded to the target unescorted. Enemy fighter opposition focused on the low "box", formed in part by the squadron. Ten of the 21 Flying Fortresses flown by the 100th Group were lost on this mission. Unknown to AAF intelligence at the time, the attack also destroyed almost all of the fuselage construction equipment for Germany's secret Me 262 jet fighter. Rather than returning to England, the unit turned south and recovered at bases in North Africa. For this action, the squadron was awarded the Distinguished Unit Citation (DUC).

From January to May 1944, the 351st attacked airfields, industrial targets, marshalling yards, and missile sites in Western Europe. During Big Week, it participated in the concentrated attack on the German aircraft industry. In March, it conducted a series of long range attacks against Berlin, for which it was awarded a second DUC. The raid of 6 March was to be the costliest mission flown by Eighth Air Force during the war. German fighter controllers detected that the formation including the squadron was unprotected by fighter escorts and concentrated interceptor attacks on it. Twenty-three B-17s from the formation failed to return. (Note: In addition to the squadrons of the 100th Group, the formation included those of the 95th Bombardment Group.) Two days later, German fighters shot down the leader of the 45th Combat Bombardment Wing, and the 100th Group took the lead in another attack on Berlin. From the summer of 1944, the 351st concentrated on German oil production facilities.

The squadron was occasionally diverted from strategic bombing to perform interdiction and air support missions. It attacked bridges and gun positions to support Operation Overlord, the landings at Normandy in June 1944. In August and September it supported Operation Cobra, the breakout at Saint Lo, and bombed enemy positions in Brest. As Allied forces drove across Northern France toward the Siegfried Line in October and November, it attacked transportation and ground defenses. During the Battle of the Bulge in December 1944 and January 1945, it attacked lines of communication and fortified villages in the Ardennes. It provided support for Operation Varsity, the airborne assault across the Rhine in March 1945. The squadron was awarded the French Croix de Guerre with Palm for attacks on heavily defended sites and dropping supplies to the French Forces of the Interior.

The squadron flew its last mission on 20 April 1945. Following, V-E Day, the squadron was initially programmed to be part of the occupation forces in Germany, but that plan was cancelled in September, and between October and December, the squadron's planes were ferried back to the United States or transferred to other units in theater. Its remaining personnel returned to the United States in December and the squadron was inactivated at the Port of Embarkation on 19 December 1945.

==== "Bloody Hundredth" ====
Starting with the Regensburg mission of August 1943, the squadrons of the 100th Bombardment Group began suffering losses among the highest in VIII Bomber Command. On 8 October, it lost seven aircraft on a raid on Bremen, including its lead and deputy lead aircraft. Only two days later, it lost twelve aircraft on an attack on Münster, again including the lead aircraft. The only group plane returning from that mission had lost two engines and had two wounded on board. (Note: This plane, named Rosie's Riveter was lost in the spring of 1945, but its crew was able to bail out in Russian held territory.) Its highest one day loss occurred on the 6 March 1944 attack on Berlin, when 15 bombers failed to return. On 11 September 1944, the Luftwaffe put up its heaviest opposition in months, destroying 11 of the group's bombers. On 31 December 1944, half the 1st Bombardment Division's losses consisted of a dozen 100th bombers. With a group authorization of 40 B-17s, it lost 177 planes to enemy action. It became a legend for these losses and was referred to as the "Bloody Hundredth."

=== Air Force reserve ===
The squadron was activated in the reserve at Orlando Army Air Base, Florida on 17 July 1947 and assigned to the 100th Group, which was located at Miami Army Air Field, Florida. At Orlando, its training was supervised by Air Defense Command (ADC). As the post war Air Force took shape, the National Guard was considered the first line of reserve. Reserve units like the 351st got what was left over after National Guard units received facilities, equipment and aircraft. Aircraft were allotted to reserve units as a means of maintaining flying proficiency, not combat readiness. Aircraft assigned to the reserves were overwhelmingly trainers, and no heavy bombers were ever assigned. The allotment of units to the reserves was made only for planning purposes and mobilization plans called for personnel assigned to the 351st to be called to active duty during mobilization as individuals, not as a unit.

In 1948, Continental Air Command assumed responsibility for managing reserve and Air National Guard units from ADC. President Truman's reduced 1949 defense budget required reductions in the number of Air Force units. In May 1949, the Air Force reorganized its operational reserve forces into 25 wings located at 23 reserve training centers, a reduction of 18 training centers. As a result, the 351st was inactivated as manned flying operations at Orlando Air Force Base ceased.

=== Strategic Air Command bomber operations ===
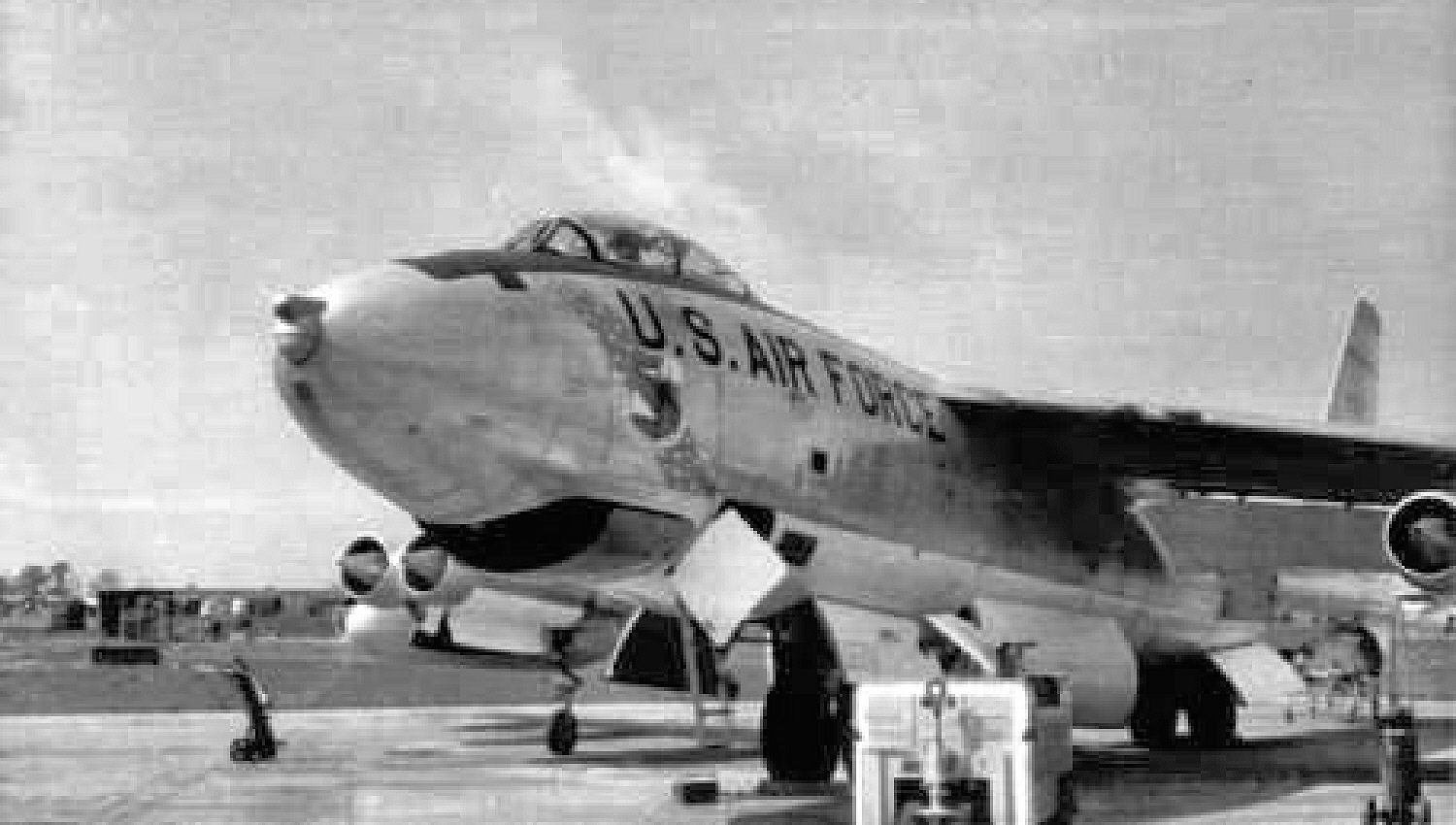
100th Wing B47 parked at a dispersal base

The squadron was activated at the start of 1956 as Strategic Air Command (SAC) opened Portsmouth Air Force Base, where it began to equip with Boeing B-47 Stratojets. From December 1957 until April 1958, it deployed to RAF Brize Norton, along with the rest of the 100th Bombardment Wing. Starting in 1958, the squadron began to assume an alert posture at its home station, now Pease Air Force Base, reducing the amount of time spent on alert at overseas bases. General Thomas S. Power had set an initial goal of maintaining one third of SAC's planes on fifteen minute ground alert, fully fueled and ready for combat to reduce vulnerability to a Soviet missile strike. This was increased to half the squadron's aircraft in 1962.

Soon after detection of Soviet missiles in Cuba, all SAC's degraded and adjusted alert sorties were brought up to full capability. SAC B-47s dispersed on 22 October. Most dispersal bases were civilian airfields with AF Reserve or Air National Guard units. B-47s were configured for execution of the Emergency War Order as soon as possible after dispersal. KC-97s were dispersed to Goose Air Base, Lajes Air Base and Harmon Air Force Base to provide refueling for the B-47s on increased alert status. On 15 November 1/6 of the squadron's dispersed B-47s were recalled to Pease. On 21 November SAC went to DEFCON 3. The squadron's remaining dispersed B-47s were recalled to Pease on 24 November. On 27 November it returned to normal alert posture.

The squadron continued operations until the end of 1965, when it began to phase down with the retirement of the B-47 from SAC. The squadron ceased all operations on 12 February 1966, inactivating on 15 June.

=== Air refueling ===
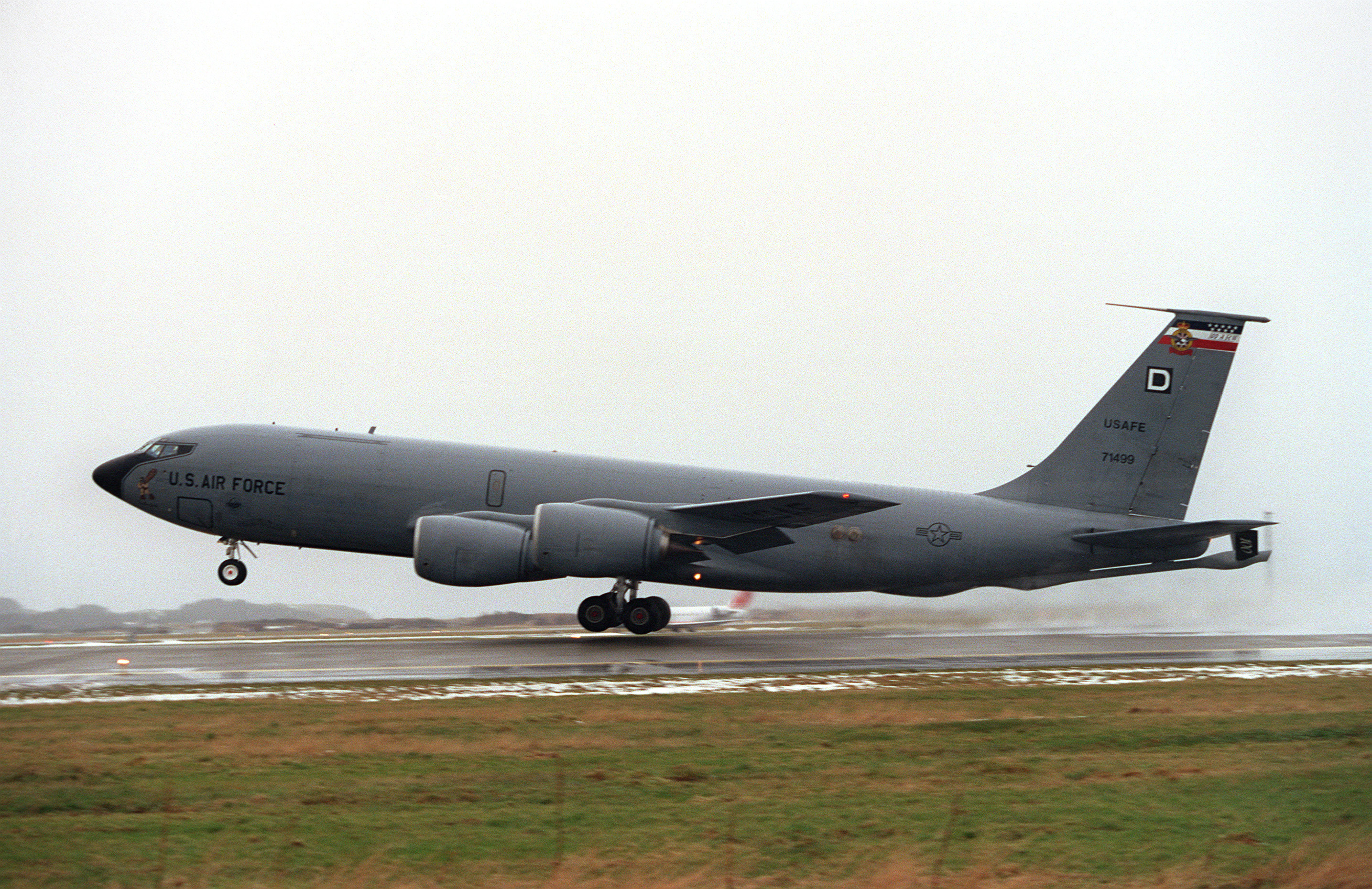
Squadron KC-135R Stratotanker departing Sola Air Station, Norway, 1998. (Note: Aircraft is Boeing KC-135R Stratotanker, serial 57-1499, The Big Stick. Baugher 1957 USAF Serial Numbers.)

The unit was redesignated the 351st Air Refueling Squadron and activated at RAF Mildenhall, Suffolk, in the United Kingdom on 31 March 1992, shortly after the 100th Air Refueling became the host at Mildenhall. The squadron became the only air refueling squadron permanently stationed in Europe, and began operating the Boeing KC-135R Stratotanker in May 1992, reaching its full complement of nine KC-135Rs in September 1992.

The squadron or deployed forces from the squadron supported major military operations in Europe through the rest of the decade. From 1993 to 1995, the squadron supported United States and NATO forces in Operation Deny Flight, the enforcement of the United Nations no-fly zone over Bosnia and Herzegovina. In 1999, elements supported Operation Allied Force, attacks on Serbian forces during the Kosovo War, as the 351st Expeditionary Air Refueling Squadron.

It also supported United States Central Command operations in Southwest Asia. Shortly after its activation, it supported Operation Provide Comfort, the defense of Kurds from Iraqi aggression. In 1992, it aided in Operation Restore Hope in Somalia. Beginning in 1997 it provided refueling for Operation Northern Watch, the enforcement of the no-fly zone in northern Iraq.

Starting in 1995, the squadron added regular airlift missions between Dover Air Force Base, Delaware and Mildenhall to relieve the Lockheed C-141 Starlifters of Air Mobility Command for other missions. In April 1996, the 351st contributed to Operation Assured Response, deploying three KC-135s to Dakar-Yoff International Airport, Senegal, to help support the evacuation of U.S. citizens and third country nationals from Liberia after fighting flared up in Monrovia during the First Liberian Civil War. After the European Tanker Task Force, which included the squadron plus deployed tankers, was ended on 28 November 1998, the number of KC-135s assigned to the 351st was increased to 15 tankers.

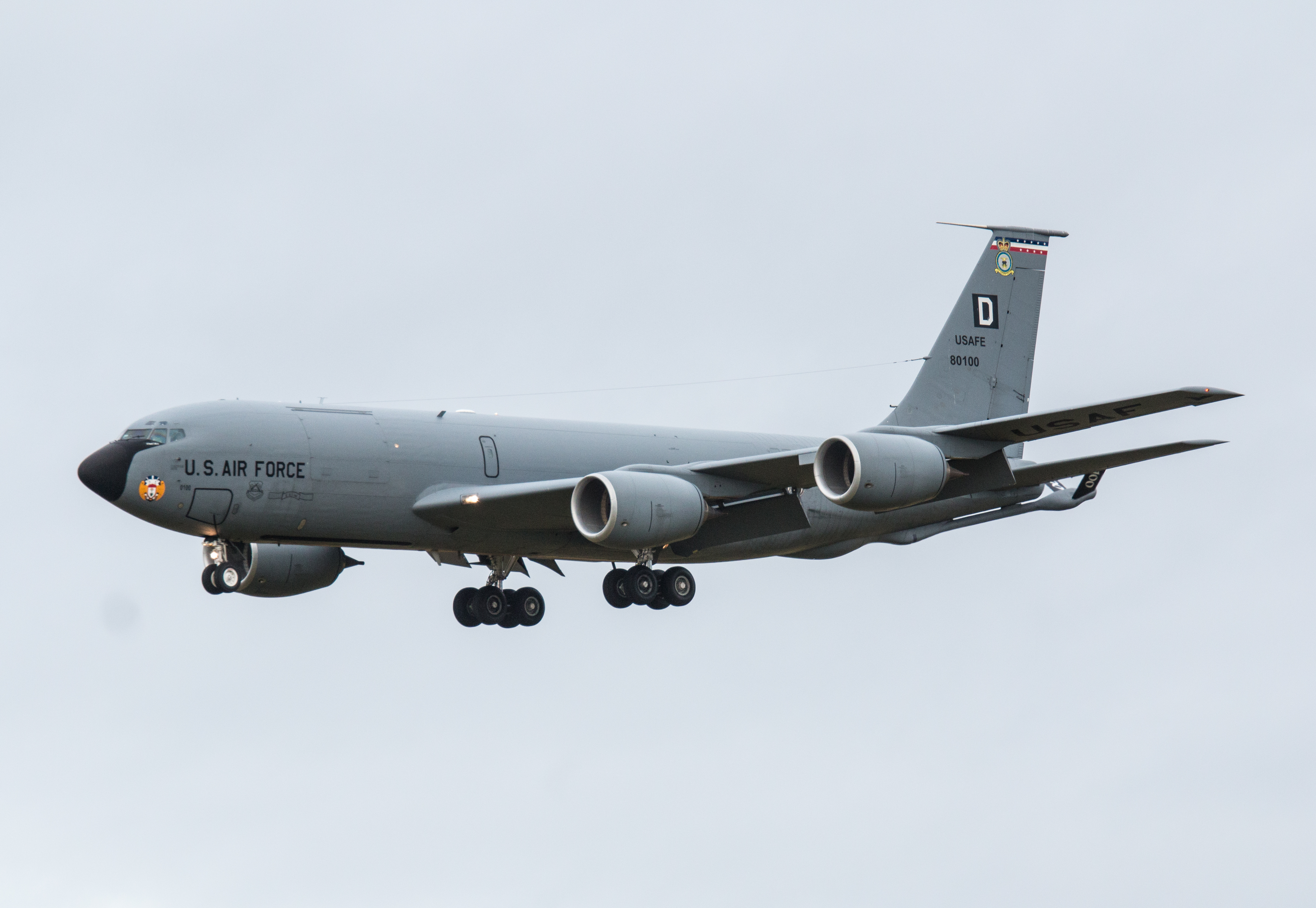
Squadron KC-135R Stratotanker arriving at RAF Lakenheath, 2013 (Note: Aircraft is Boeing KC-135R, serial 58-0100, built as KC-135A-BN. Earlier named 100 Proof. Aircraft has 100th Bombardment Group emblem on nose and carried fuselage code EP-A to commemorate the 75th anniversary of D-Day. Dirkx, Marco (6 May 2025). "1958 USAF Serial Numbers". Joe Baugher’s Serial Number List..)

In October 2001, the squadron deployed 12 tankers and support elements in support of Operation Enduring Freedom, forming the 351st Expeditionary Air Refueling Squadron. (Note: Expeditionary units are deemed separate units by the Air Force. When a regular unit is the major force provider for an expeditionary unit, the expeditionary unit takes its name from the major force provider, which is entitled to any honors earned by the expeditionary unit. AF Instruction 38-101, Manpower and Organization, 29 August 2019, para. 31.4.) Four went to Incirlik Air Base, Turkey; four to Rhein-Main Air Base, Germany; and a four to Souda Bay, Greece. On 23 November 2001, KC-135s deployed to Burgas Airport in Bulgaria, from where they conducted OEF missions.

In March 2011, the squadron deployed a portion of its KC-135 Stratotanker fleet to Istres-Le Tubé Air Base, France, again operating as the 351st Expeditionary Air Refueling Squadron, in support of Operation Unified Protector. This was the NATO enforcement of a United Nations imposed no-fly zone during the First Libyan civil war.

Stating in 2013, the squadron regularly deployed elements to Morón Air Base, Spain in support of Operation Juniper Micron – which aimed to assist French operations in Mali. The first deployment occurred on 13 January 2013.

The 351st participated in the 2020 Nigeria hostage rescue on 31 October, forward deploying six tankers to Morón Air Base from which it provided ingress and egress air refueling support as far forward as the border between Mali and Niger for the special forces conducting the operation.

The 2022 Russian invasion of Ukraine led to an increased number of sorties by the 351st, supporting NATO's Enhanced Air Policing. This operation, first introduced in 2014, after Russia's annexation of Crimea had a goal to demonstrate the resolve and defensive nature of NATO and deter Russia from aggression or the threat of aggression against NATO Allies. Policing operations take place in the Baltic nations in the north, and in Romania and Bulgaria in the south.

== Commemorative nose art ==
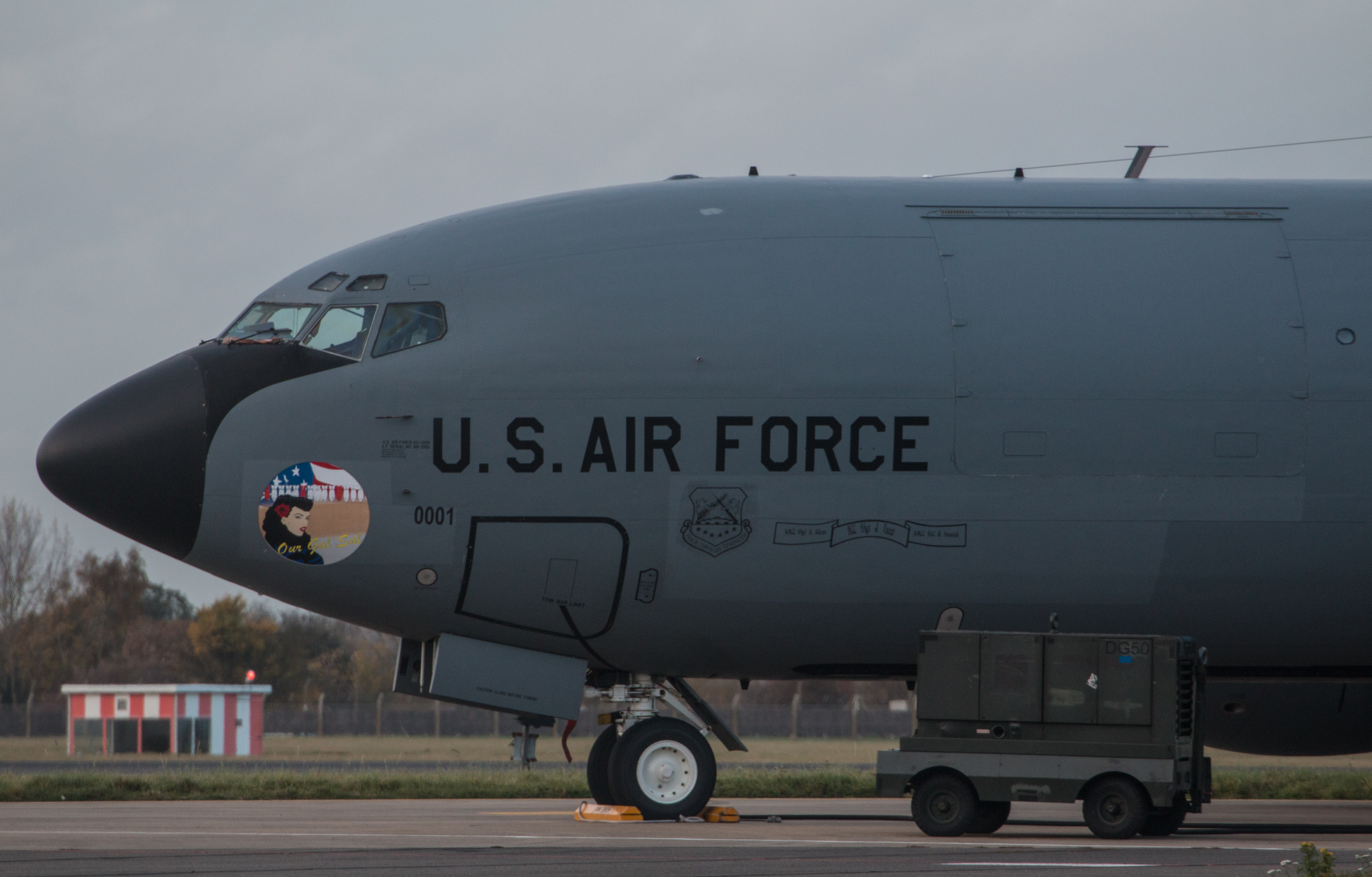
KC-135R Stratotanker (Note: Aircraft is Boeing KC-135R, serial 58-0001, Our Gal Sal in 2018, commemorating B-17G, serial 42-31767. Built as Boeing KC-135!-BN and earlier named Easy Rider.)

The 15 squadron KC-135R/T tankers typically wear nose art to reflect the 100th Wing's history as a bombardment group during WWII. (Note: Since 2023 this has included All American Girl (B-17G 42-37936) "42-37936". American Air Museum in Britain.; Big Gas Bird (B-17G, serial 42-30799' of the 349th Bombardment Squadron)"42-30799". American Air Museum in Britain.; Black Jack (B-17G, serial 42-30086)"Aircraft: 230086". 100th Bomb Group Foundation.; Boss Lady (B-17G, serial 42-102611 of the 350th Bombardment Squadron)"42-102611". American Air Museum in Britain.; High Life (B-17F, serial 42-30080)"42-30080". American Air Museum in Britain.; Holy Terror (B-17G, serial 42-31062)"42-31062". American Air Museum in Britain.; Homesick Angel; Hundred Proof (B-17G, serial 42-98015 of the 349th Bombardment Squadron)"Aircraft: 298015". 100th Bomb Group Foundation.; Miss Irish (B-17G, serial 42-31968 of the 350th Bombardment Squadron)"42-31968". American Air Museum in Britain.; Our Gal Sal (B-17G, erial 42-31767)"42-31767". American Air Museum in Britain.; Skipper III (B-17F, serial 42-3307 and B-17G, serial 42-31708 of the 351st Bombardment Squadron)"Aircraft: 23307". 100th Bomb Group Foundation."Aircraft: 231708". 100th Bomb Group Foundation.; Rosie's Riveters (B-17F, serial 42-30758 and B-17G, serial 42-31504 of the 418th Bombardment Squadron)"Aircraft: 230758". 100th Bomb Group Foundation."Aircraft: 231504". 100th Bomb Group Foundation.; Sly Fox (B-17F, serial 42-30278 of the 418th Bombardment Squadron)"42-30278". American Air Museum in Britain.; Squawkin Hawk (B-17F, serial 42-30088 of the 349th Bombardment Squadron)"42-30088 Squawkin Hawk II". American Air Museum in Britain.; The Jester (not associated); The Reluctant Dragon (B-17G, serial 43-38011 of the 349th Bombardment Squadron)"43-38011". American Air Museum in Britain.; The Savage (B-17G, serial 42-31710 of the 349th Bombardment Squadron)"42-31710". American Air Museum in Britain.; Wolff Pack (B-17F, serial '42-30061 of the 418th Bombardment Squadron)"42-30061". American Air Museum in Britain.)

In 2019, to mark the 75th anniversary of Operation Overlord, two KC-135Rs received special schemes to reflect the squadron's participation in 1944.

In May 2021, nose art (Skipper III) was unveiled on KC-135R, serial 59-1470 in honor of 100th BG Master Sergeant Dewey Christopher, who maintained B-17s Skipper and Skipper II during World War II. Another tanker (serial 58-0089) was unveiled the following month in dedication of Lt. Col. Robert "Rosie" Rosenthal, who was assigned to the 100th Group between September 1943 and September 1944.

In October 2023, nose art (Squawkin Hawk) was unveiled on KC-135R 59–1511 to commemorate the 80th anniversary of Black Week, where the Eighth Air Force suffered heavy losses. The original Squawkin Hawk was the first B-17 of the 100th Bombardment Group to fly 50 combat missions.

== Lineage ==
- Constituted as the 351st Bombardment Squadron (Heavy) on 28 January 1942

Activated on 1 June 1942
Redesignated 351st Bombardment Squadron, Heavy on 20 August 1943
Inactivated on 15 December 1945
Redesignated 351st Bombardment Squadron, Very Heavy on 3 July 1947
Activated in the reserve on 17 July 1947
Inactivated on 27 June 1949
Redesignated 351st Bombardment Squadron, Medium on 1 August 1955
Activated on 1 January 1956
Discontinued and inactivated on 25 June 1966
Redesignated 351st Air Refueling Squadron on 26 March 1992
Activated on 31 March 1992

=== Assignments ===
- 100th Bombardment Group, 1 June 1942 – 15 December 1945
- 100th Bombardment Group, 17 July 1947 – 27 June 1949
- 100th Bombardment Wing, 1 January 1956 – 25 June 1966
- 100th Operations Group, 31 March 1992 – present

=== Stations ===
- Orlando Army Air Base, Florida 1 June 1942
- Barksdale Field, Louisiana, 18 June 1942
- Pendleton Field, Oregon 26 June 1942
- Gowen Field, Idaho, 28 August 1942
- Walla Walla Army Air Field, Washington, 31 October 1942
- Wendover Field, Utah, 30 November 1942
- Sioux City Army Air Base, Iowa, 6 January 1943
- Kearney Army Air Field, Nebraska, 4 February – 1 May 1943
- RAF Thorpe Abbotts (Station 139), England, 9 June 1943 – December 1945
- Camp Kilmer, New Jersey, 14–15 December 1945
- Orlando Army Air Base (later Orlando Air Force Base), Florida, 17 July 1947 – 27 June 1949
- Portsmouth Air Force Base (later Pease Air Force Base), New Hampshire, 1 January 1956 – 30 April 1966
- RAF Mildenhall, England, 31 March 1992 – present

=== Aircraft ===
- Boeing B-17 Flying Fortress (1942–1945)
- Boeing B-47E Stratojet (1956–1966)
- Boeing KC-135R/T Stratotanker (1992–present)

=== Awards and campaigns ===
Award streamer	Award	Dates	Notes
	Distinguished Unit Citation	17 August 1943	Germany, 351st Bombardment Squadron
	Distinguished Unit Citation	4, 6, 8 March 1944	Berlin, Germany, 351st Bombardment Squadron
	Air Force Meritorious Unit Award	1 July–31 December 2016	351st Air Refueling Squadron
	Air Force Meritorious Unit Award	1 April–19 October 2021	351st Air Refueling Squadron
	Air Force Meritorious Unit Award	16 August–19 October 2021	351st Air Refueling Squadron
	Air Force Outstanding Unit Award	1 April 1993–31 July 1994	351st Air Refueling Squadron
	Air Force Outstanding Unit Award	1 August 1994–31 July 1995	351st Air Refueling Squadron
	Air Force Outstanding Unit Award	1 August 1995–31 July 1997	351st Air Refueling Squadron
	Air Force Outstanding Unit Award	24 March–10 June 1999	351st Air Refueling Squadron
	Air Force Outstanding Unit Award	11 June 1999–10 June 2001	351st Air Refueling Squadron
	Air Force Outstanding Unit Award	1 October 2003–30 September 2005	351st Air Refueling Squadron
	Air Force Outstanding Unit Award	1 October 2005–31 December 2006	351st Air Refueling Squadron
	Air Force Outstanding Unit Award	1 January 2019–31 December 2020	351st Air Refueling Squadron
	Air Force Outstanding Unit Award	1 August 2009–31 July 2010	351st Air Refueling Squadron
	Air Force Outstanding Unit Award	1 January 2020–31 December 2021	351st Air Refueling Squadron
	Air Force Outstanding Unit Award	1 January 2022–31 December 2023	351st Air Refueling Squadron
	French Croix de Guerre with Palm	25 June 1944 –31 December 1944	351st Bombardment Squadron

Campaign Streamer	Campaign	Dates	Notes
	Air Offensive, Europe	2 June 1943 – 5 June 1944	351st Bombardment Squadron
	Air Combat, EAME Theater	2 June 1943 – 11 May 1945	351st Bombardment Squadron
	Normandy	6 June 1944 – 24 July 1944	351st Bombardment Squadron
	Northern France	25 July 1944 – 14 September 1944	351st Bombardment Squadron
	Rhineland	15 September 1944 – 21 March 1945	351st Bombardment Squadron
	Ardennes-Alsace	16 December 1944 – 25 January 1945	351st Bombardment Squadron
	Central Europe	22 March 1944 – 21 May 1945	351st Bombardment Squadron
	Cease Fire	12 April 1991–30 November 1995	351st Air Refueling Squadron
	Kosovo Air	24 March–10 June 1999	351st Air Refueling Squadron

==== Spaatz Trophy ====
The squadron has twice been awarded the General Carl A. Spaatz Trophy, which is given to the best USAF air refueling squadron. The first award to the squadron was made for 2013, and was the first time a unit based outside of the United States won the award. The second time the squadron won the award was for 2020.
