= 100th Air Refueling Wing =

US Air Force unit

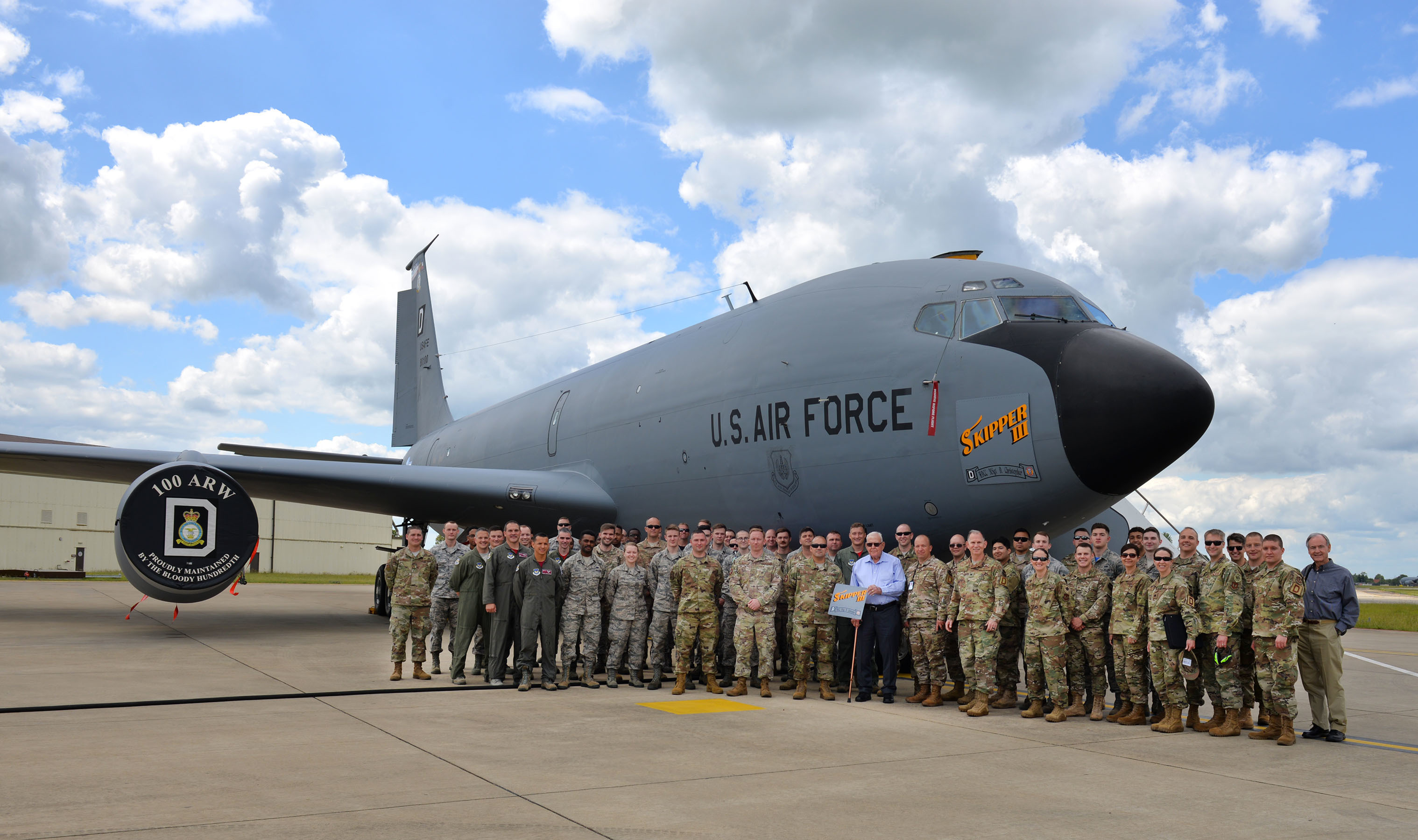
- Dedication of wing KC-135 as Skipper III to honor a former 351st Bombardment Squadron B-17
- Active: 1942–1945; 1947–1949; 1956–1983; 1990–1991; 1992 – present
- Country: United States
- Branch: United States Air Force
- Type: Operational wing
- Role: Air refueling
- Size: 15 aircraft
- Part of: US Air Forces in Europe – Air Forces Africa (Third Air Force)
- Base: RAF Mildenhall, United Kingdom
- Nickname: Bloody Hundredth
- Motto: Peace through strength
- Engagements: European Theater of Operations
- Decorations: Distinguished Unit Citation; Air Force Outstanding Unit Award with V Device; Air Force Outstanding Unit Award; French Croix de Guerre with Palm
- Website: Official website

Commanders
- Current commander: Colonel Steven Byrum
- Notable commanders: Darr H. Alkire

Insignia
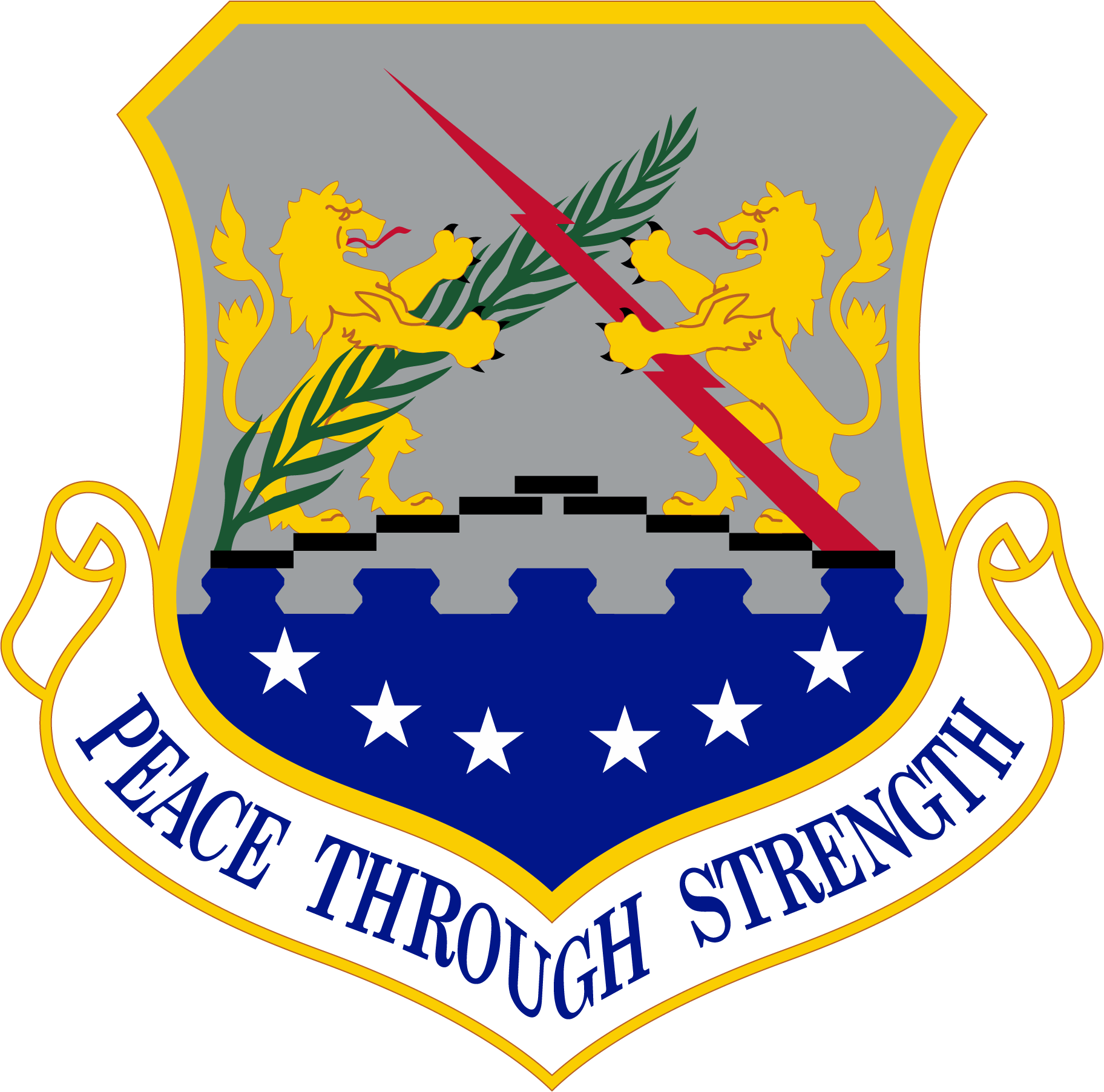
- 100th Air Refueling Wing emblem (Note: Approved 22 November 1957)

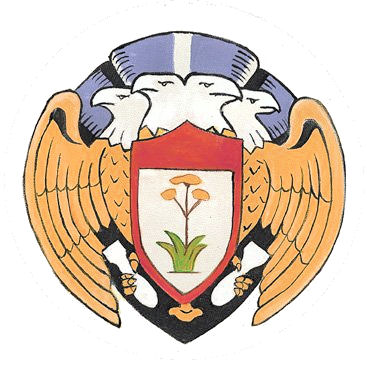
- 100th Bombardment Group emblem
- Tail code: D

Aircraft flown
- Tanker: KC-135R Stratotanker

The 100th Air Refueling Wing, nicknamed the Bloody Hundredth, is a United States Air Force unit assigned to the Third Air Force, United States Air Forces in Europe – Air Forces Africa. It is stationed at RAF Mildenhall, Suffolk, United Kingdom. It is also the host wing at RAF Mildenhall.

The 100th is the only permanent U.S. air refueling wing in the European theater, operating the Boeing KC-135R/T Stratotanker.

During World War II, its predecessor unit, the 100th Bombardment Group (Heavy) was an Eighth Air Force B-17 Flying Fortress unit in England, stationed at RAF Thorpe Abbotts. Flying over 300 combat missions, the group earned two Distinguished Unit Citations (Regensburg, 17 August 1943; Berlin, 4/6/8 March 1944). The group suffered tremendous losses in combat, with 177 aircraft missing in action, flying its last mission on 20 April 1945.

One of the wing's honors is that it is the only modern USAF operational wing allowed to display on its assigned aircraft the tail code (Square-D) of its World War II predecessor. (Note: The 379th Bombardment Wing used its Triangle-K tail code until inactivated in 1993, but when reactivated as the 379th Air Expeditionary Wing it was assigned a rotating mix of flying squadrons who used their parent unit's tail code. The Triangle-K is retained as an unofficial unit insignia.)

== Units ==
USAFE's only Boeing KC-135R/T air refueling wing, it is responsible for U.S. aerial refueling operations conducted throughout the European theater. The unit supports some 16,000 personnel, including Third Air Force, four geographically separated units, and 15 associated units.

100th Operations Group (100th OG)

- 351st Air Refueling Squadron (351st ARS)
- 100th Operations Support Squadron (100th OSS)

100th Maintenance Group (100th MXG)

- 100th Aircraft Maintenance Squadron (100th AMXS)
- 100th Maintenance Squadron (100th MXS)
- 100th Maintenance Operations Flight (100th MOF)

100th Mission Support Group (100th MSG)

- 100th Civil Engineer Squadron (100th CES)
- 100th Communications Squadron (100th CS)
- 100th Logistics Readiness Squadron (100th LRS)
- 100th Security Forces Squadron (100th SFS)
- 100th Force Support Squadron (100th FSS)

== History ==
=== World War II ===
On 1 June 1942, the Army Air Forces activated the 100th Bombardment Group (Heavy) and assigned it to III Bomber Command. The group remained unmanned until 27 October 1942, when a cadre for the unit was transferred from the 29th Bombardment Group to Gowen Field, Idaho. Within four days, on 1 November, the cadre moved to Walla Walla Army Air Base, Washington, where it received its first four aircrews and four B-17Fs from the Boeing factory in Seattle. Following this, the 100th relocated to Wendover Field, Utah, on 30 November where it added additional personnel, aircraft, and crews, and began bombing, gunnery, and navigation training.

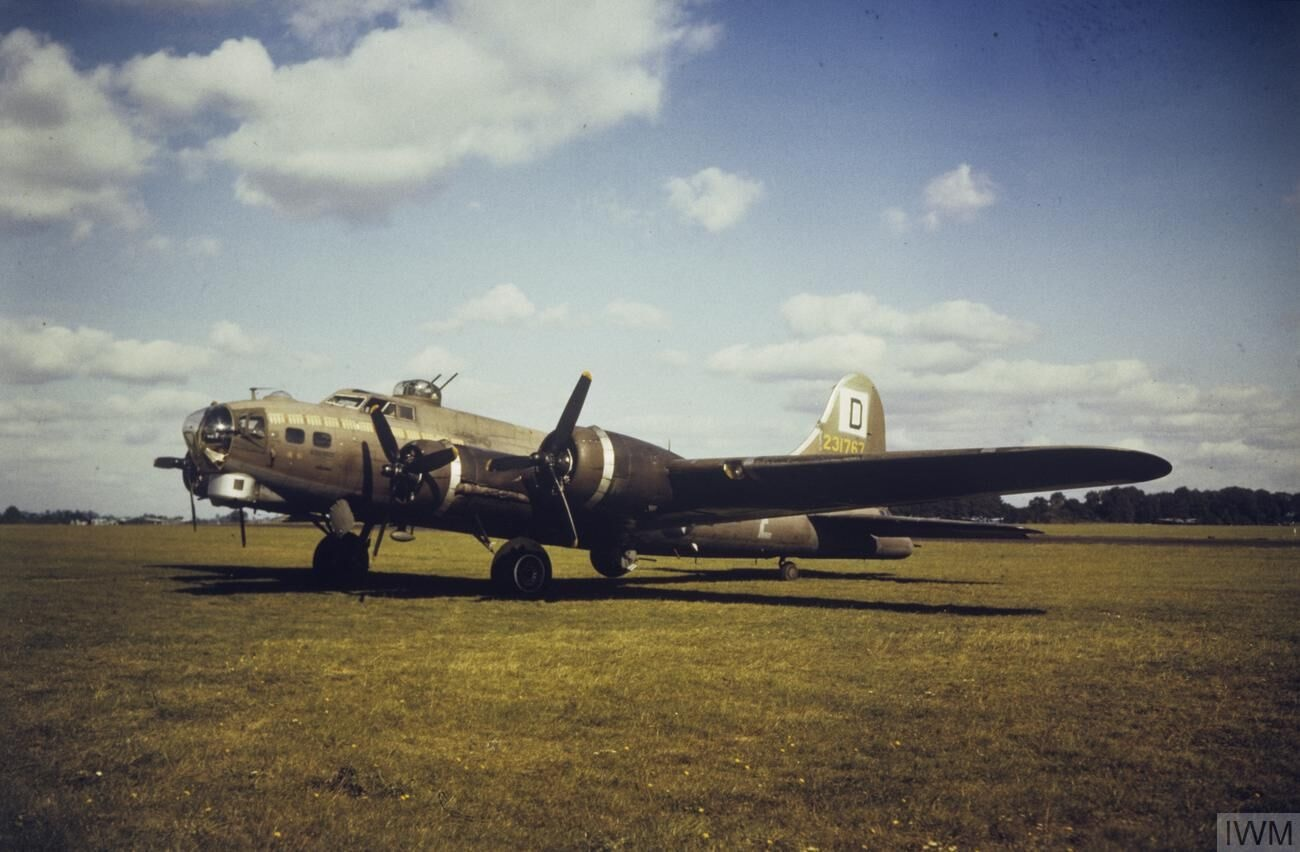
A 100th Bombardment Group B-17 Flying Fortress (Note: Aircraft is Boeing B-17 Flying Fortress, serial 42-31767, Our Gal Sal, EP-E at RAF Mount Farm c. 1942-1945.)

On New Year's Day, 1943, members of the fledgling group again transferred operations, this time to two bases. The aircraft and aircrews moved to Sioux City Army Air Base, Iowa, while the ground echelon went to Kearney Army Air Field, Nebraska. In both instances, members of the 100th assisted in air and ground training for other groups bound for overseas. In mid-April, the aircrew joined the ground echelon at Kearney and received new B-17s. After additional training, the group's aircrews departed Kearney on 25 May 1943, flying the North Atlantic route to England and into the war in Europe. Prior to the departure of aircraft and aircrews from Kearney, the 100th BG's ground echelon departed for the East Coast on 2 May 1943. On 27 May 1943, the ground personnel set sail aboard the RMS Queen Elizabeth bound for Podington, England, from New York. At Podington the ground crews rendezvoused with the air echelon, and together moved to RAF Thorpe Abbotts, Norfolk, where they remained throughout World War II, operating as a strategic bombardment organization.

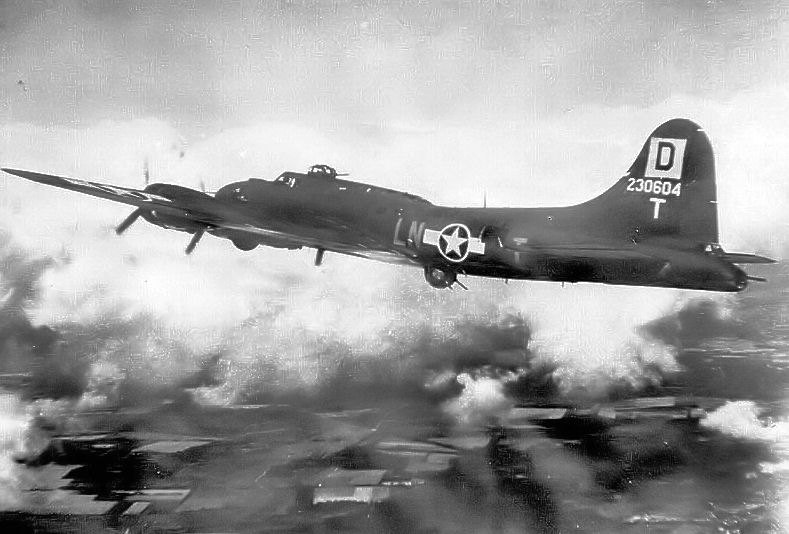
350th Bombardment Squadron B-17 Badger's Beauty V (Note: This plane crash landed in Normandy near Villers, France 4 October 1943. All crew survived)

On 25 June 1943, the 100th BG flew its first Eighth Air Force combat mission, bombing the U-boat yards at Bremen – the beginning of the "Bloody Hundredth"'s legacy. The group focused its bombing attacks against German airfields, industrial plants, and naval facilities in France, Germany, Poland, the Netherlands, Norway, Romania, and Soviet Union. The group inherited the "Bloody Hundredth" nickname from other bomb groups due to severe losses it took on several missions during summer and fall 1943. During one such raid on Münster on 10 October 1943, eighteen 100th BG aircraft were sent, of which five aborted and turned back before reaching the target. Twelve of the 13 aircraft that reached Münster were shot down; the only surviving 100th BG B-17 to reach Münster and return was the Royal Flush (Note: Boeing B-17F-45-VE Flying Fortress, serial 42-6087.) commanded for this mission by Robert Rosenthal; it returned to base seriously damaged and with several crewmen wounded. Only four of the original thirty-eight co-pilots assigned to the group completed their assigned twenty-five mission tour.

In August 1943, the group received its first Distinguished Unit Citation (DUC) after attacking the German aircraft factory at Regensburg (Note: The group was one of seven bomb groups of the 3rd Bombardment Wing attacking the city.) on 17 August 1943, resulting in serious disruption to German fighter production. From January–May 1944, the 100th Goup regularly bombed airfields, industries, marshaling yards, and V-weapon sites in Western Europe. In February 1944, the group participated in Operation Argument ("Big Week"), the Allied attempt to force a decisive battle with the Luftwaffe and gain air superiority over Western Europe before the invasion of France. In March 1944, the group completed a succession of attacks on Berlin and received its second DUC of the war. March 6, 1944 became known as “Black Monday”, due to 15 aircraft were shot down, meaning 150 men were lost and hundreds were wounded.

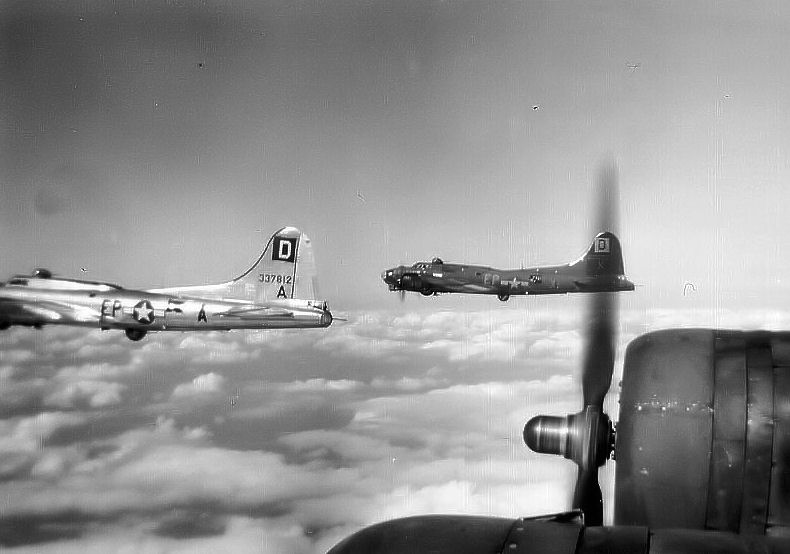
Boeing B-17G Fortresses of 351st BS

While bombing during the Oil Campaign of World War II as the summer of 1944 approached, the group also conducted interdictory missions, such as the June bombing of bridges and gun positions in support of the Invasion of Normandy. The next month saw aircrews bomb enemy positions at Saint-Lô, followed by similar attacks at Brest in August and September. In October 1944, the 100th BG attacked enemy defenses in the Allied drive on the Siegfried Line, then bombed marshaling yards, German occupied villages, and communication targets in the Ardennes during the Battle of the Bulge from December 1944 to January 1945. For its extraordinary efforts in attacking heavily defended German installations in Germany and dropping supplies to the French Forces of the Interior from June through December 1944, the 100th received the French Croix de Guerre with Palm.

The group flew its last combat mission of World War II on 20 April 1945. The following month the unit's aircrews dropped food to the people in the west of the Netherlands, and in June transported French Allied former prisoners of war from Austria to France. In December 1945, the group returned to the U.S., where it inactivated at Camp Kilmer, New Jersey, on 21 December 1945.

=== Cold War ===
On 29 May 1947, Headquarters Army Air Forces reactivated the 100th at Miami Army Air Field. From the time of its activation, the group trained and operated as a reserve unit assigned to the 49th Bombardment Wing (Later 49th Air Division). It is not clear whether or not the unit was fully manned or equipped. It was inactivated on 27 June 1949 due to budget reductions.

==== 100th Bombardment Wing ====
The 100th Bombardment Wing, Medium was established on 23 March 1953, but the wing was not activated as part of Strategic Air Command (SAC) until 1 January 1956. The delay was due to construction at the unit's programmed base, Portsmouth Air Force Base (later renamed Pease Air Force Base), New Hampshire. Construction was completed in late 1955 and, when activated, the 100th BW was assigned to the Eighth Air Force 817th Air Division.

The 100th Bomb Wing was assigned the new Boeing B-47E Stratojet swept-wing medium bombers in 1954, capable of flying at high subsonic speeds and primarily designed for penetrating the airspace of the Soviet Union. The 100th Bomb Wing operated from Pease AFB for ten years. In official parlance, the establishment "...performed global strategic bombardment training and air refueling missions." One of the most significant overseas temporary duty assignments took place during the first four months of 1958, when the 100th participated in the last full wing B-47 deployment. During this time, the B-47s from New Hampshire operated from RAF Brize Norton, in the United Kingdom. Subsequently, overseas deployments involved the simultaneous participation of several bomb wings engaging in global strategic bombardment training and global air refueling with the Stratojet.

In the early 1960s, the B-47 was considered to be reaching obsolescence and was being phased out of SAC's strategic arsenal. In October 1965, the Air Force initiated Project Fast Fly to oversee the inactivation of the last five B-47 wings and supporting tanker squadrons. The 100th ARS retired its last tanker on 21 December 1965, when aircraft 53-0282 flew to the Military Aircraft Storage and Disposition Center at Davis-Monthan Air Force Base, Arizona. The following day, the 100th Air Refueling Squadron inactivated. The wing retained its ground alert commitment at Pease until 31 December 1965 and inactivated on 25 June 1966.

==== 100th Strategic Reconnaissance Wing ====
Headquarters SAC received authority from Headquarters USAF to discontinue its Major Command controlled (MAJCOM) wings that were equipped with combat aircraft and to activate Air Force controlled (AFCON) units, most of which were inactive at the time, which could carry a lineage and history. On 11 February 1966, the 100th Strategic Reconnaissance Wing assumed the mission, equipment and personnel of the 4080th Strategic Reconnaissance Wing. The 349th Strategic Reconnaissance Squadron took over the Lockheed U-2 aircraft of the 4028th Strategic Reconnaissance Squadron and the 350th Strategic Reconnaissance Squadron took over the Ryan BQM-34 Firebee reconnaissance drones and Lockheed DC-130 launch aircraft of the 4025th Strategic Reconnaissance Squadron. The 4080th was a SAC MAJCOM wing, and its lineage terminated when it was discontinued and could not be continued by reactivation at a later date. The 100th was now at Davis-Monthan Air Force Base in Tucson, Arizona.

After its reactivation, the 100th performed strategic reconnaissance with the Lockheed U-2 and drone aircraft. On 11 July 1970, the force was moved from Bien Hoa to U-Tapao Royal Thai Naval Airfield (OL-RU) and then turned to (OL-UA in Nov. 1970) Thailand. Then after the move, in November 1972 they reactivated the 99th Strategic Reconnaissance Squadron. In January 1973, the U-2s of the 99th flew more than 500 combat hours. That was the first time any U-2 unit flew 500 hours in a single month. That was topped in December 1974 when they logged more than 600 hours. The 99th deployed to forward operating locations as needed, earning the P.T. Cullen Award as the reconnaissance unit that contributed most to the photo and signal intelligence efforts of SAC in 1972. The U-2s were one of the last units to be pulled out of Thailand in March 1976,

With the end of United States combat operations in Southeast Asia in mid-1973, the Air Force formally transferred nuclear air sampling operations to the 100th, and the 349th converted its U-2s to the U-2R configuration for atmospheric sampling missions, replacing the WB-57s which it inherited from the 4028th SRS. The air sampling mission would be moved to Osan Air Base, South Korea, although the deployment of U-2Rs to Osan could not take place until overflight and basing arrangements were concluded with the governments of Japan and the Republic of Korea and hangar facilities made ready at Osan. Not until the Communist Chinese had actually exploded their sixteenth nuclear device on 17 June 1974, could Headquarters USAF announce that all negotiations were concluded. At the same time, it directed Headquarters SAC to deploy the 349th "Olympic Race" assets to Osan and begin collecting from that location on 18 June 1974. The sampling mission continued at Osan, and the U-2s in South Korea became the 100th SRW OL-A.

In addition to the drone and air sampling missions, the wing performed worldwide surveillance missions like the monitoring of the ceasefire between the Israelis and the Egyptians following the 1973 Yom Kippur War. This operation was operated from RAF Akrotiri, Cyprus and was named operation Olive Harvest – Operating Location OL-OH.

A detachment also operated from McCoy Air Force Base, Florida until that installation's closure in 1975, followed by a move to nearby Patrick Air Force Base, Florida, designated Operating Location LF. These U-2s engaged in Olympic Fire missions over Cuba, which were coordinated with the Joint Air Reconnaissance Control Center at NAS Key West, Florida.

==== 100th Air Refueling Wing ====
In 1976, due to budget reductions, SAC consolidated its strategic reconnaissance assets. The 99th Strategic Reconnaissance Squadron and its U-2s were returned from U-Tapao and assigned to the 9th Strategic Reconnaissance Wing on 1 July 1976. The 9th Wing already controlled the 1st Strategic Reconnaissance Squadron, which operated the SR-71 Blackbird. This brought all the U-2 and SR-71 assets of SAC under one wing at Beale Air Force Base, California, with the RC-135 assets assigned to the 6th Strategic Wing at Eielson Air Force Base or the 55th Strategic Reconnaissance Wing at Offut Air Force Base (which also operated the Looking Glass platforms and EC-130 aircraft). The 544th Intelligence Wing at Bolling Air Force Base provided analysis support for intelligence collected by the flying wings. The Air Force continued to have non-SAC Strategic Reconnaissance assets in the form of satellite and radar systems operated by Aerospace Defense Command, which were later transferred to SAC in 1979, the National Reconnaissance Office, and the Space and Missiles Systems Organization|Space Systems Command in Air Force Systems Command. Cryptographic and communications intelligence operations were the domain of the Air Force Security Service|Air Force Intelligence, Surveillance and Reconnaissance Agency.

The U-2Rs of the 349th and the AQM-34 Firebee/DC-130 Hercules drone operations of the 350th Squadron were discontinued, with the squadrons becoming KC-135 tanker squadrons of the 100th Air Refueling Wing in support of the 9th Strategic Reconnaissance Wing SR-71 Blackbird. The U-2Rs in South Korea became the 9th Strategic Reconnaissance Wing Detachment 2. The AQM-34s, associated DC-130 Hercules launch aircraft and CH-3 Jolly Green Giant recovery helicopters were reassigned to the Tactical Air Command's 22d Tactical Drone Squadron and remained at Davis-Monthan.

With the redesignation, the 100th and its 349th and 350th Air Refueling Squadrons were moved administratively to Beale, taking over the assets of the 17th Bombardment Wing which was inactivated. The 349th and 350th assumed the KC-135s of the 903rd and 922d Air Refueling Squadrons. With the redesignation, the 100th assumed responsibility for providing worldwide air refueling support for the 9th Wing's SR-71s and U-2s on 30 September 1976

The 100th was inactivated on 15 March 1983 when its two KC-135 squadrons were reassigned to the host 9th Strategic Reconnaissance Wing at Beale, which became a composite wing under the one-base, one-wing concept.

=== Post-Cold War ===
After an inactive status for over seven years, SAC again reactivated the 100th, but this time as the 100th Air Division at Whiteman Air Force Base, Missouri on 1 July 1990, an intermediate command echelon of Strategic Air Command. It assumed host unit responsibilities at Whiteman. In addition, the division controlled the 509th Bombardment Wing, a former FB-111 unit that had relocated from the former Pease Air Force Base due to Base Realignment and Closure Commission action and which was not operational while waiting for production B-2 Spirit stealth bombers to arrive and appropriate facilities for the B-2s to be constructed. It also controlled the 351st Missile Wing, an LGM-30F Minuteman II intercontinental ballistic missile wing at Whiteman.

Air Force reorganization in 1991 put the 351st under the reactivated Twentieth Air Force on 29 March 1991, and the 509th Bomb Wing took over host duties at Whiteman. As a result, SAC inactivated the 100th again on 1 August 1991.

=== Air Refueling in Europe ===
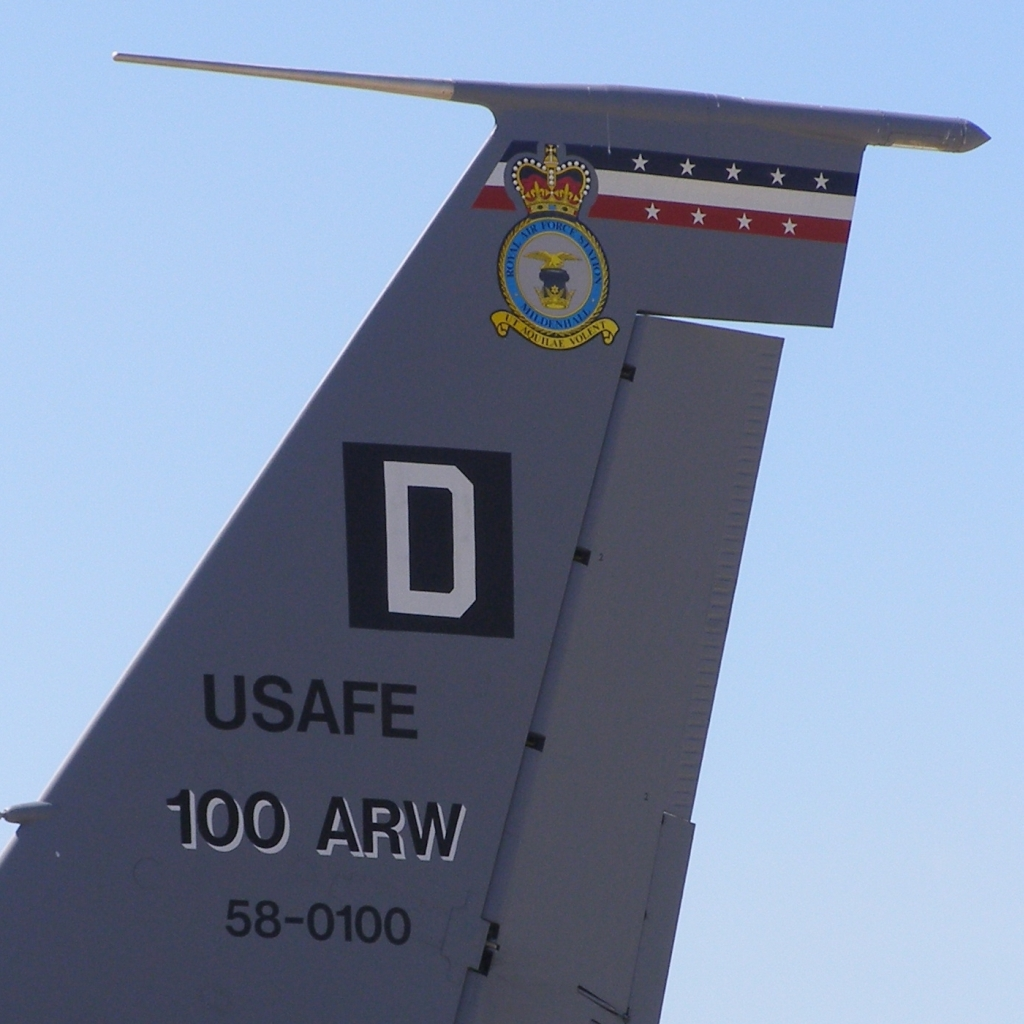
Tail of a wing Boeing KC-135R-BN Stratotanker (Note: Displaying the crest of RAF Mildenhall and the historic "Square D" badge as used by the unit on B-17 aircraft during World War II.)

Six months after its inactivation as an air division, and over 46 years after departing England at the end of World War II, the Air Force activated the 100th Air Refueling Wing, stationed at RAF Mildenhall, United Kingdom, on 1 February 1992. It was assigned to SAC, Fifteenth Air Force, 14th Air Division. It was then reassigned to Third Air Force on 1 February 1992. Becoming the host wing at RAF Mildenhall, the 100th ARW took over the management of the European Tanker Task Force (ETTF).

On 31 March 1992, the 351st Air Refueling Squadron was activated and assigned to the 100th Operations Group. The 100th received its first aircraft when KC-135R, serial 58-0100 arrived from Loring Air Force Base, Maine, in May 1992. The wing reached full strength by September 1992, when its ninth KC-135R was delivered.

The ETTF was ended on 28 November 1998, seeing the number of KC-135R/Ts assigned to the Bloody Hundredth increased to 15 tankers.

Since its reactivation in 1992, the 100th has served as the lone air refueling wing of the United States Air Forces in Europe.

The last surviving World War II pilot from the 100th Bombardment Group, John "Lucky" Luckadoo, died on 1 September 2025 at age 103.

== Lineage ==
100th Bombardment Group

- Established as 100th Bombardment Group (Heavy) on 28 January 1942.

Activated on 1 June 1942.
Redesignated 100th Bombardment Group, Heavy on 20 August 1943
Inactivated on 21 December 1945.
Redesignated 100th Bombardment Group, Very Heavy on 13 May 1947.
Activated in the Reserve on 29 May 1947.
Inactivated on 27 June 1949
Consolidated with the 100th Air Refueling Wing on 31 January 1984 (remained inactive)

100th Air Refueling Wing

- Constituted as 100th Bombardment Wing, Medium on 23 March 1953.

Activated on 1 January 1956.
Inactivated on 30 April 1966
Redesignated 100th Strategic Reconnaissance Wing on 25 June 1966
Redesignated 100th Air Refueling Wing, Heavy on 30 September 1976
Inactivated on 15 March 1983
Consolidated with the 100th Bombardment Group on 31 January 1984 (remained inactive)
Redesignated 100th Air Division on 15 June 1990
Activated on 1 July 1990
Inactivated on 26 July 1991
Redesignated 100th Air Refueling Wing and activated on 1 February 1992 (Note: when the wing is the main force provider, it forms the 100th Air Expeditionary Wing when supporting Operation Allied Force effective 24 March 1999.)

=== Assignments ===
- III Bomber Command, 1 June 1942
- Second Air Force, 18 June 1942
- II Bomber Command, 26 June 1942
- 15th Bombardment Wing (later 15th Bombardment TrainingWing, 15th Bombardment Operational Training Wing), 30 November 1942
- Eighth Air Force, c. 2 June 1943
- VIII Bomber Command, c. 4 June 1943
- 4th Bombardment Wing, 6 June 1943 (attached to 402d Provisional Combat Bombardment Wing after 6 June 1943)
- 3d Bombardment Division, 13 September 1943
- 13th Combat Bombardment Wing (Heavy), 14 September 1943
- 3d Air Division, 18 June 1945
- 1st Air Division, 12 August 1945
- 3d Air Division, 28 September 1945
- VIII Fighter Command, 1 November–December 1945
- 49th Bombardment Wing (later 49 Air Division), 29 May 1947 – 27 June 1949
- Eighth Air Force, 1 January 1956
- 817th Air Division, 1 February 1956 – 30 April 1966 (attached to 7th Air Division, 29 December 1957 – 1 April 1958)
- 12th Strategic Aerospace Division, 25 June 1966
- 14th Strategic Aerospace Division, 30 June 1971
- 12th Strategic Missile Division (later 12 Air Division), 1 August 1972
- 14th Air Division, 30 September 1976 – 15 March 1983
- Eighth Air Force, 1 July 1990 – 26 July 1991
- Third Air Force, 1 February 1992 – present

== Components ==
Wings

- 351st Strategic Missile Wing: 1 July 1990 – 26 July 1991
- 509th Bombardment Wing: 30 September 1990 – 26 July 1991

Groups

- 100th Operations Group: 1 February 1992–present
- 100th Maintenance Group
- 100th Communications Group: 1992-1 July 1994.
- 100th Mission Support Group
- 100th Regional Support Group: 1 February 1992 – 1994. This group was responsible for base support across RAF Croughton, RAF Little Rissington, and potentially other stations. Succeeded by 603rd Regional Support Group, 1 July 1994.

Squadrons

- 9th Air Refueling Squadron: 30 September 1976 – 27 January 1982
- 99th Strategic Reconnaissance Squadron: 1 November 1972 – 30 June 1976
- 100th Air Refueling Squadron: 16 August 1956 – 25 June 1966
- 349th Bombardment Squadron (later 349th Strategic Reconnaissance Squadron, 349th Air Refueling Squadron): 1 June 1942 – 1 December 1945; 29 May 1947 – 27 June 1949; 1 January 1956 – 15 March 1983
- 350th Bombardment Squadron (later 350th Strategic Reconnaissance Squadron, 350th Air Refueling Squadron): 1 June 1942 – 15 December 1945; 16 July 1947 – 27 June 1949; 1 January 1956 – 1 July 1976 (detached 4 March-c. 4 April 1958); 28 January 1982 – 15 March 1983
- 351st Bombardment Squadron: 1 June 1942 – 15 December 1945; 17 July 1947 – 27 June 1949; 1 January 1956 – 25 June 1966
- 418th Bombardment Squadron: 1 June 1942 – 19 December 1945; 29 May 1947 – 27 June 1949; 1 March 1959 – 1 January 1962
- 509th Air Refueling Squadron: attached 8 April – 8 July 1958.

100 Air Expeditionary Wing Components

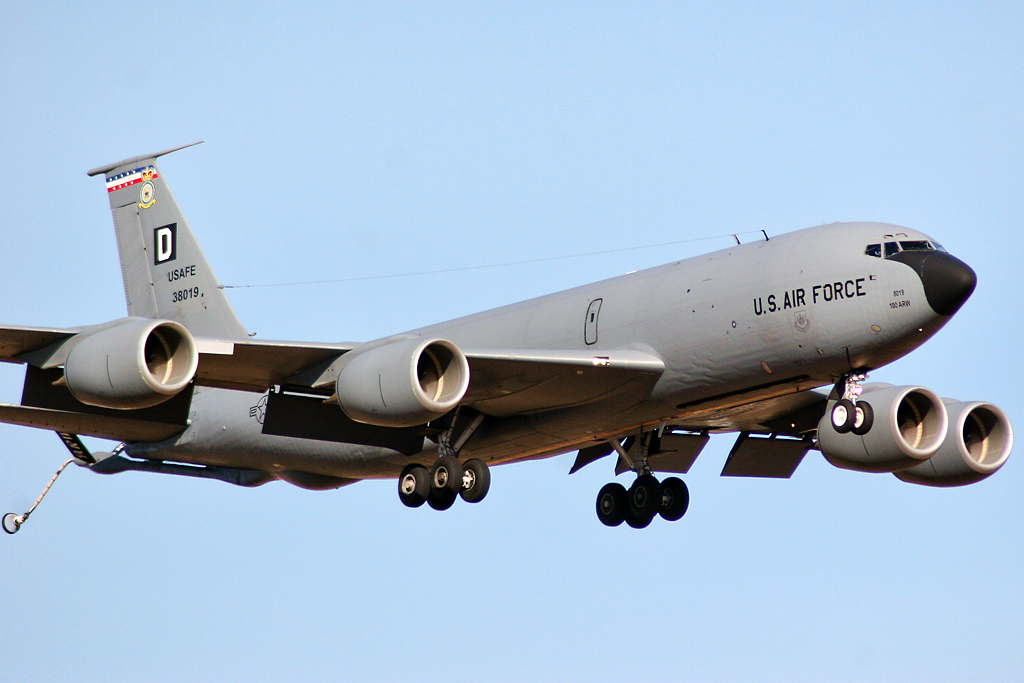
- A Boeing KC-135R Stratotanker of the 100th Air Refueling Wing
  100th Expeditionary Operations Group, RAF Mildenhall, England (34 KC-135)

100th Expeditionary Air Refueling Squadron, 9 April – 20 June 1999

- 100th Expeditionary Group, RAF Brize Norton, England (12 KC-135)

106th Expeditionary Air Refueling Squadron, 24 March 1999 – present

- 2d Air Expeditionary Group, RAF Fairford, England (5 KC-135)

22d Expeditionary Air Refueling Squadron, 24 March 1999 – present

== Stations ==
- Orlando Army Air Base, Florida 1 June 1942
- Barksdale Field, Louisiana, c. 18 June 1942
- Pendleton Field, Oregon c. 26 June 1942
- Gowen Field, Idaho, 28 August 1942
- Walla Walla Army Air field, Washington, c. 1 November 1942
- Wendover Field, Utah, c. 30 November 1942
- Sioux City Army Air Base, Iowa, c. 28 December 1942
- Kearney Army Air Field, Nebraska, c. 30 January – May 1943
- RAF Thorpe Abbotts (AAF-139), England, 9 June 1943 – December 1945
- Camp Kilmer, New Jersey, c. 20–21 December 1945
- Miami Army Air Field (later Miami International Airport), Florida, 29 May 1947 – 27 June 1949
- Portsmouth Air Force Baase (later Pease Air Force Base), New Hampshire, 1 January 1956 – 25 June 1966
- Davis-Monthan Air Force Base, Arizona, 25 June 1966 – 30 September 1976
- Beale Air Force Base, California, 30 September 1976 – 15 March 1983
- Whiteman Air Force Base, Missouri, 1 July 1990 – 26 July 1991
- RAF Mildenhall, United Kingdom, 1 February 1992 – present

== Aircraft/missiles assigned ==
- Boeing B-17 Flying Fortress, 1942–1945
- Boeing B-47 Stratojet, 1956–1966
- Boeing KC-97 Stratofreighter, 1956–1965
- Lockheed U-2, 1966–1976 (WU-2, 1966–1969)
- Lockheed DC-130, 1966–1976
- Boeing KC-135 Stratotanker, 1976–1983, 1992–present
- Minuteman II, 1990–1991

== Awards and decorations ==
- Air Force Outstanding Unit Award
- French Croix de Guerre with Palm
- Presidential Unit Citation

== In popular culture ==
Masters of the Air, a television miniseries for Apple TV+ from Steven Spielberg and Tom Hanks follows the events of the 100th Bomb Group during World War II.

== See also ==
- 100th Bomb Group Memorial Museum
- Home Front Heroes Day – day of recognition established by John "Lucky" Luckadoo, the last living original member of the 100th Bomb Group
- List of wings of the United States Air Force
- List of B-47 units of the United States Air Force
- United States Air Force in the United Kingdom

== Notes ==
Explanatory notes

Citations
