= 418 Squadron =

418 Squadron or 418th Squadron may refer to:

- 418 Search and Rescue Operational Training Squadron, Canada
- 418th Bombardment Squadron, United States
- 418th Flight Test Squadron, United States
- 418th Test and Evaluation Squadron, United States
