= 100th Bomb Group Memorial Museum =

Museum in Norfolk, UK

Coordinates: 52°23′10.572″N 001°12′45.32″E

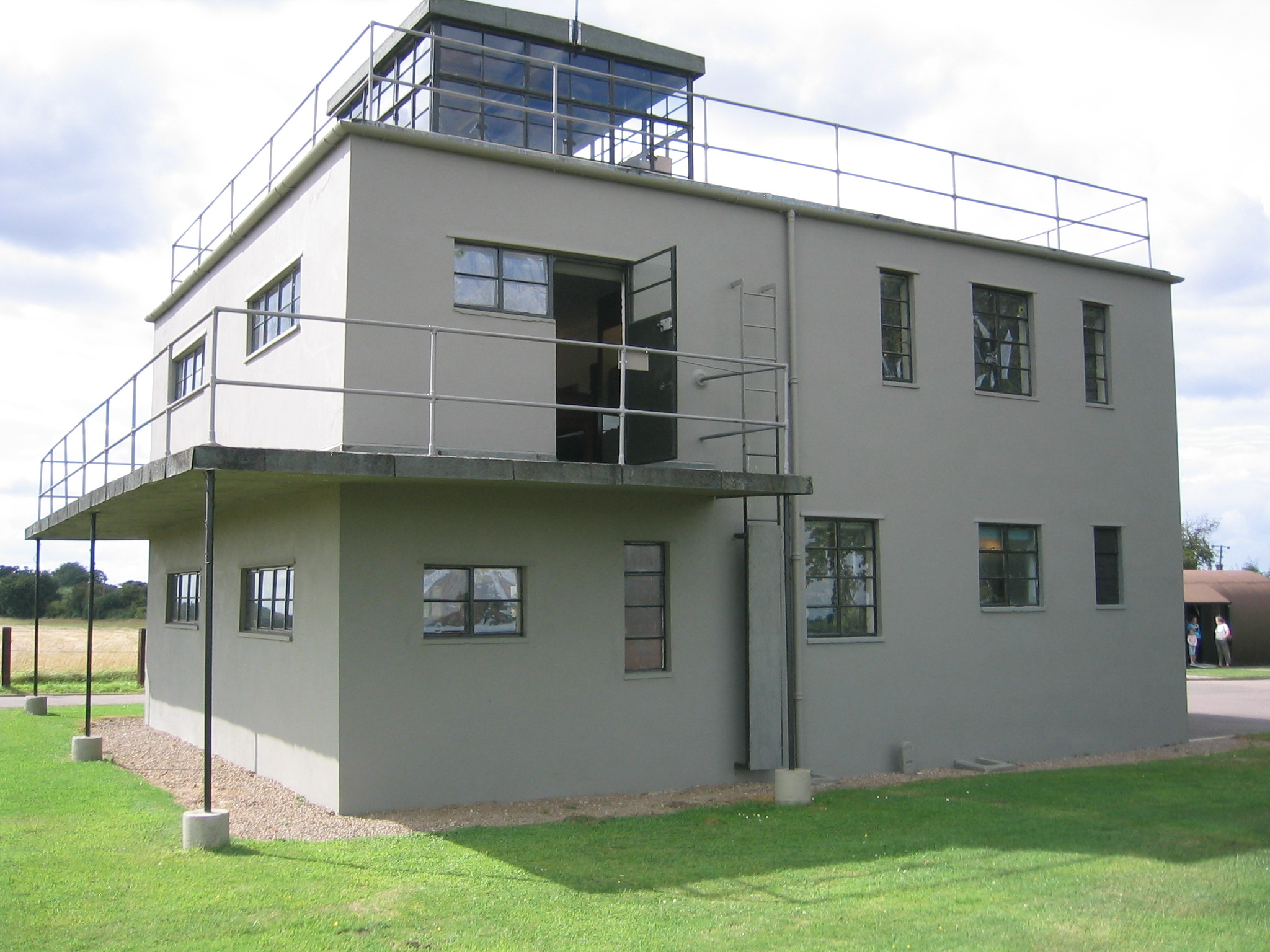
- The Control Tower now forms part the 100th Bomb Group Memorial Museum
- Location: Common Road, Dickleburgh, Diss, Norfolk, IP21 4PH,
- Website: 100th Bomb Group Memorial Museum

The 100th Bomb Group Memorial Museum, located in the original control tower and other remaining buildings of the RAF Thorpe Abbotts airfield east of Diss in Norfolk is named after the 100th Bomb Group and is dedicated to the American soldiers and members of the US 8th Air Force who fought with the Allies in Norfolk in World War II. The area also became known as the "Fields of Little America" due to the number of Americans stationed there.

The entire former control tower is now museum space that highlights documents, photographs, uniforms and service equipment, plus a recreation of the original teleprinter room. The museum's collection includes a number of maps and other war-related artefacts from World War II's effects on the soldiers stationed there and how the group eventually came to be called the "Bloody Hundredth".

The roof of the control tower is known as the glasshouse, from where the remaining airstrips are visible. It remains as it was when the airfield was operational with the addition of a model of the airbase in the 1940s.
