= Home Front Heroes Day =

Annual recognition day for wartime civilian efforts

Home Front Heroes Day is observed on May 9 to acknowledge and honor the contributions of individuals on the home front, past and present, for their support, work and sacrifices at home during the service of their family members, loved ones, and fellow Americans in the United States military.

== History ==
In 2019, World War II veteran John "Lucky" Luckadoo, then aged 97, announced his goal of establishing a national day of recognition, on May 9, for home front heroes. Luckadoo was a B-17 Flying Fortress pilot and was the last surviving original pilot of the 100th Bomb Group, also known as the Bloody Hundredth, part of the Eighth Air Force during World War II. He was the subject of the book Damn Lucky: One Man's Courage During the Bloodiest Military Campaign in Aviation History by Kevin Mauer. Luckadoo died on September 1, 2025, at age 103.

The first official recognition of the date of May 9 as Home Front Heroes Day was on May 9, 2019, in Dallas, Texas. The inaugural event was created for residents of Luckadoo's retirement community, Presbyterian Village North. Ceremonies included the presentation by Dallas City Council member Adam McGough of a proclamation from the Office of the Mayor/City of Dallas and the Dallas City Council.

On May 6, 2022, Congressman Colin Allred (D-TX-32) and Congressman Jake Ellzey (R-TX-06) introduced a bipartisan resolution supporting the effort to designate May 9 as Home Front Heroes Day.

== See also ==
- Victory in Europe Day
