= John Luckadoo =

American WWII bomber pilot (1922–2025)

John "Lucky" Luckadoo (1922–2025) was an American bomber pilot. He flew the B-17 Flying Fortress and was the last surviving original pilot of the 100th Bomb Group, also known as the Bloody Hundredth, part of the Eighth Air Force during World War II. He was the subject of the book Damn Lucky: One Man's Courage During the Bloodiest Military Campaign in Aviation History by Kevin Maurer.

In 2019, Luckadoo, then aged 97, announced his goal of establishing a national day of recognition, on May 9, for home front heroes. The first official recognition of Home Front Heroes Day was on May 9, 2019, in Dallas, Texas.

Luckadoo died on September 1, 2025, at age 103.
