= RAF Thorpe Abbotts =

RAF air base in Norfolk, England

RAF Thorpe Abbotts USAAF Station 139
- Diss, Norfolk, England
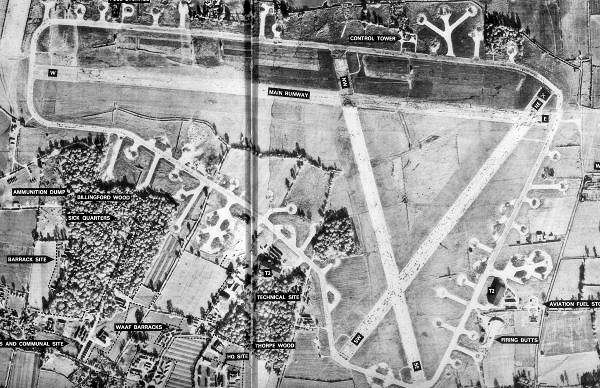
- Thorpe Abbots Airfield - 13 November 1946

Site information
- Type: Royal Air Force station
- Code: TA
- Owner: Air Ministry
- Operator: Royal Air Force; United States Army Air Forces
- Controlled by: Eighth Air Force

Location
- Location in Norfolk
- Coordinates: 52.38°N 1.22°E

Site history
- Built: 1942
- Built by: John Laing & Son Ltd.
- In use: 1943-1956
- Battles/wars: European Theatre of World War II; Air Offensive, Europe July 1942 - May 1945

Garrison information
- Garrison: 100th Bombardment Group

Airfield information
Runways
Direction	Length and surface
East/West 10/28	Concrete 6300ft
NNE/SSW 22/04	Concrete 4200ft
NNW/SSE 17/35	Concrete 4200ft

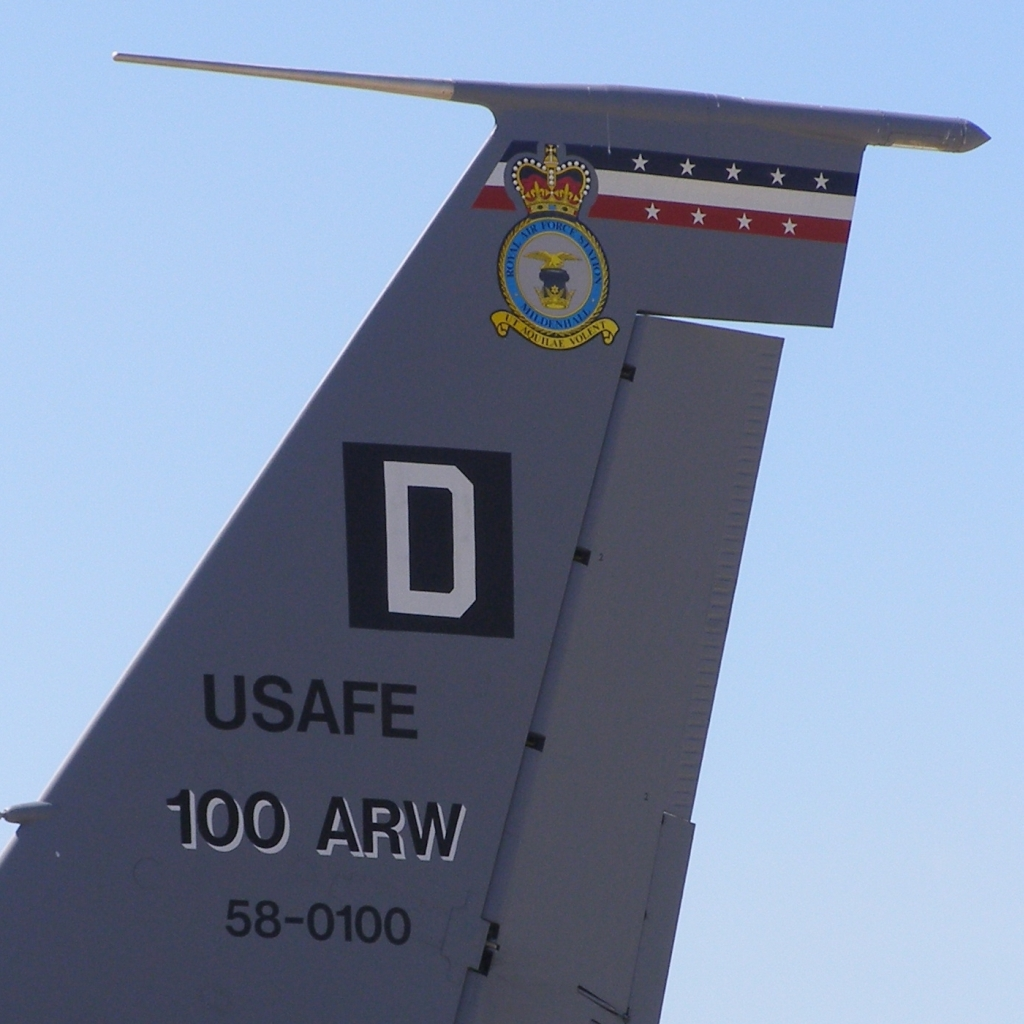
Tail of a 100 ARW Boeing KC-135R-BN Stratotanker, Serial 58-0100, displaying the crest of RAF Mildenhall and the historic "Square-D" badge as used by the unit during the second world war

Royal Air Force Thorpe Abbotts or more simply RAF Thorpe Abbotts is a former Royal Air Force station located 4 miles (6.4 km) east of Diss, Norfolk, in eastern England.

The station was built for the RAF use but handed over to the United States Army Air Forces in 1943 and upgraded for heavy bomber squadrons.

== Second World War ==
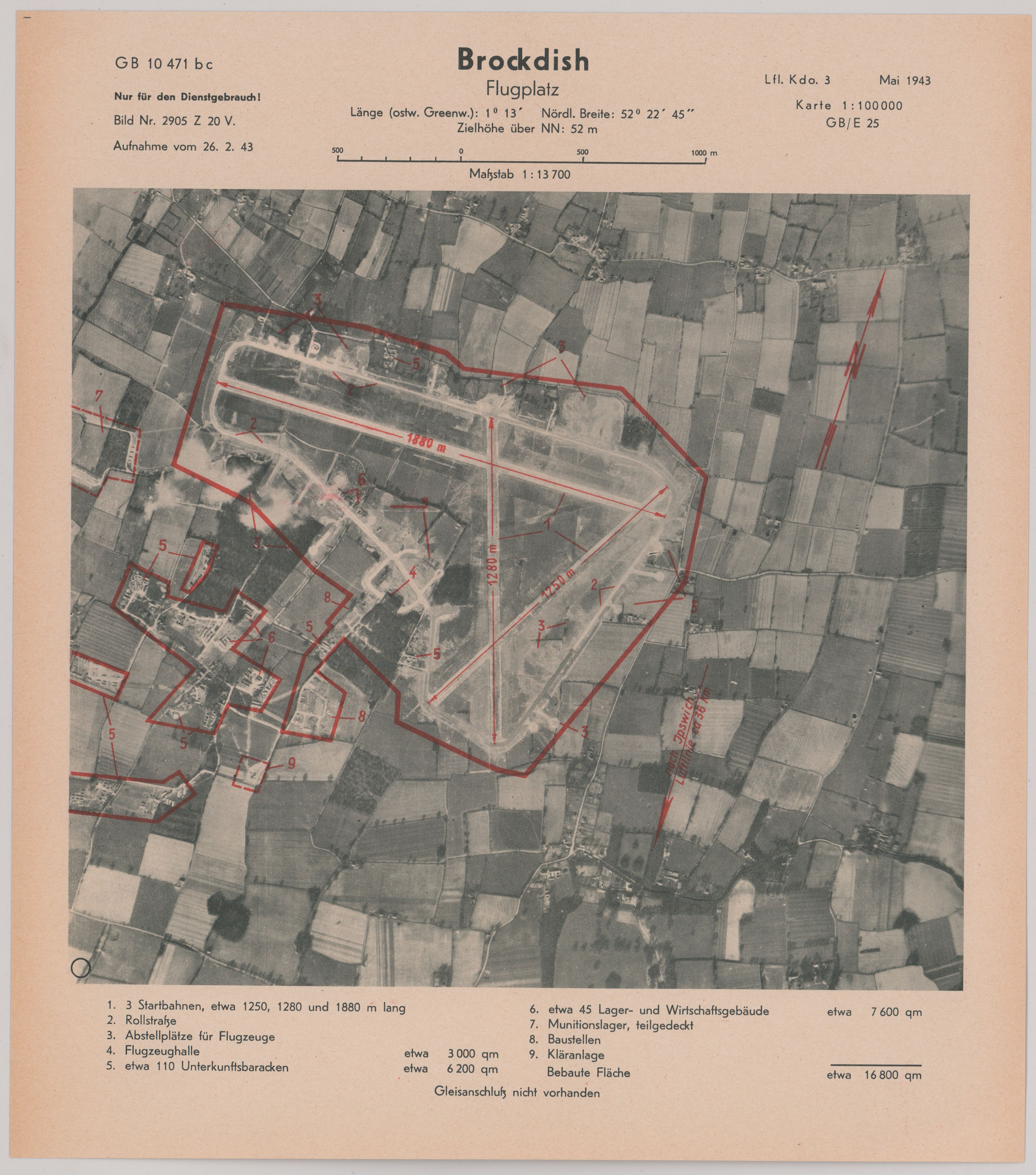
RAF Thorpe Abbotts on a target dossier of the German Luftwaffe, 1943

RAF Thorpe Abbotts was built during 1942 and early 1943 for the Royal Air Force (RAF) as a satellite airfield for RAF Horham but the rapid buildup of the Eighth Air Force resulted in both airfields being handed over to the United States Army Air Forces (USAAF). The thirty-six hardstandings originally planned were increased to fifty. Two T-2 hangars were erected, one on the east side of the flying field and one on the south side adjacent to the technical site. This and several of the domestic sites were in woodland stretching south and bordering the A143 Diss to Harleston road.

=== United States Army Air Forces use ===
Thorpe Abbotts was given USAAF designation Station 139, (TA).

==== 100th Bombardment Group (Heavy) ====
The 100th Bombardment Group (Heavy) arrived at Thorpe Abbotts on 9 June 1943, from Kearney AAF Nebraska. The 100th was assigned to the 13th Combat Bombardment Wing, and the group tail code was a "Square-D". Its operational squadrons were:

- 349th Bombardment Squadron (XR)
- 350th Bombardment Squadron (LN)
- 351st Bombardment Squadron (EP)
- 418th Bombardment Squadron (LD)

The group flew the Boeing B-17 Flying Fortress as part of the Eighth Air Force's strategic bombing campaign. In combat, the 100th operated chiefly as a strategic bombardment organization until the war ended. The group gained the nickname "The Bloody Hundredth" due to its heavy losses during eight missions to Germany when the group experienced several instances where it lost a dozen or more aircraft on a single mission, whereas most units suffered losses in consistent small amounts.

From June 1943 to January 1944, as part of the Combined Bomber Offensive the 100th Bomb Group concentrated its efforts against airfields in France and naval facilities and industries in France and Germany. The 100th BG received a Distinguished Unit Citation for seriously disrupting German fighter plane production with an attack on an aircraft factory at Regensburg as part of the Schweinfurt–Regensburg mission on 17 August 1943.

On 10 October 1943, the bomb raid that the 100th BG made on Münster, ended up with the only surviving 100th BG B-17 that went out on the raid, the Royal Flush (s/n 42-6087) commanded that day by Robert Rosenthal and flown by his regular crew, returning safely on just two working engines and both waist gunners seriously wounded, to Thorpe Abbotts.

Masters of the Air is a 2024 American war drama miniseries created by John Shiban and John Orloff for Apple TV+.[4] It is based on the 2007 book of the same name by Donald L. Miller and follows the actions of the 100th Bomb Group, a Boeing B-17 Flying Fortress heavy bomber unit in the Eighth Air Force in eastern England during World War II. Masters of the Air recounts the story of the 100th Bomb Group during World War II and follows bomber crews on dangerous missions to destroy targets inside German-occupied Europe, especially the doomed october 10th 1943 mission to Münster Germany, when only one B17 flown by lt Robert Rosenthal came back.

The Bloody 100th bombed airfields, industries, marshalling yards, and missile sites in western Europe, January – May 1944. Operations in this period included participation in the Allied campaign against enemy aircraft factories during "Big Week", 20 – 25 February 1944. The group completed a series of attacks against Berlin in March 1944 and received a second Distinguished Unit Citation for the missions.

Beginning in the summer of 1944, oil installations became major targets. In addition to strategic operations, the group engaged in support and interdictory missions, hitting bridges and gun positions in the transportation plan preparations for the invasion of Normandy in June 1944. The unit bombed enemy positions at Saint-Lô in July and at Brest in August and September Other missions were striking transportation and ground defences in the drive against the Siegfried Line, October – December 1944; attacking marshalling yards, defended villages, and communications in the Ardennes sector during the Battle of the Bulge, December 1944 – January 1945; and covering the airborne assault across the Rhine in March 1945.

The 100th Bomb Group received the French Croix de Guerre with Palm for attacking heavily defended installations in Germany and for dropping supplies to French Forces of the Interior, June – December 1944.

The 100 BG flew its last combat mission of World War II on 10 April 1945 which was number 306.

In December 1945, the group returned to Camp Kilmer, New Jersey. Group personnel were demobilized and the aircraft sent to storage. The unit was inactivated on 21 December 1945 and redesignated as the 100th Bombardment Group (Very Heavy).

== Postwar use ==
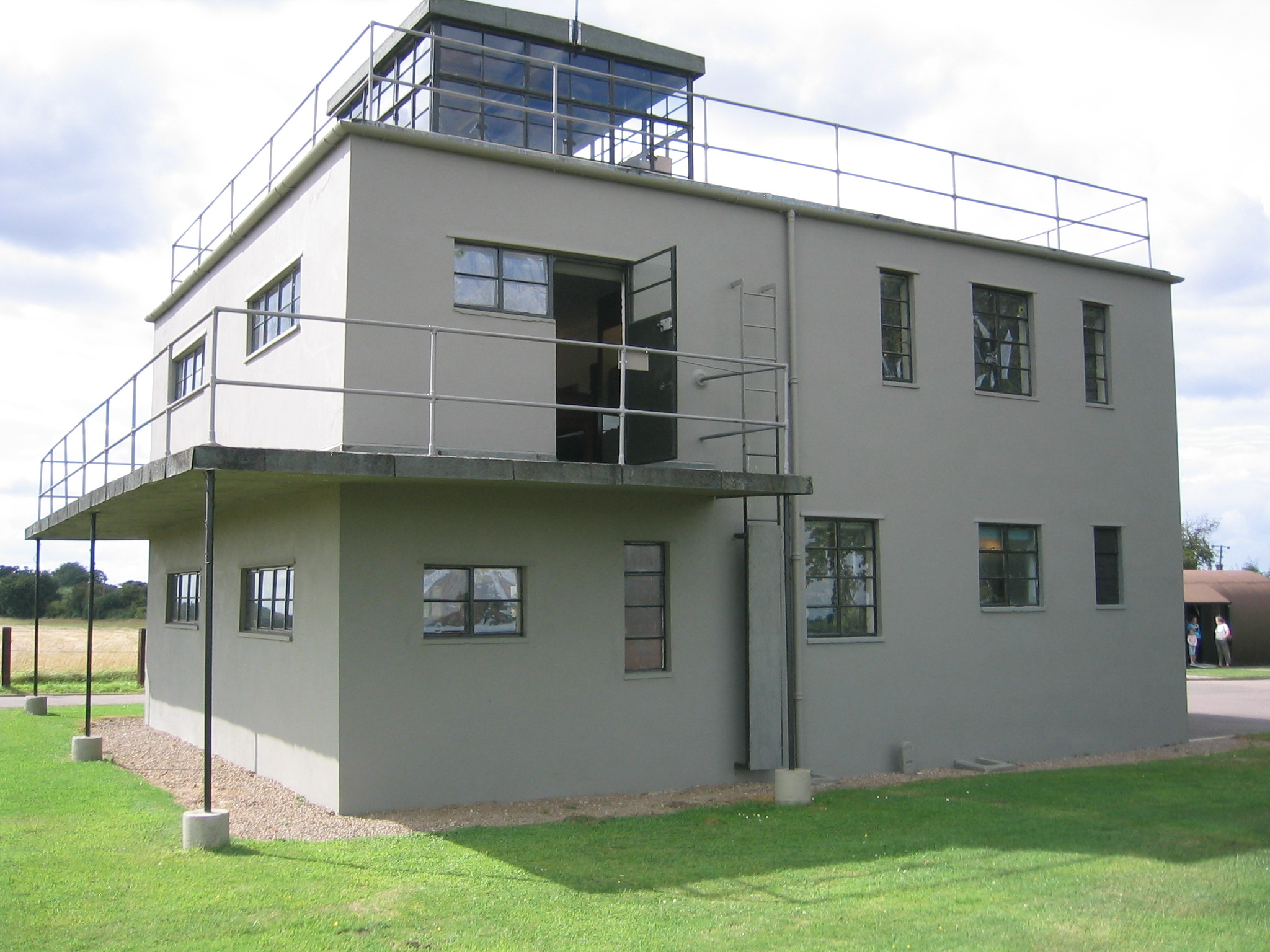
The Control Tower which now forms part of the 100th Bomb Group Memorial Museum

After the war, the airfield was transferred to the RAF on 27 June 1946. After many years of inactivity, Thorpe Abbotts was closed in 1956. With the end of military control, the airfield was largely returned to agricultural use with most of the perimeter track, runways and hardstands removed. A small airstrip was built on a part of the former perimeter track which is used for light aircraft. The control tower was restored in 1977 and was turned into the 100th Bomb Group Memorial Museum. Several World War II era buildings remain in various states of decay.

== See also ==
- List of former Royal Air Force stations
- 100th Bomb Group Memorial Museum
