= 418th Flight Test Squadron =

US Air Force squadron assigned to the AF Materiel Command

418th Flight Test Squadron

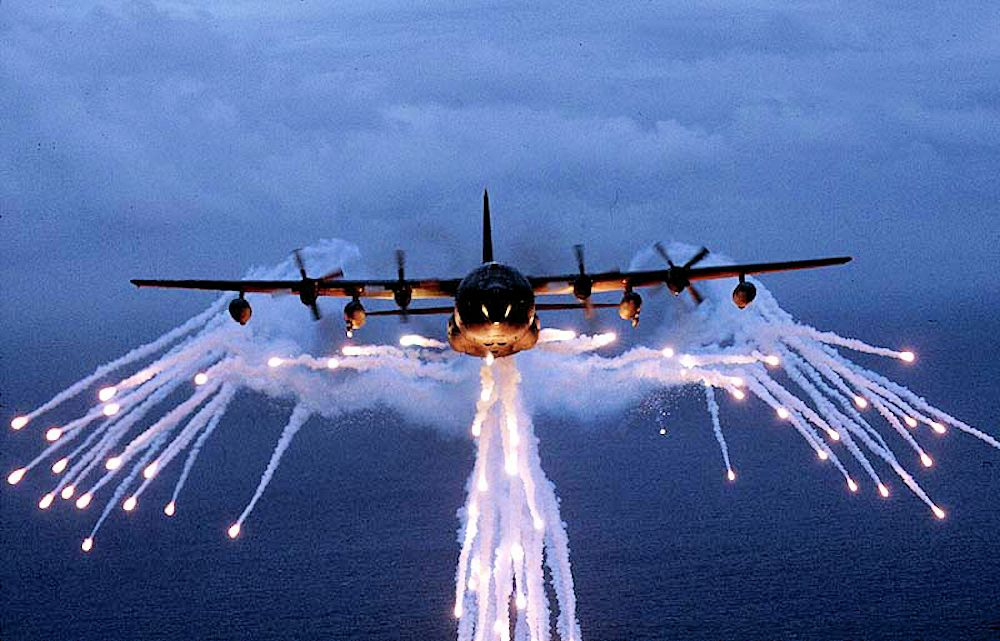
- 418th Flight Test Squadron MC-130 Combat Talon II
- Active: 1942–1945; 1947–1949; 1959–1962; 1989–present
- Country: United States
- Branch: United States Air Force
- Type: Squadron
- Role: Flight Testing
- Part of: Air Force Materiel Command
- Garrison/HQ: Edwards Air Force Base, California
- Engagements: European Theater of Operations
- Decorations: Distinguished Unit Citation; French Croix de Guerre with Palm

Insignia
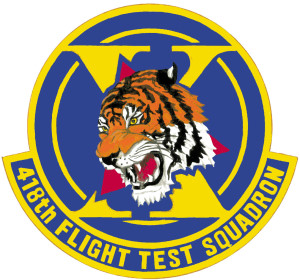
- 418th Flight Test Squadron emblem (Note: Approved 19 May 1994. Azure, an orle Or overall and throughout the cipher “X” of the like [color] surmounted by a triangle Gules upper point bendwise and [d]ebruised by a Bengal tiger head erased close proper, all within a diminished bordure Yellow.)

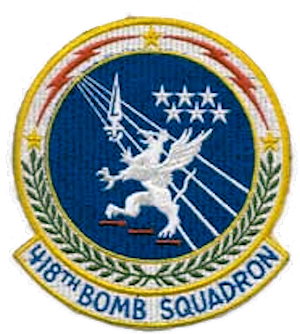
- 418th Bombardment Squadron emblem (Strategic Air Command) (Note: Approved 9 June 1961. Description: On an Air Force blue disc bordered white, the border edged Air Force golden yellow, fimbriated red, below six stars in formation fesswise, three and three, four contrails issuing from dexter chief, radiating to sinister base, surmounted by a griffin rampant brandishing a sword in his right claw, all white; the griffin poised on the upper and lower of three red steps; on the border two red lightning flashes arched between three Air Force golden yellow stars fimbriated red, one in chief, one in dexter and one in sinister, all above two green olive branches arched, one in dexter base and one in sinister base.)

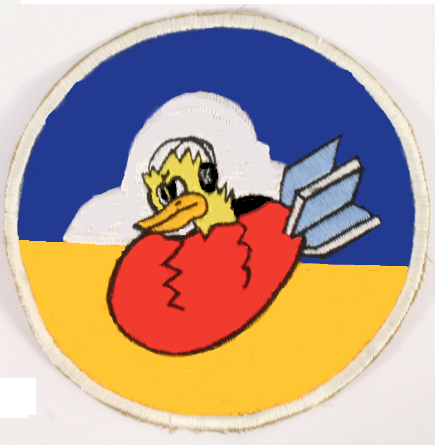
- 418th Bombardment Squadron emblem (World War II) (Note: Approved 4 October 1943.)
- World War II fuselage code: LD (USAAF)
- Tail code (1989-present): ED

Aircraft flown
- Transport: C-130 Hercules and special operations variants
- Tanker: KC-135 Stratotanker and special variants

The 418th Flight Test Squadron is a United States Air Force squadron. It is assigned to the 412th Operations Group, Air Force Materiel Command, stationed at Edwards Air Force Base, California.

The first predecessor of the squadron, the 418th Bombardment Squadron, was activated during World War II as a heavy bomber unit. It served in combat in the European Theater of Operations, where it earned a Distinguished Unit Citation and the French Croix de Guerre with Palm for its actions. After V-E Day the squadron returned to the United States and was inactivated at the port of embarkation.

The squadron was briefly active in the reserve from 1947 to 1949, but does not appear to have been fully equipped or assigned enough aircrew. It served from 1959 to 1962 as a Boeing B-47 Stratojet squadron in Strategic Air Command.

The second predecessor of the squadron was activated in 1989 as the 6518th Test Squadron. The two squadrons were consolidated in 1992 as the 418th Test Squadron and have served in the flight test role.

== Mission ==
The 418th conducts developmental flight testing on the Lockheed C-5 Galaxy, Boeing C-17 Globemaster III, McDonnell Douglas KC-10 Extender, Boeing KC-46 Pegasus, Boeing KC-135 Stratotanker, and partner nation airlift and air refueling aircraft as the lead unit for the Global Reach Combined Test Force.

== History ==
=== World War II ===
==== Training in the United States ====
The first predecessor of the squadron was constituted in January 1942, shortly after the attack on Pearl Harbor, as the 28th Reconnaissance Squadron. However, before it was activated at Orlando Army Air Base, Florida on 1 June 1942 as one of the four original squadrons of the 100th Bombardment Group, it was redesignated as the 418th Bombardment Squadron. It was intended to be equipped with Consolidated B-24 Liberators. The Army Air Forces (AAF) decided to concentrate heavy bomber training under Second Air Force, and before the end of June, the squadron moved to Pendleton Field, Oregon. Its intended equipment changed to Boeing B-17 Flying Fortresses. As a result, the squadron only began organizing in October 1942, after it had moved to Gowen Field, Idaho. The following month, it moved to Walla Walla Army Air Field, Washington, where it received its first operational aircraft and began training.

The 418th completed its training and departed Kearney Army Air Field, Nebraska for the European Theater of Operations on 1 May 1943. The ground echelon sailed on the RMS Queen Elizabeth on 28 May, arriving at Greenock, Scotland on 3 June, while the air echelon engaged in additional training before departing via the northern ferry route to England about 21 May 1943.

==== Combat in Europe ====
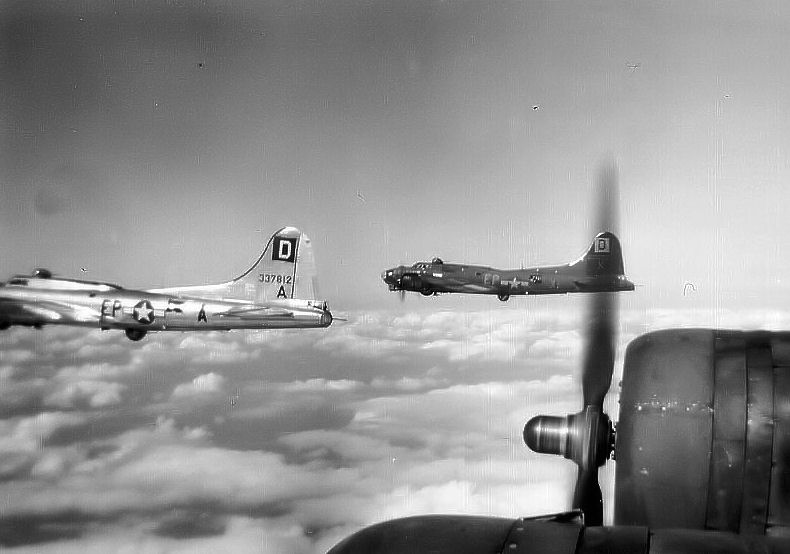
100th Bombardment Group B-17s on a combat mission

The squadron established itself at its combat station, RAF Thorpe Abbotts, on 9 June 1943, flying its first combat mission on 25 June. Until the end of the war, the squadron was primarily employed in the strategic bombing campaign against Germany. Until January 1944, it concentrated its operations on airfields in France, and industrial targets and naval facilities in France and Germany. On 17 August 1943, it participated in an attack on a factory manufacturing Messerschmitt Bf 109 fighters in Regensburg, Germany, which seriously disrupted production of that plane. Although the mission called for fighter escort, the fighter group assigned to protect the squadron's formation missed the rendezvous and the wing formation proceeded to the target unescorted. Enemy fighter opposition focused on the low "box", formed in part by the squadron. Ten of the 21 Flying Fortresses flown by the 100th Group were lost on this mission. Unknown to AAF intelligence at the time, the attack also destroyed almost all of the fuselage construction equipment for Germany's secret Me 262 jet fighter. Rather than returning to England, the unit turned south and recovered at bases in North Africa. For this action, the squadron was awarded the Distinguished Unit Citation (DUC).

From January to May 1944, the 418th attacked airfields, industrial targets, marshalling yards, and missile sites in Western Europe. During Big Week, it participated in the concentrated attack on the German aircraft industry. In March, it conducted a series of long range attacks against Berlin, for which it was awarded a second DUC. The raid of 6 March was to be the costliest mission flown by Eighth Air Force during the war. German fighter controllers detected that the formation including the squadron was unprotected by fighter escorts and concentrated interceptor attacks on it. Twenty-three B-17s from the formation failed to return. (Note: In addition to the squadrons of the 100th Group, the formation included those of the 95th Bombardment Group.) Two days later, German fighters shot down the leader of the 45th Combat Bombardment Wing, and the 100th Group took the lead in another attack on Berlin. From the summer of 1944, the 418th concentrated on German oil production facilities.

The squadron was occasionally diverted from strategic bombing to perform interdiction and air support missions. It attacked bridges and gun positions to support Operation Overlord, the landings at Normandy in June 1944. In August and September it supported Operation Cobra, the breakout at Saint Lo, and bombed enemy positions in Brest. As Allied forces drove across Northern France toward the Siegfried Line in October and November, it attacked transportation and ground defenses. During the Battle of the Bulge in December 1944 and January 1945, it attacked lines of communication and fortified villages in the Ardennes. It provided support for Operation Varsity, the airborne assault across the Rhine in March 1945. The squadron was awarded the French Croix de Guerre with Palm for attacks on heavily defended sites and dropping supplies to the French Forces of the Interior.

The squadron flew its last mission on 20 April 1945. Following, V-E Day, the squadron was initially programmed to be part of the occupation forces in Germany, but that plan was cancelled in September, and between October and December, the squadron's planes were ferried back to the United States or transferred to other units in theater. Its remaining personnel returned to the United States in December and the squadron was inactivated at the Port of Embarkation on 19 December 1945.

==== "Bloody Hundredth" ====
Starting with the Regensburg mission of August 1943, the squadrons of the 100th Bombardment Group began suffering losses among the highest in VIII Bomber Command. On 8 October, it lost seven aircraft on a raid on Bremen, including its lead and deputy lead aircraft. Only two days later, it lost twelve aircraft on an attack on Münster, again including the lead aircraft. The only group plane returning from that mission had lost two engines and had two wounded on board. (Note: This plane, named Rosie's Riveter, was lost in the spring of 1945, but its crew was able to bail out in Russian held territory.) Its highest one day loss occurred on the 6 March 1944 attack on Berlin, when 15 bombers failed to return. On 11 September 1944, the Luftwaffe put up its heaviest opposition in months, destroying 11 of the group's bombers. On 31 December 1944, half the 1st Bombardment Division's losses consisted of a dozen 100th bombers. With a group authorization of 40 B-17s, it lost 177 planes to enemy action. It became a legend for these losses and was referred to as the "Bloody Hundredth."

=== Air Force Reserve ===
The squadron was again activated in the reserve at Miami Army Air Field, Florida and assigned to the 100th Group on 29 May 1947. There, its training was supervised by the 473d AAF Base Unit (later the 2585th Air Force Reserve Training Center) of Air Defense Command (ADC). It does not appear the squadron was fully staffed or equipped with operational aircraft. In 1948 Continental Air Command (ConAC) assumed responsibility for managing reserve and Air National Guard units from ADC. The 418th was inactivated when ConAC reorganized its reserve units under the wing base organization system in June 1949. The squadron's personnel and equipment, along with other reserve units at Miami were transferred to elements of the 435th Troop Carrier Wing.

=== Strategic Air Command ===
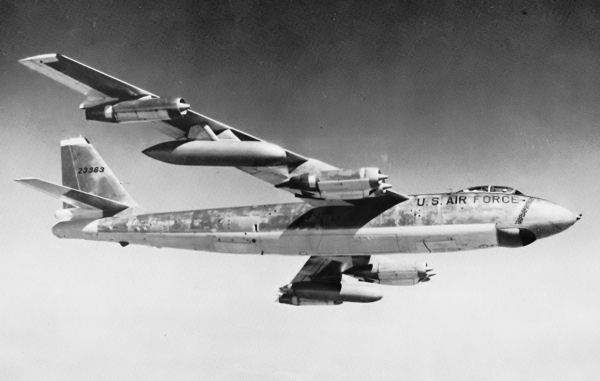
B-47 Stratojet as flown by the squadron

From 1958, the Boeing B-47 Stratojet wings of Strategic Air Command (SAC) began to assume an alert posture at their home bases, reducing the amount of time spent on alert at overseas bases. The SAC alert cycle divided itself into four parts: planning, flying, alert and rest to meet General Thomas S. Power's initial goal of maintaining one third of SAC’s planes on fifteen minute ground alert, fully fueled and ready for combat to reduce vulnerability to a Soviet missile strike. To implement this new system B-47 wings reorganized from three to four squadrons. The 418th was activated at Pease Air Force Base as the fourth squadron of the 100th Bombardment Wing. The alert commitment was increased to half the squadron's aircraft in 1962 and the four squadron pattern no longer met the alert cycle commitment, so the squadron was inactivated on 1 January 1962.

=== Flight Testing ===
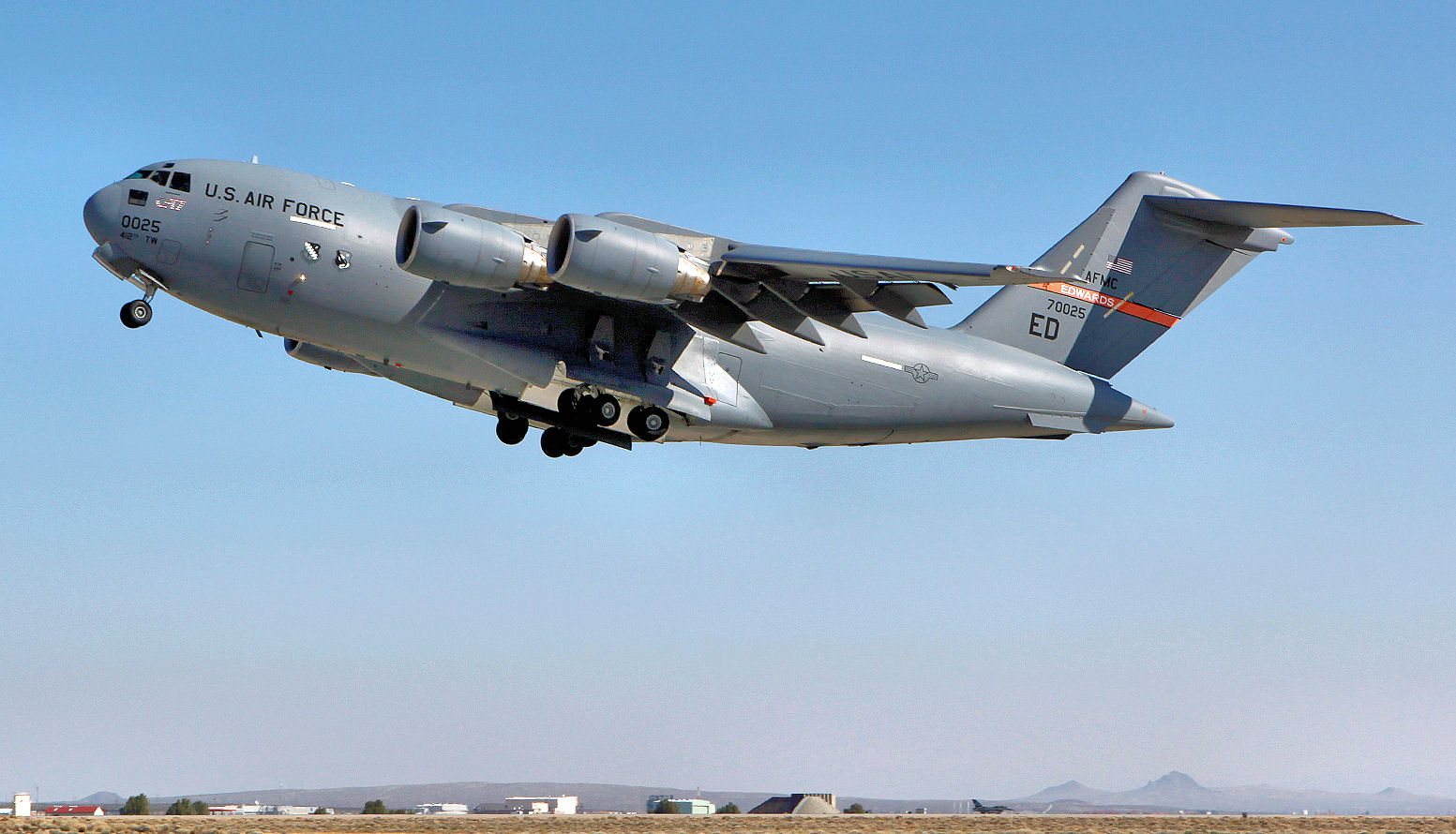
Squadron YC-17A Globemaster III (Note: Aircraft is McDonnell Douglas YC-17A Lot I Globemaster III, serial 87-0025, manufacturer's number T-1. This aircraft was essentially hand-built in 1990 as the first USAF C-17. The aircraft retired to the National Museum of the United States Air Force and arrived there on 25 April 2012.)

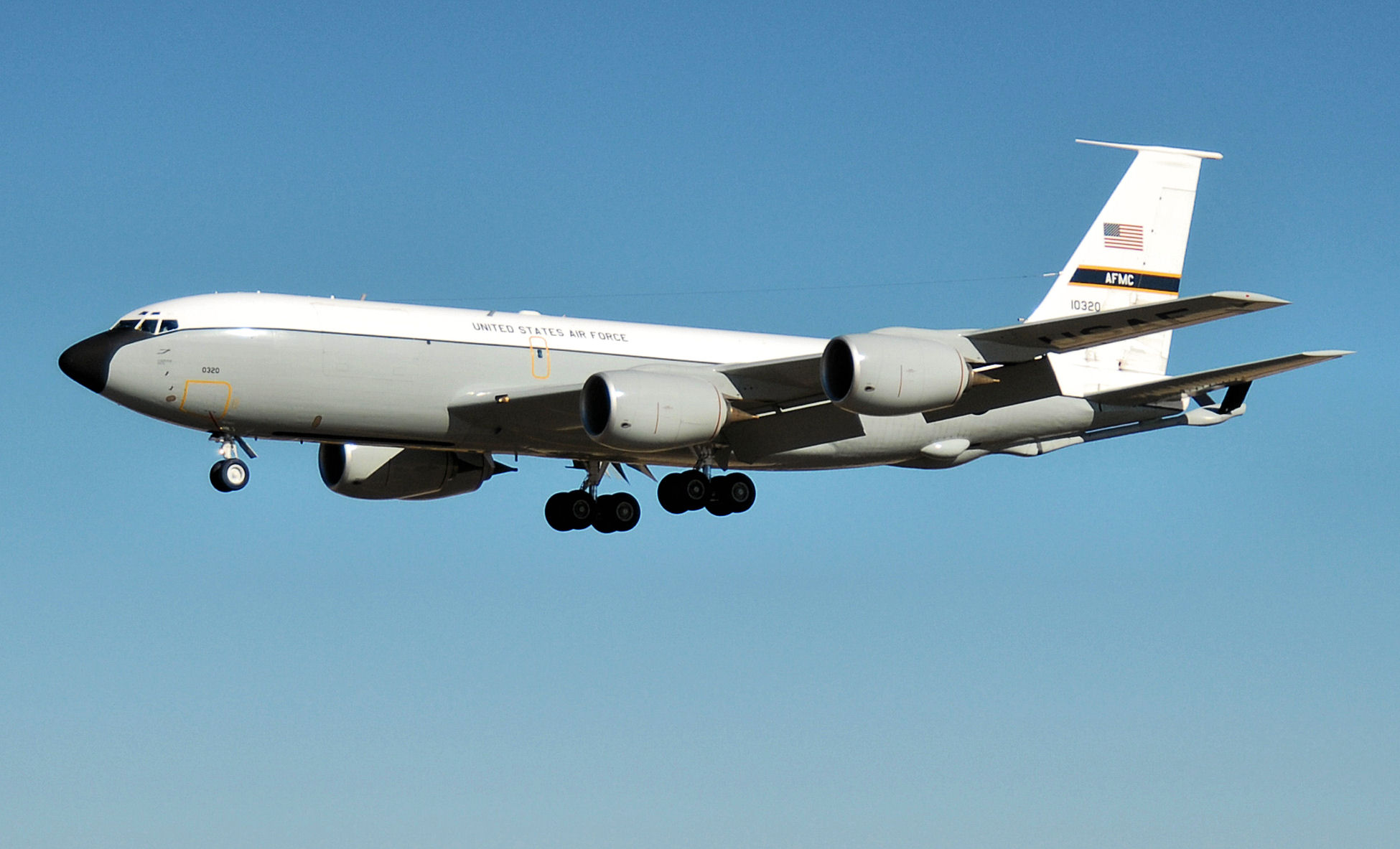
Squadron KC-135R Stratotanker (Note: Aircraft is Boeing KC-135R Stratotanker serial 61-0320. Shown landing after making first ever successful air-to-air refueling with an F-35 on 12 March 2008.)

The squadron's second predecessor was organized on 10 March 1989 as the 6518th Test Squadron at Edwards Air Force Base, California. It conducted flight testing of MC-130H Combat Talon II and AC-130U Spooky aircraft. On 1 October 1992 it was consolidated with the 418th Bombardment Squadron and the following day, the consolidated squadron was designated the 418th Test Squadron. A year later, the 412th Test Wing reorganized under the Objective Wing system, and the squadron was reassigned to the 412th Operations Group.

It supported test programs for miscellaneous large aircraft. It also managed small test programs including the Slingsby T-3 Firefly, Beechcraft T-6 Texan II, and Lockheed Martin C-130J Super Hercules. The squadron gained the Boeing C-17A Globemaster III program from the inactivating 417th Flight Test Squadron in 1995.

In 2000 the number of EC-18B Advanced Range Instrumentation Aircraft and Boeing NKC-135 types at Edwards was reduced. The remaining aircraft were transferred from the 452d Flight Test Squadron to the 418th on 1 October 2000. The squadron operated the EC-18s until 24 August 2001 when they were retired.

On 1 May 2015, the 445th Flight Test Squadron, which had been supporting test operations at Edwards was inactivated. Its mission was divided among other squadrons that were operating Combined Test Forces. In this realignment, active duty tanker crews, engineers and program managers moved to the 418th along with their aircraft and missions.

Starting in 2019, the squadron began Phase III testing of the Boeing KC-46 Pegasus. Prior phases of Pegasus testing had been led by Boeing Aircraft. This testing included certification of aircraft that could refuel the KC-46 or be refueled by it. At that time, the squadron was involved in 24 separate test projects, including upgrades for both the C-17 and the Lockheed C-5 Galaxy. Later that year, the squadron began tests of Rapid Dragon, using C-130 and C-17 aircraft to air drop palletized long-range munitions systems. It has also used its Globemasters to test the parachute system for NASA's Orion spacecraft.

== Lineage ==
418th Bombardment Squadron

- Constituted as the 28th Reconnaissance Squadron (Heavy) on 28 January 1942

Redesignated 418th Bombardment Squadron (Heavy) on 22 April 1942
Activated on 1 June 1942
Redesignated 418th Bombardment Squadron, Heavy on 20 August 1943
Inactivated on 19 December 1945
Redesignated 418th Bombardment Squadron, Very Heavy on 13 May 1947
Activated in the reserve on 29 May 1947
Inactivated on 27 June 1949
Redesignated 418th Bombardment Squadron, Medium on 1 December 1958
Activated on 1 March 1959
Discontinued and inactivated on 1 January 1962
Consolidated with the 6518th Test Squadron as the 6518th Test Squadron on 1 October 1992

418th Flight Test Squadron

- Designated as the 6518th Test Squadron and activated on 10 March 1989

Consolidated with the 418th Bombardment Squadron on 1 October 1992
Redesignated 418th Test Squadron on 2 October 1992
Redesignated 418th Flight Test Squadron on 1 March 1994

=== Assignments ===
- 100th Bombardment Group, 1 June 1942 – 19 December 1945
- 100th Bombardment Group, 29 May 1947 – 27 June 1949
- 100th Bombardment Wing, 1 March 1959 – 1 January 1962
- 6510th Test Wing (later 412th Test Wing), 10 March 1989
- 412th Operations Group, 1 October 1993 – present

=== Stations ===
- Orlando Army Air Base, Florida 1 June 1942
- Barksdale Field, Louisiana, 18 June 1942
- Pendleton Field, Oregon, 26 June 1942
- Gowen Field, Idaho, 28 August 1942
- Walla Walla Army Air Field, Washington, 31 October 1942
- Wendover Field, Utah, 30 November 1942
- Sioux City Army Air Base, Iowa, 6 January 1943
- Kearney Army Air Field, Nebraska, 4 February – 1 May 1943
- RAF Thorpe Abbotts (Station 139), England, 2 June 1943 – 11 December 1945
- Camp Kilmer, New Jersey, 17–19 December 1945
- Miami Army Air Field (later Miami International Airport), Florida, 29 May 1947 – 27 June 1949
- Pease Air Force Base, New Hampshire, 1 March 1959 – 30 April 1966
- Edwards Air Force Base, California, 10 March 1989 – present

=== Aircraft ===
- Boeing B-17 Flying Fortress, 1942–1945
- Boeing B-47 Stratojet, 1959–1961
- Lockheed MC-130H Hercules, 1989–1994
- Lockheed AC-130U Hercules, 1990–1995
- Lockheed C-141 Starlifter, 1993–1998
- Short C-23 Sherpa, 1993–1997
- North American T-39 Sabreliner, 1993–present
- Boeing C-17A Globemaster III, 1995–present
- Lockheed NC-130H Hercules, 1995–present
- Beechcraft C-12 Huron, 1997–present
- Bell Boeing CV-22 Osprey, 2000–present
- EC-18B Stratoliner, 2000–2001
- Boeing NKC-135E, 2000–2006
- Boeing KC-135R Stratotanker, 2000–present
- Slingsby T-3 Firefly
- Beechcraft T-6 Texan I I
- Lockheed Martin C-130J Super Hercules
- Boeing KC-46 Pegasus, 2019 – present

=== Awards and campaigns ===
| Award streamer | Award | Dates | Notes |
|---|---|---|---|
| | Distinguished Unit Citation | 17 August 1943 | Germany, 418th Bombardment Squadron |
| | Distinguished Unit Citation | 4, 6, 8 March 1944 | Berlin, Germany, 418th Bombardment Squadron |
| | Air Force Outstanding Unit Award | 1 January 1996–31 December 1996 | 418th Flight Test Squadron |
| | Air Force Outstanding Unit Award | 1 January 1997–31 December 1998 | 418th Flight Test Squadron |
| | Air Force Outstanding Unit Award | 1 January 2010–31 December 2011 | 418th Flight Test Squadron |
| | Air Force Outstanding Unit Award | 1 January 2012–31 December 2012 | 418th Flight Test Squadron |
| | Air Force Outstanding Unit Award | 1 January 2013–31 December 2013 | 418th Flight Test Squadron |
| | French Croix de Guerre with Palm | 25 June 1944 –31 December 1944 | 418th Bombardment Squadron |

| Campaign Streamer | Campaign | Dates | Notes |
|---|---|---|---|
| | Air Offensive, Europe | 2 June 1943 – 5 June 1944 | 418th Bombardment Squadron |
| | Air Combat, EAME Theater | 2 June 1943 – 11 May 1945 | 418th Bombardment Squadron |
| | Normandy | 6 June 1944 – 24 July 1944 | 418th Bombardment Squadron |
| | Northern France | 25 July 1944 – 14 September 1944 | 418th Bombardment Squadron |
| | Rhineland | 15 September 1944 – 21 March 1945 | 418th Bombardment Squadron |
| | Ardennes-Alsace | 16 December 1944 – 25 January 1945 | 418th Bombardment Squadron |
| | Central Europe | 22 March 1944 – 21 May 1945 | 418th Bombardment Squadron |

== See also ==
- List of United States Air Force test squadrons
