= Tanker Task Force =

United States Air Force organization

A Tanker Task Force is an organization of the United States Air Force that includes numbered units of the Air Force from bases in a certain region.

== Task forces ==
=== Regional ===
- Alaskan Tanker Task Force located at Eielson AFB, Alaska, (Replaced the Eielson Tanker Task Force operated by the 6th Strategic Wing
- Caribbean Tanker Task Force
- European Tanker Task Force, located at RAF Mildenhall and RAF Fairford, in the UK, (Replaced the Spanish Tanker Task Force, located at Torrejon AB, Spain, operated by the 98th Strategic Wing and Detachment 1, 98th Strategic Wing, located at RAF Upper Heyford, and RAF Mildenhall, in the UK,
- Pacific Tanker Task Force (formerly Andersen Tanker Task Force) (Replaced the Foreign Legion Tanker Task Force operated by the 3d Air Division at Andersen AFB, Guam and forward based at Clark AB, Philippines and later as the King Cobra Tanker Task Force, located at Tahkli AB, Thailand and the Tiger Cub Tanker Task Force at Don Maung AP, Thailand These units were later renamed Young Tanker Task Force that was split between Kadena AB, Okinawa operated the 4252d Strategic Wing (later:) 376th Strategic Wing and the 4258th Strategic Wing (later:) 307th Strategic Wing / 310th Strategic Wing located at U-Tapao AB, Thailand and the 3960th Strategic Wing (later:) 43d Strategic Wing at Andersen AFB, Guam
- Goose Tanker Task Force located at RCAF Goose Bay, Labrador, operated the 95th Strategic Wing

=== Base ===
- Eielson Tanker Task Force (renamed: Alaska Tanker Task Force
- Loring Tanker Task Force located at Loring AFB, ME, operated the 42d Bombardment Wing, Heavy (defunct)
- Two Buck Tanker Task Force located at March AFB, CA, operated the 22d Bombardment Wing, Heavy (defunct) - Deployed Squadron size aircraft deployments to Southeast Asia
- Goose Tanker Task Force located at RCAF Goose Bay, Labrador, operated the 95th Strategic Wing (defunct) - Goose ALert Force
- Northeast Tanker Task Force located at Pease Air National Guard Base, NH, operated the 157 Air Refueling Wing.
- Lajes Tanker Task Force located at Lages AB, Azores, operated the 509th Bombardment Wing, Medium (defunct)
- Northeast Tanker Task Force located at Ernest Harmon AFB, Nfld, operated the 4081st Strategic Wing (defunct) KC-97's
- Dow Tanker Task Force located at Dow AFB, ME, operated the 4038th Strategic Wing (Later:) 397th Bombardment Wing, Heavy (defunct) KC-97's
- Westover Tanker Task Force located at Westover AFB, MA, operated the 4050th(Later:) 499th Air Refueling Wing (defunct) KC-97's
