= Italian Studies (film) =

- Theatrical release poster
- Directed by: Adam Leon
- Written by: Adam Leon
- Produced by: Brad Becker-Parton; Joshua Astrachan; Jamund Washington; Andrea Roa; Jason Reif
- Starring: Vanessa Kirby; David Ajala; Simon Brickner; Annika Wahlsten; Annabel Hoffman; Maya Hawke
- Cinematography: Brett Jutkiewicz
- Edited by: Erin DeWitt; Sara Shaw; Kristan Sprague; Betsy Kagan; Smba
- Music by: Nicholas Britell
- Production companies: Animal Kingdom; Topic Studios; Tango Entertainment
- Distributed by: Magnolia Pictures
- Release dates: June 12, 2021 (Tribeca); January 14, 2022
- Running time: 81 minutes
- Country: United States
- Language: English
- Box office: $5,895

Italian Studies is a 2021 American drama film, written and directed by Adam Leon. It stars Vanessa Kirby, David Ajala, Simon Brickner, Annika Wahlsten, Annabel Hoffman, and Maya Hawke.

A writer loses her memory in New York City, and attempting to find her way home, she connects with a group of strangers in conversations, real and imagined.

It had its world premiere at the Tribeca Film Festival on June 12, 2021. It was released on January 14, 2022, by Magnolia Pictures in theaters and VOD.

== Plot ==
Opening on the protagonist going with her partner to a party with young people in Shoreditch, London. The scene then cuts to daytime. She bums a cigarette from a young American girl who recognizes her but she can't recall knowing her.

One ordinary day in New York City, the protagonist goes into a hardware store, leaving her dog tied up outside. She steps out, and suddenly she's disoriented and has forgotten everything. She then wanders through the city aimlessly for an unclear period of time.

Finding some steps she vaguely recognises, she sits, recalling having spoken to some young people there. As this character walks the streets with her seemingly endless stride, her memory seems to fail her. She remembers snippets of conversations. At a diner she meets one, and we observe that she's not even sure of her diet even but believes she may be a vegetarian.

As she's talking with the diner teen, she confesses that she can't even answer basic questions about herself. She argues in a corner shop with the attendant as she has no money to pay. In another, she takes a few things and bolts.

Going to a small hotel, she tells the receptionist she misplaced her key for room 234 but, as she can't even provide a name he can't give it to her. Outside, she finds somewhere deserted to pee and sleeps in a stairwell.

A woman approaches her, asking if she's the author Alina Reynolds, author of Italian Studies. She saw her do a reading from the book two years ago, and describes it as an anthology of coming-of age stories. With this information, she is able to find the book in the library.

Alina reads a chapter from the book, and she sees a reference to room 234. With a faint smile on her face, she borrows a pen to sign it. A man in the library tells her off for defacing the book, but apologises upon realising she is the author.

Reading the chapter Lucinda, more of Alina's memory returns. We see the interviews with the teens was with a younger version of herself, in her early 20s. The teen from the diner was Simon, who tells the story of his first love.

Various teens in the group tell Alina their perspectives and anectdotes. At a fast food restaurant, the older version of herself had mentioned she is writing a novel based on ideas she gets from them, so they hand her the check. Explaining she hasn't got any money, the teens pool together their dollars after exchanging incredulous looks.

Going to a party with more youth, Alina doesn't connect with them like she had. Receiving open hostility, she finds herself swearing and defensive. Alone with Simon, she says they are both broken. She kisses him and he leaves.

Cutting to a beach, Alina catches up to Lucinda. As they talk, she suddenly remember she lost her little white dog. She hurries back the city, returns to the hardware store and recovers it.

In the present day, the girl who had offered Alina a cigarette encourages her to look up Simon, who is a college student. She thinks it's a bad idea as she prefers to preserve the memory, implying it would needlessly stir things. Now married, Alina alludes to some mental difficulties she had passed through, which she believes her husband fears may return.

Alina heads home with her husband, and we are shown the images of the main interviewees she had interviewed.

== Cast ==
- Vanessa Kirby as Alina Reynolds
- Simon Brickner as Simon
- Annika Wahlsten as Annika
- Annabel Hoffman as Annabel
- David Ajala as Ade
- Maya Hawke as Erin
- Fred Hechinger as Matt

== Production ==
In March 2019, it was announced Vanessa Kirby had joined the cast of the film, with Adam Leon directing from a screenplay he wrote.

== Release ==
It had its world premiere at the Tribeca Film Festival on June 12, 2021. In October 2021, Magnolia Pictures acquired the distribution rights to the film. The film was released in theaters on January 14, 2022.

== Reception ==
=== Box office ===
In the U.S. and Canada, the film earned $3,401 from seven theaters in its opening weekend and $579 in its second.

=== Critical response ===
Italian Studies holds a 40% approval rating on review aggregator website Rotten Tomatoes, based on 52 reviews, with a weighted average of 5.60/10.

In a positive review, Rolling Stone called the film, "Unforgettable from the jump," features a "raw, guileless, egoless performance" from Vanessa Kirby, and that it "may be the most immersive memory loss movie of all time." The Los Angeles Times wrote, "Italian Studies is a unique curio of a film, a free sketch of time and place melting into a singular subjective experience that asks, “Does memory matter?” In a mixed review, Variety wrote that "Adam Leon’s minor-key, jaggedly structured indie isn't concerned with the specific whens, hows and whys of Alina’s out-of-nowhere amnesia, but with the hazy in-the-moment sensation of being struck with it, the sensation of stumbling for the lightswitch in your own mind. That's a nebulous-sounding dramatic proposition, though as performed by a nervy, live-wire Vanessa Kirby, it becomes a tensely compelling one."
