= Charm City Kings =

2020 film directed by Angel Manuel Soto

- Original release poster
- Directed by: Ángel Manuel Soto
- Screenplay by: Sherman Payne
- Story by: Chris Boyd; Kirk Sullivan; Barry Jenkins
- Based on: 12 O'Clock Boys by Lotfy Nathan
- Produced by: Caleeb Pinkett; Clarence Hammond; Marc Bienstock
- Starring: Jahi Di'Allo Winston; Meek Mill; Will Catlett; Teyonah Parris
- Cinematography: Katelin Arizmendi
- Edited by: Luis Carballar
- Music by: Alex Somers
- Production companies: Sony Pictures Classics (Note: Credited under Sony Pictures); Overbrook Entertainment
- Distributed by: Warner Max (through Warner Bros. Pictures)
- Release dates: January 27, 2020 (Sundance); October 8, 2020 (United States)
- Running time: 125 minutes
- Country: United States
- Language: English

Charm City Kings is a 2020 American drama film directed by Ángel Manuel Soto from a screenplay by Sherman Payne and a story by Chris Boyd, Kirk Sullivan, and Barry Jenkins. It is based on the 2013 documentary 12 O'Clock Boys by Lotfy Nathan. It stars Jahi Di'Allo Winston, Meek Mill, Will Catlett, and Teyonah Parris.

The film had its world premiere at the Sundance Film Festival on January 27, 2020. It was released on October 8, 2020, by HBO Max. Will Smith and Jada Pinkett Smith serve as the executive producers. The film was removed from HBO Max in July 2022.

== Plot ==
14-year-old Mouse lives in Baltimore, Maryland with his single mother and younger sister. Mouse is interested in motorbikes, a big part of the culture in Baltimore, but his mother disapproves as his older brother Stro died in a biking accident at the age of 17. Taking place once a week during the summer, there is an event called The Ride, where people bring out their motorbikes and do stunts in the street. Mouse's mother forbids him from attending, but he sneaks out anyway to attend with his friends Lamont and Sweartagawd.

Mouse purchases a run-down four-wheel motorbike and is detained by police while driving it home. He is picked up by police detective Rivers, who has known Mouse from a young age through a police outreach program with his school. Rivers tells Mouse he can come to him for advice any time and implores him to stay out of trouble, but Mouse ignores him. Mouse meets a new girl down the street, Nicki, who is interested in photography; Mouse invites her to come along to The Ride. There, Mouse attempts a trick on his four-wheeler but crashes; they later witness a biker gang known as the Midnight Clique lead the police on a high-speed chase and escape. One of the bikers is a local legend known as Blax, who recently got out of prison.

Mouse, Lamont and Sweartagawd visit the Midnight Clique's hangout spot later that night, who tells them to leave. Mouse later meets Blax outside a bike repair shop where he works as part of his parole program. Blax says he knew Mouse's brother Stro, a member of the Clique; he invites Mouse into the shop and offers him a box of scraps to build his own bike. Mouse asks if Blax would provide Lamont and Sweartagawd with the same opportunity; Blax agrees, impressed with his loyalty. Mouse starts ditching his job at the local animal hospital to spend more time at Blax's auto shop.

Blax asks Mouse to deliver a rebuilt high-end bike to a customer across town. Mouse instead drives it to Nicki's house and picks her up for a joyride. They are approached by Derrick, an old friend of Stro's, who asks for a quick ride around the block; unable to say no, Mouse gives him the bike, and Derrick takes off. Unable to face Blax, Mouse goes to Lamont and Sweartagawd for help, who inform him that Derrick is notorious for chopping up bikes and selling the parts. The three confront Derrick at his chop shop to ask for the bike back; he pulls a gun on them and tells them to leave. The Midnight Clique arrive, led by Blax, who know everything; warn Derrick to never steal from them again. Lamont, whom Derrick had pulled the gun on beforehand, attacks a defenseless Derrick and nearly beats him to death before a Clique member holds him back.

Blax, upset with Mouse, tells him he is not allowed to work on building his bike anymore and will have to work hard around the shop to earn his respect back. Mouse, who is concerned about his mother falling behind on bills, instead asks Blax to get him on the auto shop payroll; Blax refuses. Mouse quits working at the shop and he, Lamont, and Sweartagawd join the Midnight Clique's drug delivery operation; the Clique loans them brand-new bikes and pays them well. Nicki approaches Mouse in a park to give him a picture she took of him, but he acts uninterested, riding off with another girl. Meanwhile, Rivers keeps tailing him around town and pestering him about his activities; Mouse tells him to leave him alone. Rivers pays a visit to Blax in his shop and warns him to stay away from Mouse, considering him a bad influence on the teen.

Mouse's mother finds his hidden stash of hundred-dollar bills, and after he refuses to tell her where it came from she kicks him out of the house; Mouse moves in with Sweartagawd. Lamont hatches a plan to rob a local convenience store to prove their worth to the Clique; Mouse and a hesitant Sweartagawd agree. They ask the Clique for a gun, who gives them one; Blax notices and demands that the Clique leave Mouse alone, but they refuse as he's a skilled rider for their operation.

Blax summons Mouse to the garage to confront him, but Mouse notices something is wrong with Blax's dog and insists they go to the vet immediately. The vet explains that surgery would likely cause more complications for the dog, who is old, but ultimately leaves the decision of either surgery or euthanasia to Blax; Blax agrees to put his dog down, but only if Mouse does it, which he successfully does. Blax then explains the truth of Stro's death to Mouse: Blax offered him a job running drugs, and Stro died during the job. An upset Mouse leaves.

As Mouse and his friends prepare the convenience store robbery, Lamont takes the gun, but Mouse insists they do not fire it. The robbery goes wrong when Lamont accidentally fires a shot and the owner's wife returns fire, killing Sweartagawd. Mouse and Lamont flee separately as Detective Rivers, who had been tailing Mouse, gives chase. Mouse heads to Blax's shop and explains everything as Rivers pulls up to the shop with backup. Blax tells Mouse to change into a worker's uniform as an alibi and takes the fall for the robbery. Rivers, despite knowing the truth, arrests Blax. Rivers gives Mouse a ride home, where he reconciles with his mother.

A year later, Mouse has returned to working at the vet and adopted Blax's dog. He reconnects with Nicki and apologizes for his past behavior; she agrees to meet up with him again. Mouse runs into Lamont on the street but they have little to say to each other, having drifted apart. Mouse returns home to surprise his mother with fresh groceries.

== Cast ==
- Jahi Di'Allo Winston as Mouse
- Meek Mill as Blax
- Chino Braxton as Jamal
- Will Catlett as Detective Rivers
- Teyonah Parris as Terri
- Donielle Tremaine Hansley as Lamont
- Jeanette Maus as Dr. Parish
- Kezii Curtis as Sweartagawd
- Charles D. Clark as Trap House King Pin
- Marvin Raheem as Derrick
- Chandler DuPont as Nicki
- Milan Ray as Shay

== Production ==
In September 2018, it was announced Jahi Di'Allo Winston, Will Catlett and Teyonah Parris had joined the cast of the film, with Ángel Manuel Soto directing from a screenplay by Sherman Payne and a story by Kirk Sullivan, Chris Boyd and Barry Jenkins. Overbrook Entertainment produced the film, with Jada Pinkett Smith and Will Smith as executive producers and Sony Pictures Classics distributing, with the film being an adaptation of the documentary 12 O'Clock Boys. In October 2018, Meek Mill joined the cast of the film.

Principal photography began in October 2018.

== Release ==
It had its world premiere at the Sundance Film Festival on January 27, 2020. It was also scheduled to screen at South by Southwest on March 15, 2020, but the festival was cancelled due to the COVID-19 pandemic. It was scheduled to be released on April 10, 2020, by Sony Pictures Classics, but was rescheduled to August 14, 2020, due to the pandemic. In May 2020, it was announced HBO Max had acquired distribution rights to the film. It was released on October 8, 2020.

== Reception ==
On Rotten Tomatoes, the film has an approval rating of 79% based on reviews from 57 critics, with an average rating of 7.2/10. The site's critics consensus reads: "Charm City Kings falls shy of more effective similarly themed coming-of-age films, but strong direction and engaging performances make its flaws easy to forgive." At Metacritic, the film received a weighted average score of 62 out of 100 based on 13 reviews from mainstream critics, indicating "generally favorable" reviews.

Nick Allen of RogerEbert.com reviewed the film from its world premiere at the Sundance Film Festival, and called it "an incredible triumph from a slew of fresh talent."
