= Gimme the Loot =

Gimme the Loot may refer to:

- Gimme the Loot (film), a 2012 American comedy film
- "Gimme the Loot", song by the Notorious B.I.G. from Ready to Die
- "Gimme the Loot", song by Russian rapper Big Baby Tape
