= Feed the Fire =

Feed the Fire may refer to:

- Feed the Fire (Timothy B. Schmit album), 2001
- Feed the Fire (Betty Carter album), 1994
- Feed the Fire (Steppenwolf album), 1996
- Feed the Fire (Samuel Mancini album), 2021
