= Rantz =

Rantz is a surname of German origin. Notable people with the surname include:

- Jim Rantz (born 1938), American baseball player and executive
- Joe Rantz (1914–2007), American rower
