= Ángel Manuel Soto =

Puerto Rican filmmaker

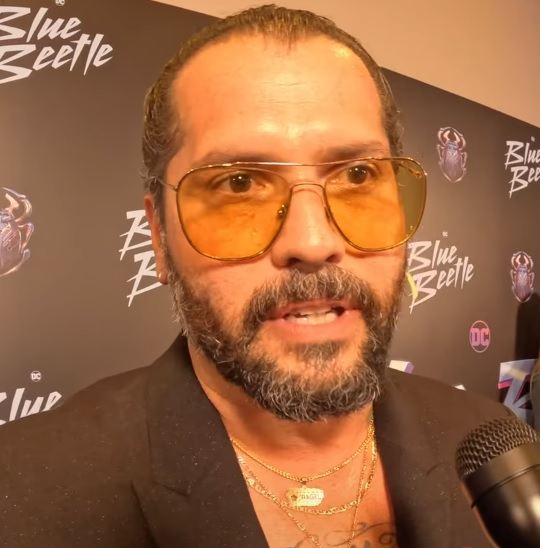
- Soto in 2023
- Born: January 28, 1983 (age 43); Santurce, San Juan, Puerto Rico
- Education: Universidad del Sagrado Corazón
- Occupations: Film director; film producer; screenwriter
- Years active: 2009–present

Ángel Manuel Soto (born January 28, 1983) is a Puerto Rican filmmaker. He is best known for directing the films Charm City Kings (2020) and Blue Beetle (2023).

== Early life ==
Ángel Manuel Soto was born in Santurce, a neighborhood in San Juan, Puerto Rico. His parents were a car salesman and a flight attendant. During his youth, Soto was involved in soccer, boxing, and music, thus forming the band Los Cheveres, a punk rock group formed in the early 2000s, on to which inspired some of his later projects. As he grew up, he studied architecture, documentary filmmaking, and writing. Soto began his career as a TV producer and later worked on art direction at a local advertising agency.

== Career ==
Before working on his first short film, Soto worked at Standard Style Boutique in Kansas City. During that time, he rented all the rooms in his house and slept on the floor for 2 months in order to save money. In 2009, Soto released the short film 22weeks, which ended up winning multiple awards, including the Bronze Telly Award in 2010. After that, he has released a variety of short films, documentary shorts, and feature films, including La Granja and El Púgil. Both of these films were nominated to various film awards at film festivals, including the Chicago Latino Film Festival, the Miami Film Festival, and the Tribeca Film Festival.

In 2018, it was announced that Soto would direct Charm City Kings, a film based on the 2013 documentary 12 O'Clock Boys. The film had its world premiere at the Sundance Film Festival on January 27, 2020, where it ended up winning special jury prize for its ensemble. The film was scheduled to be released on April 10, 2020, by Sony Pictures Classics, but was rescheduled to August 14, 2020, due to the COVID-19 pandemic. In May 2020, it was announced HBO Max had acquired distribution rights to the film. It was released on October 8, 2020.

In February 2021, Soto was announced as the director of a film centered around the DC superhero Blue Beetle for DC Films and Warner Bros. The superhero's alter-ego, a Mexican-American teenager called Jaime Reyes, made Blue Beetle the first DC film and the first live-action superhero film overall to feature a Latino superhero as the lead. The film was written by Mexican-born writer Gareth Dunnet-Alcocer. The film starred Xolo Maridueña, Bruna Marquezine, Raoul Max Trujillo, Susan Sarandon, and George Lopez. Blue Beetle was released on August 18, 2023 to positive reviews for Maridueña's performance, action scenes, themes, and Soto's directing, but was a commercial disappointment. Despite the poor box office, Vanity Fair named it one of the best films of 2023 and received two nominations at the 51st Saturn Awards, winning one.

In March 2021, it was announced that Soto would direct an upcoming Transformers film, and write it with screenwriter Marco Ramirez. Despite there being no significant updates on its progress or plot, Soto is still involved with the film as of May 2024.

In August 2023, it was announced that Soto would direct an action film titled The Wrecking Crew starring Jason Mamoa and Dave Bautista.

In May 2024, it was announced that Soto would direct a film based Square Enix's Just Cause series for Universal Pictures. Story Kitchen's Dmitri M. Johnson and Mike Goldberg producing, alongside 87North Productions' David Leitch and Kelly McCormick.

In June 2024, it was announced that Soto, alongside Gareth Dunnet-Alcocer and Galen Vaisman, would executive produce a Blue Beetle animated series set in the DC Universe (DCU).

== Filmography ==
Short film

Year	Title	Director	Producer	Writer	Editor	DoP	Notes
2009	22weeks	Yes	Yes	Yes	Yes	No	Also production designer, art director and visual effects supervisor
2010	Sexy Mortal	Yes	Yes	Yes		Yes	
2011	En la Privacidad de mi Hogar	Yes	Yes	Yes	Yes	Yes	
2012	El Gallo	Yes	Yes	Yes			
2016	The Second Line: A Parade Against Violence	Yes					
2016	Repensando a Cuba	Yes					
2016	Inside Trump's America	Yes					Video
2016	I Struggle Where You Vacation	Yes					
2016	El Púgil	Yes	Yes	Yes	Yes	Yes	Documentary
2016	Bashir's Dream	Yes			Yes		Documentary
2018	Dinner Party	Yes	Yes				

Feature film

Year	Title	Director	Producer	Writer
2012	Frailty	Yes	No	No
2015	La Granja	Yes	Yes	Yes
2020	Charm City Kings	Yes	No	No
2023	Blue Beetle	Yes	No	No
2026	The Wrecking Crew	Yes	No	No

TV

Year	Title	Director	Producer	Writer	Notes
2022	Menudo: Forever Young	Yes			4-episode miniseries
