= The Dead Don't Die (2019 film) =

2019 American absurdist horror comedy film

- Theatrical release poster
- Directed by: Jim Jarmusch
- Written by: Jim Jarmusch
- Produced by: Carter Logan; Joshua Astrachan
- Starring: Bill Murray; Adam Driver; Tilda Swinton; Chloë Sevigny; Steve Buscemi; Danny Glover; Caleb Landry Jones; Rosie Perez; Iggy Pop; Sara Driver; RZA; Carol Kane; Austin Butler; Selena Gomez; Tom Waits
- Cinematography: Frederick Elmes
- Edited by: Affonso Gonçalves
- Music by: SQÜRL
- Production companies: Kill the Head; Longride; Animal Kingdom; Chimney; Film i Väst
- Distributed by: Focus Features (United States); Universal Pictures (International)
- Release dates: May 14, 2019 (Cannes); June 14, 2019 (United States)
- Running time: 104 minutes
- Country: United States
- Language: English
- Box office: $15.3 million

The Dead Don't Die is a 2019 American absurdist zombie comedy and metacinematic film written and directed by Jim Jarmusch. It features an ensemble cast including Bill Murray, Adam Driver, Chloë Sevigny, Steve Buscemi, Tilda Swinton, Tom Waits, Danny Glover, Caleb Landry Jones, Rosie Perez, Iggy Pop, Carol Kane, RZA, Austin Butler, and Selena Gomez and follows a small town's police force as they combat a sudden zombie invasion.

The film had its world premiere as the opening film at the Cannes Film Festival on May 14, 2019. It was released in theaters in North America on June 14, 2019, by Focus Features, and earned $15.3 million at the box office. It received mixed reviews from critics.

== Plot ==
In rural Centerville, police Chief Cliff Robertson and officer Ronnie Peterson respond to a report from farmer Frank Miller regarding a missing chicken. They briefly interact with Hermit Bob, a bearded eccentric, in the woods. On their way back to the station, Cliff notices there is still daylight after 8 p.m. and Ronnie's watch and cell phone stop working. Later, at a diner, hardware store owner Hank Thompson hears a radio report concerning polar fracking.

Two corpses reanimate when night falls and kill the two diner employees, who are discovered by Hank the next morning. Ronnie believes zombies killed the employees. Young travelers Zoe, Jack, and Zack stop for gas and meet Bobby.

At the Centerville Juvenile Detention Center, inmate Geronimo tells fellow inmates Olivia and Stella that polar fracking has altered the Earth's rotation.

Cliff and Ronnie find open graves at the cemetery, while Hermit Bob spies on them. Cliff emphatically rejects Ronnie's suggestion of informing Farmer Miller of the general suspicion that zombies are on the loose. Ronnie teaches Cliff how to kill zombies, and Bobby and Hank prepare weapons. Motel owner Danny Perkins watches news about pets behaving strangely and then finds out his cats are missing. Other of Farmer Miller's animals have disappeared.

That evening, more zombies rise, and Danny is attacked and transformed. Cliff and Ronnie bring supplies to the station and tell fellow officer Mindy Morrison about the zombies. The corpse of Mallory, a local alcoholic, reanimates in the police station and Ronnie decapitates her.

Two corpses reanimate at the funeral home and are beheaded with a sword by Zelda Winston, who recently bought the funeral home. She goes to the police station, where the three officers leave her to operate communications. The cops drive through town and find the three travelers dead at the motel. Ronnie beheads the bodies, much to Mindy's distress, and takes Zoe's Sturgill Simpson CD. Zelda waves her hand over the police computer and it generates code. Ronnie begins playing the CD on the police car sound system, but Cliff throws the CD out the car window.

Hank and Bobby face zombies at the hardware store. Each zombie says only one word, related to something from their past or an item they see as a zombie. Zombies maul Farmer Miller. Inmates Geronimo, Olivia, and Stella flee the detention center, again observed by Hermit Bob. When zombies overwhelm the patrol car at the cemetery, Officer Mindy sees her dead grandmother, and exits the car, only to be engulfed by zombies. Ronnie says he knew all would end badly because Jim gave him the entire script ahead of time, while Cliff only got the pages for his own scenes.

Zelda drives Ronnie's car through town, stopping to behead one last Fashion Zombie, and then walks calmly through the cemetery with sword in hand. Zombies amble away from the patrol car as a spinning UFO appears over the cemetery. Cliff and Ronnie watch as it beams up Zelda and departs. The two leave the car, and kill zombies including Bobby, Miller, Danny, Hank, and Mindy. Hermit Bob watches from the woods through binoculars, lamenting how the world is a terrible place, as zombies overwhelm Cliff and Ronnie.

== Cast ==
- Bill Murray as Chief Cliff Robertson, a police officer who resides in Centerville.
- Adam Driver as Officer Ronnie Peterson, Cliff's partner and fellow police officer.
- Tilda Swinton as Zelda Winston, an eccentric resident of Centerville who has recently bought the Funeral Home, and whose mysterious and exotic origin is not quite comprehensible to her neighbors.
- Chloë Sevigny as Officer Mindy Morrison, a fellow police officer who works with Cliff and Ronnie.
- Steve Buscemi as Frank Miller, a farmer and resident of Centerville.
- Danny Glover as Hank Thompson, the hardware store owner and resident of Centerville.
- Caleb Landry Jones as Bobby Wiggins, the gas station attendant and toy shop owner.
- Selena Gomez as Zoe, a young traveler.
- Austin Butler as Jack, a young traveler, who travels alongside Zoe and Zack.
- Luka Sabbat as Zack, a young traveler, who travels alongside Zoe and Jack.
- Rosie Perez as Posie Juarez, a news anchor and reporter.
- Eszter Balint as Fern, a waitress at the local diner.
- Iggy Pop as Male Coffee Zombie
- Sara Driver as Female Coffee Zombie
- RZA as Dean, a delivery worker who has a friendship with Bobby.
- Carol Kane as Mallory O'Brien, the town drunk.
- Larry Fessenden as Danny Perkins, the motel owner in Centerville.
- Rosal Colon as Lily, a waitress at the local diner.
- Sturgill Simpson as Guitar Zombie
- Jodie Markell as Woman on TV
- Charlotte Kemp Muhl as Fashion Zombie
- Maya Delmont as Stella, an inmate at the Juvenile Detention Center.
- Taliyah Whitaker as Olivia, a fellow inmate at the Juvenile Detention Center.
- Jahi Di'Allo Winston as Geronimo, a fellow inmate at Juvenile Detention Center.
- Tom Waits as Bob "Hermit Bob", a mysterious hermit who oversees Centerville's events play out.
- Jonah Marshall as Zombie Child

== Production ==
In February 2018, during the press tour for Isle of Dogs, Bill Murray and Tilda Swinton announced their involvement in a zombie film directed by Jim Jarmusch.

In March 2018, Murray announced that Daniel Craig and Rosie Perez were set to costar. Speaking of the project, Murray stated:

It's a zombie movie. Jim Jarmusch has written a zombie script that's so hilarious and it has a cast of great actors: Rosie Perez, Daniel Craig. It's titled The Dead Don't Die, and it shoots over the summer. But, no, I will not play a zombie.

In July 2018, it was announced that Adam Driver, Selena Gomez, Chloë Sevigny, Austin Butler, Steve Buscemi, Tilda Swinton, and Caleb Landry Jones had been cast alongside Murray, though Craig did not appear in the film. Joshua Astrachan and Carter Logan produced the movie, while Focus Features distributes.

Filming took place in and around small communities north of New York City, including Ancram, Elizaville, Fleischmanns and Margaretville, New York.

== Release ==
The Dead Don't Die had its world premiere as the opening film at the Cannes Film Festival on May 14, 2019. The film was released in the United States on June 14, 2019 and on July 12, 2019, in the United Kingdom. The studio spent $2–3 million on domestic promotion.

== Reception ==
=== Box office ===
The Dead Don't Die grossed $6.5 million in North America and $8.7 million in other territories for a worldwide total of $15.3 million. In its opening weekend, the film grossed $2.4 million from 613 theaters.

=== Critical response ===
The review aggregator website Rotten Tomatoes reports an approval rating of 54%, based on 318 reviews, with an average rating of 5.8/10. The site's critical consensus reads: "The Dead Don't Die dabbles with tones and themes to varying degrees of success, but sharp wit and a strong cast make this a zom-com with enough brains to consume." Metacritic assigned the film a weighted average score of 53 out of 100, based on 52 critics, indicating "mixed or average reviews".

Alex Leininger of PopMatters wrote "It's a curious film, one that acknowledges the end of the world blatantly without once forgetting to be steadfastly, almost dementedly, silly. It's a smart if minor work from a masterfully innovative director." In a review for The New York Times, A. O. Scott wrote that "The Dead Don't Die respects the horror genre without really committing to it."

Todd McCarthy, writing for The Hollywood Reporter, said of the film "At times, the deadpan of Murray and Driver becomes, well, a bit deadening, and true wit is in short supply, even though the film remains amusing most of the way."

Rotten Tomatoes lists the film on its 100 Best Zombie Movies, Ranked by Tomatometer.

=== Accolades ===
Award	Date of ceremony	Category	Recipient(s)	Result	Ref.
Artios Awards	January 30, 2020	Outstanding Achievement in Casting – Studio or Independent Feature – Comedy	Ellen Lewis; Associate: Kate Sprance	Nominated	
Cannes Film Festival	May 25, 2019	Palme d'Or	Jim Jarmusch	Nominated	
Fangoria Chainsaw Awards	February 7, 2020	Best Makeup FX	Mike Marino	Won	
Hollywood Music in Media Awards	November 20, 2019	Best Original Score in a Horror Film	Sqürl	Nominated	
Saturn Awards	September 13, 2019	Best Horror Film Release	The Dead Don't Die	Nominated	
Saturn Awards	September 13, 2019	Best Film Make-up	Judy Chin and Mike Marino	Nominated	
Teen Choice Awards	August 11, 2019	Choice Summer Movie Actress	Selena Gomez	Nominated	
