= Tashiana Washington =

American singer and actress

- Born: September 11, 1992 (age 33); Queens, New York City, U.S.
- Occupations: Actress; Singer
- Years active: 2004–present

Tashiana Washington (born September 11, 1992) is an American singer, film and television actress. Washington is best known for her role in the award-winning film Gimme the Loot as well as a role in the 2019 sequel Shaft.

In 2013, she starred in Gimme the Loot, for which she received a 2014 Black Reel nomination for Outstanding Breakthrough Actress Performance. Complex magazine named Washington one of the 25 Breakout Actresses to Know in 2013.

== Filmography ==
=== Film ===
Year	TItle	Role	Notes
2011	Gun Hill Road	Girl in High School	
2012	Gimme the Loot	Sophia	
2012	Ice Age: Continental Drift	Additional voices	
2013	Gimme Shelter	Destiny / Princess	
2015	Naomi and Ely's No Kiss List	Tennessee	Uncredited
2015	Straight Outta Compton	Dee Barnes	Uncredited
2016	Tramps	Monica	
2018	Skate Kitchen	Lana	
2018	The Great Pretender	Joyce	
2019	Premature	Jamila	
2019	Shaft	Sugar	

=== Television ===
Year	TItle	Role	Notes
2005	Miracle's Boys	Ellen	3 episodes
2011	Are We There Yet?	Hot Girl	Episode: "The Despicable E Episode"
2011	Sherry's Kitchen	Ginger	Episode: "They Know!"
2011	How to Make It in America	Girl	Episode: "Money, Power, Private School"
2015	The Jim Gaffigan Show	Gigi	Episode: "A Night at the Plaza"
2018	Random Acts of Flyness	Ashley / Vlogger	2 episodes
2019	Critters Attack!	Drea	Television film
2020	Betty	Inmate	Episode: "The Tombs"
2021	Harlem	Ashley	Episode #1.2

== Music ==
=== Charted songs ===
Year	Title	Chart Positions		Album
Year	Title	US	UK	Album
2023	"Soak" featuring Samuel Mancini	-	32	Non-album single
