= Adam Leon =

American filmmaker

Adam Leon is an American film director and writer working in New York City. His first feature film, Gimme the Loot, won the Grand Jury Prize at South by Southwest and premiered internationally at the Cannes Film Festival (Un Certain Regard) in 2012. Leon's second feature, Tramps, premiered at the Toronto International Film Festival in 2016, where Netflix acquired worldwide rights. His newest film, Italian Studies, stars Vanessa Kirby. Leon's films have received critical acclaim.

== Biography ==
Born and raised in Manhattan, Leon attended Hunter College High School and graduated from the University of Pennsylvania. He worked as a production assistant and as a coordinator at various film festivals. During this time, he directed several shorts and music videos, including co-directing and co-writing the short film Killer, which premiered at the New Directors/New Films festival in 2009. The short featured the debut of Ty Hickson who would later co-star in Gimme the Loot.

== Gimme the Loot ==
Leon's debut feature follows the story of two graffiti writers from the Bronx who, over the course of two summer days, attempt to tag the famed Mets Home Run Apple in a bid for glory and revenge on a rival crew. The film received positive reviews, scoring 92% based on review aggregator Rotten Tomatoes with Roger Ebert calling it, “A remarkably natural and unaffected film about friendship” and other notable positive reviews coming from the New York Times, Los Angeles Times, Christian Science Monitor, NPR, Entertainment Weekly, Chicago Tribune, Wall Street Journal, and Chicago Sun-Times. Upon its 2013 theatrical release, the movie was officially “presented” by Oscar-winning filmmaker Jonathan Demme.

== Tramps ==
Leon's second feature film, Tramps, premiered at the Toronto International Film Festival in 2016, where Netflix acquired worldwide rights. Tramps stars Callum Turner and Grace Van Patten and features Mike Birbiglia in a supporting role. It has received critical praise, holding a 95% rating on Rotten Tomatoes as of September 2017.

== Selected awards and honors ==
- 2012 SXSW Grand Jury Award (won)
- 2012 Cannes Film Festival Camera D’or (nominated)
- 2013 Independent Spirit Awards Someone to Watch (won)
- 2013 Independent Spirit Awards Best First Film (nominated)
- 2013 Gotham Awards Best First Feature (nominated)
