= Jahi Di'Allo Winston =

American actor (born 2003)

- Born: November 30, 2003 (age 22); Atlanta, Georgia, U.S.
- Citizenship: American
- Occupation: Actor
- Years active: 2014–present

Jahi Di'Allo Winston (born November 30, 2003) is an American actor known for his work in film, television, and on stage. He gained prominence for roles in films such as The Upside, Proud Mary, The Dead Don't Die, Queen & Slim, Charm City Kings, The Violent Heart, and We Have a Ghost. Winston made his acting debut on Broadway as Young Simba in The Lion King before transitioning to television and film, where he has established himself as a rising talent in Hollywood.

== Early life ==
Jahi Di'Allo Winston was born on November 30, 2003, in Atlanta, Georgia, United States. He is the son of Darryl and Juakena Winston, and grew up in Atlanta alongside his siblings, Sekayi and Jelani.

== Career ==
=== Early stage work ===
Winston began his career in the performing arts when, at the age of 11, he was cast by Walt Disney Theatrical Productions to portray Young Simba in the Broadway musical The Lion King. He performed in this role from December 2014 until March 2016, an experience that marked his transition from stage to screen.

=== Television and film ===
After his Broadway debut, Winston made his television debut in 2016 on the AMC series Feed the Beast, playing the role of Andre in a nine-episode arc. In 2017, he appeared in The New Edition Story as a young Ralph Tresvant and starred in the television film Libby and Malcolm as MJ Black.

Winston's film career expanded with his role as Anthony Scott in Neil Burger's The Upside (2017). In 2018, he appeared in Proud Mary as Danny, further showcasing his range. His subsequent roles include Geronimo in Jim Jarmusch's The Dead Don't Die (2019) and Junior in Queen & Slim (2019). In 2020, he took on the leading role of Mouse in Charm City Kings earning nominations for emerging actor awards from both the NAACP Image Awards and the BET Awards for his performance. Most recently, he starred in the Netflix film We Have a Ghost (2023) as Kevin Presley alongside David Harbour and Anthony Mackie.

In addition to film, Winston continued to work in television. He starred as Luke O'Neil in the Netflix series Everything Sucks! (2018) and made guest appearances on The Resident and The Plug. He is also slated to appear in the upcoming series Government Cheese (2025) as Harrison.

== Filmography ==
=== Film ===
Year	Title	Role	Notes
2017	The Upside	Anthony Scott	
2018	Proud Mary	Danny	
2019	The Dead Don't Die	Geronimo	
2019	Queen & Slim	Junior	
2020	Charm City Kings	Mouse	
2020	The Violent Heart	Aaron	
2023	We Have a Ghost	Kevin Presley	
TBA	Preppy †		Filming

=== Television ===
Year	Title	Role	Notes
2016	Feed the Beast	Andre	9 episodes
2017	The New Edition Story	Young Ralph Tresvant	2 episodes
2017	Libby and Malcolm	MJ Black	Television film
2018	Everything Sucks!	Luke O'Neil	10 episodes
2018	The Resident	Trevor Conforth	1 episode
2018	The Plug	Kendall Burdett	1 episode
2025	Government Cheese		Main role
