= Queen and Country (film) =

2014 British film by John Boorman

- Film poster
- Directed by: John Boorman
- Written by: John Boorman
- Produced by: John Boorman; Kieran Corrigan
- Starring: Caleb Landry Jones; Callum Turner; David Thewlis; Pat Shortt; Brían F. O'Byrne; Tamsin Egerton; Vanessa Kirby; Sinéad Cusack; David Hayman; Richard E. Grant
- Cinematography: Seamus Deasy
- Edited by: Ron Davis
- Music by: Stephen McKeon
- Distributed by: BBC Worldwide
- Release dates: 20 May 2014 (Cannes); 8 May 2015 (United Kingdom)
- Running time: 115 minutes
- Country: United Kingdom
- Language: English
- Box office: $41,297

Queen and Country is a 2014 British drama film written and directed by John Boorman. It was screened at the Directors' Fortnight section of the 2014 Cannes Film Festival. The film is a sequel to Boorman's Hope and Glory (1987), and features several of the same characters, although, because of the passage of time, David Hayman is the only actor from the first film to reprise his role.

== Plot ==
On Pharaoh's Island, Bill is now 18 and receives his call-up papers for national service. Reporting to the army training camp, he quickly makes friends with fellow-conscript Percy. Though most of their intake are sent off to fight in the Korean War, he and Percy are made sergeants and spend their days teaching typing. The bane of their life is Sergeant-Major Bradley, a decorated veteran of World War II who is obsessive about doing things by the book. An ally against Bradley is the orderly Redmond, who teaches them the military arts of "skiving" (evading work). However, Bradley succeeds in getting Bill charged with subverting a private's will to fight by telling him some truths about Korea. The case is thrown out when Bill shows that all he said had been printed in The Times.

Outside the camp, both friends explore what the town offers by way of women. Bill falls for a beautiful but depressive upper-class girl he calls Ophelia, while Percy is smitten by a bubbly student nurse called Sophie (who throws out some lures to Bill as well). On leave for the Coronation of Queen Elizabeth II, Percy steals a car to join Bill, who is with his family on the Island. Both are delighted to find Bill's renegade sister Dawn, who has returned from Canada, and Dawn is soon charming Percy. Ophelia makes a brief visit but has to dash back into London. On the television, the family spot her in Westminster Abbey as one of the nobility, something which Bill did not know. Back in camp, Bill gets word that Ophelia is again in hospital with mental problems and, when he visits her, she rejects him callously. Shocked and in tears, he is found by Sophie, who leads him to an empty room and takes his virginity. Percy then confides that he lost his to Dawn.

Percy finds military life a strain and with Redmond concocts an absurd scheme to steal the mess clock; a gift to the Regiment from Queen Victoria. An investigation pinpoints his guilt, upon which Redmond betrays him. A court martial sentences him to military prison and Bill is allowed to escort him there in handcuffs. Dawn jumps on the train and says she will wait for him. Bill then goes to visit Bradley, who has cracked under the strain of Percy's persecution and is in a military hospital on mental grounds but Bradley rejects him. In a ward he meets Private Henderson, one of the soldiers from his typing class, who has lost a foot in Korea. Back on the Island, Sophie is in the river acting while Bill with a new film camera is filming her. Leaving the camera running, he jumps in to embrace her.

== Cast ==
- Callum Turner as Bill Rohan
- Vanessa Kirby as Dawn Rohan
- David Thewlis as Bradley
- Richard E. Grant as Major Cross
- Caleb Landry Jones as Percy Hapgood
- Tamsin Egerton as Ophelia
- Sinéad Cusack as Grace Rohan
- David Hayman as Clive Rohan
- Brían F. O'Byrne as RSM Digby
- Pat Shortt as Redmond
- John Standing as George
- Aimee-Ffion Edwards as Sophie Adams
- David Michael Claydon as Jones

== Themes ==
According to the director, though primarily a coming of age film, it also aimed to be a state of Britain film, capturing some of the great changes the country was undergoing. The film is semi-autobiographical.

== Reception ==
On Rotten Tomatoes the film holds a 77% rating based on 91 reviews, with an average of 6.80/10. The website's critics consensus reads: "Graceful and bittersweet, Queen and Country finds writer-director John Boorman revisiting past glories with warmth and wisdom." Audiences surveyed by CinemaScore gave the film an average grade of "B" on an A+ to F scale. Variety stated in its review that "it remains a pleasure to spend time in the presence of these characters, and a third volume – perhaps focused on Bill’s entrance into the British film industry – would hardly be unwelcome."

== Release ==
The film made its debut as part of the Directors' Fortnight section of the 2014 Cannes Film Festival. It was scheduled to be released in the United Kingdom in May 2015.
