= John C. Egan =

American pilot (1915–1961)

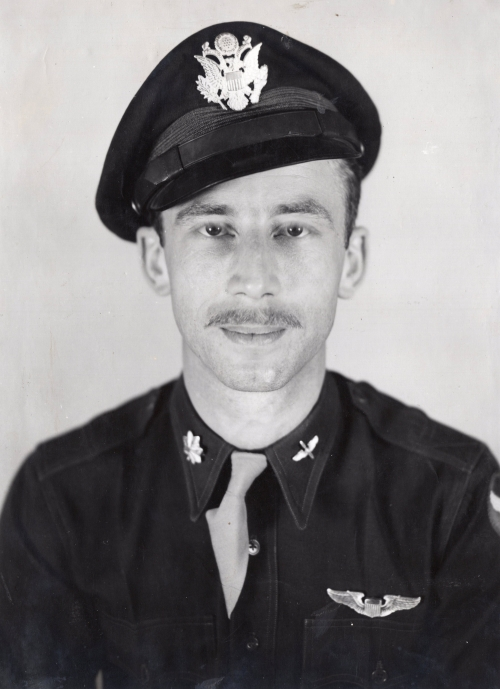
- Born: September 9, 1915; Manitowoc, Wisconsin, U.S.
- Died: April 16, 1961 (aged 45); McLean, Virginia, U.S.
- Burial place: Arlington National Cemetery
- Spouse: Josephine Pitz Egan (m. 1946)
- Children: 2
- Military career
- Allegiance: United States
- Branch: United States Army Air Forces; United States Air Force
- Service years: 1940–1961
- Rank: Colonel
- Nickname: Bucky
- Service number: O-399510
- Unit: 100th Bombardment Group (Heavy)
- Commands: 47th Reconnaissance Group
- Conflicts: World War II; Korean War
- Awards: Distinguished Flying Cross; Legion of Merit; Purple Heart; Air Medal (4)

John Clarence "Bucky" Egan (September 9, 1915 – April 16, 1961) was an American pilot who served with the 100th Bomb Group of the United States Army Air Forces during World War II and later with the United States Air Force in the Korean War.

== Early life and military career ==
Born in Manitowoc, Wisconsin, Egan attended school there and later went on to St. Thomas College in St. Paul, Minnesota.

After the outbreak of World War II, Egan enlisted in the Air Corps in 1940, receiving flight training at Randolph and Kelly Fields, Texas. After serving as an instructor at Randolph Field, he was assigned to the 100th Bomb Group for overseas service in 1942. Initially a group operations officer, he rose to the rank of major and took command of the group's 418th Bomb Squadron in June 1943. In August 1943, he recounted that he carried two rosaries, two good luck medals and a $2 bill that he would chew off a corner for each mission, while recounting the Regensburg raid to United Press.

On October 10, 1943, Egan's plane was shot down during a raid on Münster, Germany. He survived and was captured after evading capture for four days, and held as a prisoner of war until May 1945. In June 1946, he was promoted to the permanent rank of lieutenant colonel.

At the beginning of the Korean War, Egan was in command of the 47th Reconnaissance Group and was promoted to colonel in 1951. He flew several air support missions against Chinese and North Korean ground forces in an A-26 Invader.

After the war, he served as deputy chief of staff for operations of the Fifth Air Force in Japan before being appointed director of operations for the Pacific Air Force in Hawaii in 1956. In 1958, he was assigned to The Pentagon in Washington, D.C.

== Personal life ==
During flight school he gave the nickname Buck to fellow airman and best friend Gale "Buck" Cleven, as Cleven reminded him of a Wisconsin friend named Buck.

In 1945, Egan was engaged to the former Josephine Pitz, also of Manitowoc, and they married on December 26, 1946. Pitz was the first female pilot to be licensed in Manitowoc in 1930 and served for twenty-one months as a Women Airforce Service Pilot during World War II.

John C. Egan died on April 16, 1961, while on active duty after suffering a heart attack at his home in McLean, Virginia. He was survived by his wife, two daughters, two sisters, and his mother; his father preceded him in death. In 1962, he was posthumously awarded the Legion of Merit.

== In popular culture ==
Egan is portrayed by British actor Callum Turner in Apple TV+'s miniseries Masters of the Air.

== Awards and honors ==
His awards include:

USAF Command pilot badge
Legion of Merit
Distinguished Flying Cross
Purple Heart
Air Medal with three bronze oak leaf clusters
Army Commendation Medal with two bronze oak leaf clusters
Air Force Presidential Unit Citation with bronze oak leaf cluster
Prisoner of War Medal
American Defense Service Medal
American Campaign Medal with bronze service star
European-African-Middle Eastern Campaign Medal with two bronze campaign stars
World War II Victory Medal
National Defense Service Medal
Korean Service Medal with bronze campaign star
Air Force Longevity Service Award with four bronze oak leaf clusters
United Nations Service Medal for Korea
