= Joshua Astrachan =

American film producer

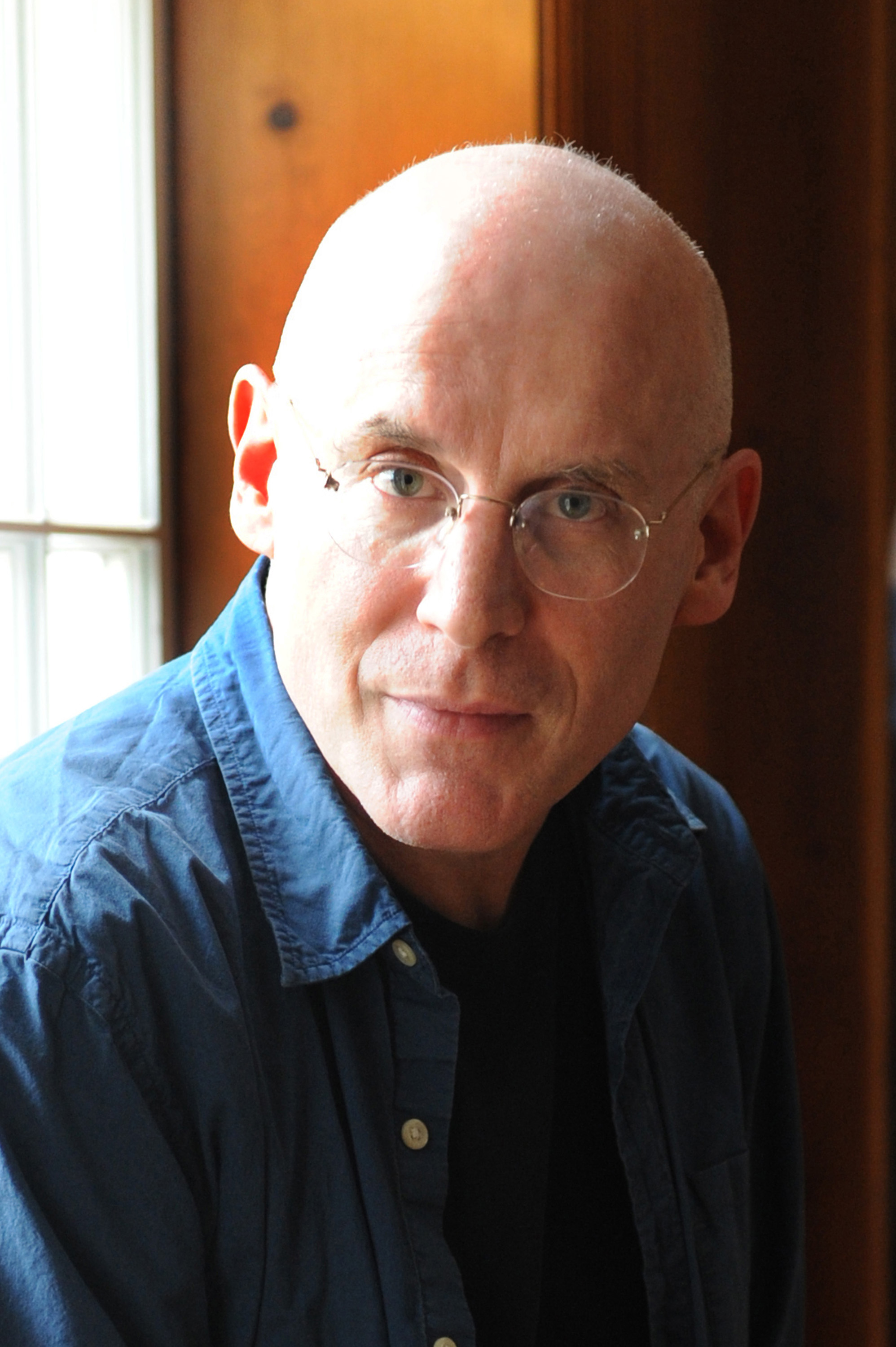
- Astrachan in 2011
- Born: United States
- Occupation: Film producer

Joshua Astrachan is an American film producer and principal at Animal Kingdom, the production company he co-founded in 2012. He lives and works in New York City.

== Career ==
The first film that Astrachan produced under the Animal Kingdom banner was Short Term 12 by writer/director Destin Daniel Cretton. The film stars Brie Larson, John Gallagher Jr., Kaitlyn Dever, Rami Malek and Lakeith Stanfield – and premiered at SXSW in 2013, where it was awarded the Grand Jury Prize and the Audience Award for Best Narrative Feature. The film subsequently won awards at festivals from Little Rock to Los Angeles to Locarno – where the film had its international premiere.

With Animal Kingdom, Astrachan has also produced Jim Jarmusch’s Paterson (Cannes Official Selection, 2016), Adam Leon’s Tramps (Toronto International Film Festival, 2016), Joachim Trier’s English-language feature debut, Louder Than Bombs (Cannes Official Selection 2015), and Justin Tipping’s debut feature, Kicks. He executive produced David Robert Mitchell’s It Follows (Critics’ Week, Cannes 2014); and Trespass Against Us, starring Michael Fassbender and Brendan Gleeson, written by Alastair Siddons and directed by Adam Smith.

Prior to founding Animal Kingdom, Astrachan was a producer for the American film director, Robert Altman for the better part of a decade. He produced Altman's last film, A Prairie Home Companion (2006), written by Garrison Keillor and starring Meryl Streep, Lily Tomlin, John C. Reilly, Woody Harrelson and Kevin Kline. He also produced The Company, Altman's narrative feature set in the world of dance, starring Neve Campbell, James Franco, Malcolm McDowell and the company members of the Joffrey Ballet of Chicago. Astrachan co-produced the film Gosford Park starring, among others, Maggie Smith, Clive Owen, Kelly Macdonald, Kristin Scott Thomas, Jeremy Northam, Emily Watson and Bob Balaban. For Gosford Park, Altman received the Golden Globe and New York Film Critics Circle Award as Best Director.

Astrachan also produced Jennifer Westfeldt’s Friends with Kids (Toronto International Film Festival 2011), starring Westfeldt, Adam Scott, Jon Hamm, Kristen Wiig, Chris O’Dowd, Maya Rudolph, Megan Fox and Edward Burns. The film was named by New York Magazine's film critic, David Edelstein, as one of the 10 best films of 2012.

== Personal life ==
Astrachan is the brother of computer scientist Owen Astrachan who is a professor at Duke University.

== Filmography ==
- Ed's Next Move (1996)
- Doctor T and the Women (2000)
- Gosford Park (2001)
- The Company (2003)
- A Prairie Home Companion (2006)
- Frontrunners (2008)
- Friends with Kids (2011)
- That's What She Said (2012)
- Short Term 12 (2013)
- It Follows (2014)
- Partisan (2015)
- Louder Than Bombs (2015)
- Kicks (2016)
- Paterson (2016)
- Trespass Against Us (2015)
- Tramps (2016)
- All About Nina (2018)
- The Dead Don't Die (2019)
- Master (2022)
