= Government Cheese (TV series) =

American comedy drama

- Promotional poster
- Genre: Comedy drama
- Created by: Paul Hunter; Aeysha Carr
- Starring: David Oyelowo; Simone Missick; Jahi Di'Allo Watson; Evan Ellison; Bokeem Woodbine
- Theme music composer: Pharrell Williams
- Country of origin: United States
- Original language: English
- No. of seasons: 1
- No. of episodes: 10

Production
- Executive producers: Paul Hunter; Aeysha Carr; David Oyelowo; Jessica Oyelowo; Charles D. King; Ali Brown; Ahmadou Seck; Jelani Johnson; Marta Fernandez
- Cinematography: Matthew J. Lloyd
- Production companies: Street Carr Productions; Yoruba Saxon; Ventureland; MACRO Television Studios; Apple Studios

Original release
- Network: Apple TV+
- Release: April 16 – May 28, 2025

Government Cheese is a historical surrealist comedy drama television series created by Paul Hunter and Aeysha Carr and starring David Oyelowo, Simone Missick, Bokeem Woodbine, Adam Beach, and Sunita Mani. Set in 1969, the series follows the Chambers family, an African American family living in the San Fernando Valley, and the chaos that arises after burglar-turned-inventor Hampton Chambers returns from prison. Government Cheese premiered on April 16, 2025, on Apple TV+.

== Premise ==
In 1969, Hampton Chambers, a convicted burglar, is released from prison and returns to his home in Chatsworth, Los Angeles, where he reunites with his family and tries to start over with a second chance by inventing the "Bit Magician", a self-sharpening power drill. However, the unconventional structure of the Chambers family formed in his absence, moments from his past, run-ins with shady and dangerous figures, and even instances of seeming divine intervention complicate matters.

== Cast ==
=== Main ===
- David Oyelowo as Hampton Chambers
- Simone Missick as Astoria Chambers
- Jahi Di'Allo Winston as Harrison Chambers
- Evan Ellison as Einstein Chambers
- Bokeem Woodbine as Bootsy

=== Guest ===
- Jeremy Bobb as Manny Brinks
- Louis Cancelmi as Jean-Guy Prevost
- Julien Heron as Patrice Prevost
- Christopher Redman as Nicholi Redman
- Djilali Rez-Kallah as Claude Prevost
- Louis Ferreira
- John Ortiz as Todd Edelbrock
- Adam Beach as Rudy
- Sunita Mani as Edith
- Stephen Schneider as Ronald
- Dan Donohue as Dean Dremel

== Episodes ==
No.	Title	Directed by	Written by	Original release date
1	"The Gospel of Kenny Sharp"	Paul Hunter	Paul Hunter & Aeysha Carr	April 16, 2025
2	"Trial and Error"	Paul Hunter	Paul Hunter & Aeysha Carr	April 16, 2025
3	"Two Doors"	Colin Bucksey	Paul Hunter & Aeysha Carr	April 16, 2025
4	"A Long Road Home"	Colin Bucksey	Hugh Moore	April 16, 2025
5	"Father Facts, Figures, and Failures"	Paul Hunter	Wes Brown	April 23, 2025
6	"Parable of Drawing in the Net"	Paul Hunter	Migizi Pensoneau	April 30, 2025
7	"The Woman on the Roof"	Stacie Passon	Katherine Kearns & Cece Burke	May 7, 2025
8	"An Evening with Abraham Cohen"	Stacie Passon	Katherine Kearns	May 14, 2025
9	"R&D"	Sylvain White	Wes Brown & Hugh Moore	May 21, 2025
10	"St. Hampton"	Sylvain White	Paul Hunter & Aeysha Carr and Migizi Pensoneau	May 28, 2025

== Production ==
=== Development ===
It was announced in June 2022 that Apple TV+ was nearing a deal to order the series, which would see David Oyelowo star in and executive produce.

=== Casting ===
The deal for the series was closed by December 2023, when Oyelowo and his production company Yoruba Saxon signed a first-look deal with Apple, and Simone Missick would be cast. In April 2024, Bokeem Woodbine, Adam Beach and Sunita Mani would be among additional castings announced.

=== Filming ===
Filming began in May 2024 under the working title Bonneville in Los Angeles.

== Reception ==
=== Critical response ===
The series holds a 73% approval rating on review aggregator Rotten Tomatoes, based on 30 critic reviews. The website's critics consensus reads, "Peculiar and peppy, Government Cheese has some holes but gets by on the strength of its nutty writing and a collection of tangy performances." On Metacritic, the series holds a weighted average score of 63/100, based on 16 critics, indicating "generally favorable" reviews.
