= Soak (Samuel Mancini song) =

2023 single by Samuel Mancini and Tashi

"SOAK"

Single by Samuel Mancini and Tashi
- Released: August 4, 2023
- Genre: R&B
- Length: 3:22
- Label: Eric West Management Group; AWAL
- Songwriters: Samuel Mancini; Joseph Robert Stanley Allen; Francisco Alfonso Santa Rosa Neto; Tashiana Washington
- Producers: II XII; Samuel Mancini; Francci; Eric West

"Soak" (stylized in all uppercase) is a duet between American singers Samuel Mancini and Tashi. Eric West Management Group/AWAL released it on August 4, 2023, as the lead single from his upcoming debut studio album.

Commercially, “Soak” entered the Top 50 of the UK Single Sales Chart at #45 on August 11, 2023, becoming their first chart hit in the UK. On August 15, 2023 "Soak" debuted at the #7 on the Billboard R&B Digital Song Sales Chart, becoming their first top ten hit in the US. "Soak" also debuted at the #19 on the Billboard R&B/Hip-Hop Digital Song Sales Chart. On August 18, 2023 "Soak" moved up to the #40 on the Official Singles Downloads Chart becoming their first UK Top 40 hit. On August 25, 2023 "Soak" moved up to the #32 on the Official UK Downloads Chart.

== Reception ==
That Grape Juice praised the single:

Rising music superstar Samuel Mancini is back with his first new single of the year. Entitled ‘Soak,’ the song features Tashi, who appears in Amazon’s ‘Harlem.’ Featuring skittering trap proaction and a pulsating beat, the song exudes sexual tension and includes plenty of vocal interplay. One of his most daring releases to date, Samuel continues to prove why he is the R&B’s next big star.

== Charts ==
Chart (2023)	Peak position
UK Singles Downloads (OCC)	32
