= Proud Mary (film) =

2018 American action thriller film by Babak Najafi

- Theatrical release poster
- Directed by: Babak Najafi
- Screenplay by: John S. Newman; Christian Swegal; Steve Antin
- Story by: John S. Newman; Christian Swegal
- Produced by: Tai Duncan; Mark Anthony Little; Paul Schiff
- Starring: Taraji P. Henson; Jahi Di'Allo Winston; Billy Brown; Danny Glover
- Cinematography: Dan Laustsen
- Edited by: Evan Schiff
- Music by: Fil Eisler
- Production companies: Screen Gems; Paul Schiff Productions
- Distributed by: Sony Pictures Releasing
- Release date: January 12, 2018
- Running time: 88 minutes
- Country: United States
- Language: English
- Budget: $14–30 million
- Box office: $21.8 million

Proud Mary is a 2018 American action thriller film directed by Babak Najafi, from a screenplay written by John S. Newman, Christian Swegal, and Steve Antin. The film stars Taraji P. Henson, Jahi Di'Allo Winston, Billy Brown, and Danny Glover. It follows a female assassin who experiences guilty feelings and starts looking after a young teenaged boy orphaned by one of her hit jobs.

Proud Mary was released on January 12, 2018, by Screen Gems, which was also the film's production company. The film received negative reviews from critics and grossed $21 million against a production budget of $14–30 million.

== Plot ==
In Boston, assassin Mary Goodwin kills her target Marcus Miller in his apartment. Before leaving, she notices Marcus’ young son Danny in his room, oblivious to her presence. A year later, Danny – unaware Mary has been keeping an eye on him – is working for a drug dealer who calls himself Uncle. When a customer, Jerome, tries to short him, Danny pulls a gun and takes the full payment plus a premium. He buys himself food and delivers the money to Uncle, who beats him for taking a portion of the extra money. Dazed, Danny rests on a bench, but a man steals his bag, forcing Danny to chase him and fire in the air. The thief drops the bag, but Danny faints and is found by Mary.

Danny awakens in Mary's home, and she offers him food and first aid. Noticing the marks from Uncle's abuse, Mary confronts the dealer, but she is forced to kill Uncle and his men. Leaving Danny at her apartment, Mary attends a meeting with her associates Tom, Walter, and their employer, mob boss Benny Spencer. They meet with Luka, who is Uncle's uncle and head of a rival mob, and assure him that they had nothing to do with Uncle's death. Mary encourages Benny's suspicion that Walter was responsible for eliminating Uncle and his crew, and Benny instructs her to kill Walter. Discovering Mary's cache of guns, Danny opens up to Mary about his life, unaware she is his father's killer.

Mary follows Walter on his routine jog and kills him. Luka sends his men to ambush Benny, killing several members of his crew. Determined to retaliate, Tom – Benny's son and Mary's ex-boyfriend – visits Mary's apartment and questions Danny. Tom tortures one of Luka's men, learning of an upcoming meeting of Luka and his crew, and Benny invites Mary to bring Danny to his wife Mina's birthday dinner. Buying Danny new clothes, Mary tells him about her similar childhood and coaches him on what to say to Benny, warning that he is not to be trusted. At the dinner, Mary tells Benny that she wants to leave her criminal life behind, and Tom confronts her, having deduced that Danny is Marcus’ son.

Mary tells Danny to start a new life elsewhere with her stash of money, should anything happen to her. Before Tom and Mary storm Luka's hideout, he warns her that Benny will not let her leave his crew alive as she knows too much. The two kill Luka's entire crew, but Mary is wounded in the attack and they fail to find Luka. Refusing Tom's help, Mary returns home and tells a shaken Danny that Benny will never release her. Danny goes to Benny's office – where he is spotted by Jerome, who works for Benny – and demands that Mary be allowed to move on, holding Benny at gunpoint. Having learned Danny's true identity from Tom, Benny tells Danny the truth about his father's death and takes the gun, but Mary appears. Sending Danny away, she pleads with Benny to let her go, but he refuses, declaring that she must train Danny as an assassin. Mary kills Benny and escapes unseen.

Tom learns from Jerome that Danny was the last person seen with Benny. Mary finds Danny and shares her remorse for his father's death, promising to keep him safe. While Mary returns to her apartment, Danny is captured by Tom's men and brought to him. He confirms that Mary killed his father and informs her that he has Danny. She arrives to save him, single-handedly killing all his men. Having freed Danny, she finds herself in a standoff with Tom. When Mary walks away, Tom fires at her but she shoots him in the chest and finishes him off with a bullet to the head. Outside, Mary reunites with Danny; as the credits roll, they drive away to a new life together.

== Cast ==
- Taraji P. Henson as Mary Goodwin
- Jahi Di'Allo Winston as Danny
- Billy Brown as Tom Spencer
- Danny Glover as Benny Spencer
- Xander Berkeley as Uncle
- Neal McDonough as Walter
- Margaret Avery as Mina
- Rade Šerbedžija as Luka
- Erik LaRay Harvey as Reggie

== Production ==
In January 2017, Taraji P. Henson signed on to star in Proud Mary with Screen Gems still looking to secure a director for an April 2017 principal production start in Boston. In February 2017, the film received a January 26, 2018, release date and Babak Najafi signed on to direct.

On April 5, 2017, the rest of the cast was announced as the film commenced principal production. On July 20, 2017, the first official trailer for the film was released along with a teaser poster. A new release date of January 12, 2018, was also confirmed.

== Release ==
The film was released on January 12, 2018, by Screen Gems.

=== Home media ===
Proud Mary was released on Digital HD on March 27, 2018, and on DVD and Blu-ray on April 10, 2018, by Sony Pictures Home Entertainment.

=== Box office ===
In the United States and Canada, Proud Mary was released on January 12, 2018, alongside The Commuter and Paddington 2, as well as the wide expansion of The Post, and was projected to gross around $20 million from 2,125 theaters in opening weekend. It made $3.2 million on its first day and $10 million over the weekend, finishing 8th at the box office and last among the new releases.

=== Critical response ===
On the review aggregator website Rotten Tomatoes, 25% of 76 critics' reviews are positive, with an average rating of 4.2/10. The website's consensus reads: "Proud Mary proves Taraji P. Henson has more than enough attitude and charisma to carry an action movie—just not, unfortunately, one this indifferently assembled." Metacritic, which uses a weighted average, assigned the film a score of 35 out of 100, based on 23 critics, indicating "generally unfavorable" reviews. Audiences polled by CinemaScore gave the film an average grade of "B+" on an A+ to F scale.

Odie Henderson of RogerEbert.com praised Henson's portrayal as the title character and the performances from Winston, Brown and Glover, but criticized the production for supplying the film with "awful cinematography" for the actors and "problematic" editing in both the action and dramatic scenes, concluding that: "I am giving a mild thumbs down here, but if you're a fan of Ms. Henson, don't let me stop you from seeing this. Hell, if you make it a hit, perhaps Screen Gems will do its damn job next time." Glenn Kenny of The New York Times also praised Henson for her subtle delivery of the titular character but felt the script doesn't give her enough material to fully display her actions. Devan Coggan of Entertainment Weekly gave the film an overall C+ grade, calling it a "paint-by-numbers B-movie" that's occasionally elevated by Henson bringing "haunted intensity" to her title role, saying that "Proud Mary could've been an enjoyable guilty pleasure [...] but its stale script and baffling directorial choices hold it back." Rolling Stone's Peter Travers criticized Najafi's direction of a "rote script" that lacks emotional connection between its characters and bringing nothing new to the "reformed menace trope" done better in Gloria and Léon: The Professional, concluding that: "It's one thing to watch Henson's Mary shoot her way out of a world of trigger-happy male oppressors. It's another to watch her continually get shot down by a movie that's not worth her time – or yours. It should be ashamed of itself."

== See also ==
- List of black films of the 2010s
