= Tramps (2016 film) =

2016 film by Adam Leon

- Official release poster
- Directed by: Adam Leon
- Written by: Adam Leon
- Produced by: Joshua Astrachan; David Kaplan; Andrea Roa; Jamund Washington
- Starring: Callum Turner; Grace Van Patten
- Cinematography: Ashley Connor
- Edited by: Morgan Faust; Sara Shaw
- Music by: Nicholas Britell
- Production companies: Animal Kingdom; Rooks Nest Entertainment
- Distributed by: Netflix
- Release dates: September 10, 2016 (TIFF); April 21, 2017 (United States)
- Running time: 83 minutes
- Country: United States
- Language: English

Tramps is a 2016 American romantic comedy film directed by Adam Leon and starring Callum Turner and Grace Van Patten. It was screened in the Contemporary World Cinema section at the 2016 Toronto International Film Festival. It was released on April 21, 2017, by Netflix.

== Plot ==
Danny is a young Polish-American living in New York City, who is asked by his briefly jailed brother, Darren, to deliver a briefcase. He is not told about the briefcase’s contents and the abruptly terminated jailhouse call leaves him with vague instructions for its delivery. Ellie is being paid by Darren's employer to be Danny's driver. She needs the money to have a fresh start at life.

At the designated subway station, Danny exchanges the briefcase against the bag of a female passenger sitting on a bench and roughly fitting the description. He only notices his mistake when his train is pulling off. When he makes it back to the station, the woman and the case are gone. He runs across Ellie, but she tries to avoid him until she realises that neither of them will get paid. They decide to work together to rectify the situation. Ellie calls her contact, promising delivery and demanding equal pay. Her contact agrees to pay her Danny's share.

Danny and Ellie take a train to an address in the suburbs they found on a prescription bottle in the female passenger's bag. As they travel there, Danny tries to start a conversation. She joins in and they talk about their respective jobs. Arriving at the address, a teenage girl lets them in, mistaking them for somebody else. They enter, looking around for the woman from the platform. They abandon their search when they see the SUV of a man who had threatened to call the police earlier.

Deciding to go back the next day, Danny and Ellie wander around the nearby town. They go to a carnival, and Ellie starts to ask Danny questions. They spend the night in a pool shed, cuddling for warmth. In the morning, when the family has left, Danny and Ellie sneak back into the house. Danny sees the woman from the platform in a photograph, and finds her name (Vinessa) and work address on a desktop computer. They find some food and clothes, and leave the house using bikes they found in the garage.

Back in the city, Danny and Ellie see Vinessa go to her work, so he makes a call to Darren. Darren appears along with his associates, and talks Vinessa into leaving her workplace with the briefcase. Danny intercepts her and switches their cases back. He calls Darren again, who tries to get him to take the case and run. Danny instead gives it to Ellie, who is picked up and taken to a luxurious home. The home's owner is happy to receive the briefcase, as it contains a piece of art her ex-husband had insisted on keeping for himself in their divorce. For handing over the briefcase, Ellie is given $3,000, which she gives a cut of to Danny.

Ellie heads to the Port Authority to catch a bus to Pittsburgh. After a few minutes of reflecting, Danny grabs some things and chases after her. Catching up to her, Ellie tells him that she is going to Providence. Danny asks if he can come with her, she agrees.

== Cast ==
- Callum Turner as Danny
- Grace Van Patten as Ellie
- Michal Vondel as Darren
- Mike Birbiglia as Scott
- Louis Cancelmi as Jimmy
- Margaret Colin as Evelyn
- Mariola Mlekicki as Ola
- Tashiana Washington as Monica
- Rachel Zeiger-Haag as Vinessa

== Production ==
Filming was completed in 2015.

== Release ==
In September 2016, Netflix acquired worldwide distribution rights to the film. It was released on April 21, 2017.

=== Critical response ===
On the review aggregator website Rotten Tomatoes, 96% of 23 critics' reviews are positive, with an average rating of 7.2/10. The website's consensus reads: "Sweet, breezy, and unexpected, Tramps traipses through its romcom premise with earnestness and ease." On Metacritic, which assigns a normalized rating, the film has a score 76 out of 100, based on 11 critics, indicating "generally favorable reviews".
