= We Have a Ghost =

2023 American film by Christopher Landon

- Official release poster
- Directed by: Christopher Landon
- Screenplay by: Christopher Landon
- Based on: "Ernest" by Geoff Manaugh
- Produced by: Marty Bowen; Dan Halsted
- Starring: David Harbour; Jahi Winston; Anthony Mackie
- Cinematography: Marc Spicer
- Edited by: Ben Baudhuin
- Music by: Bear McCreary
- Production companies: Temple Hill Entertainment; Halsted Pictures
- Distributed by: Netflix
- Release date: February 24, 2023
- Running time: 127 minutes
- Country: United States
- Language: English
- Budget: $51 million

We Have a Ghost is 2023 American supernatural horror comedy film written and directed by Christopher Landon, based on the 2017 short story "Ernest" by Geoff Manaugh. It stars David Harbour, Jahi Winston, Tig Notaro, Jennifer Coolidge, and Anthony Mackie. It was released on February 24, 2023, by Netflix and received mixed reviews from film critics.

== Plot ==
The Presleys purchase a large, cheap and abandoned house. Kevin, the youngest, discovers a ghost in the attic, who has been scaring off other intruders, and records a video of him. The next day, he talks to the ghost, who turns out to be mute and does not remember his past life. The ghost's bowling shirt says 'Ernest', so Kevin calls him Ernest. Kevin is resolved to help Ernest discover his past, hoping it will help him find peace and crossover. Kevin's father, Frank – who has already ruined the family finances with failed get-rich-quick schemes, betrays Kevin and Ernest, publishing the video on YouTube to make money.

At high school Kevin teams up with his neighbor Joy. They discover a photo of Ernest posing with an Ernest Scheller, the previous house owner. Ernest has flashbacks of having a daughter. Frank continues to ignore Kevin's concerns, doing everything possible to make money off Ernest, including selling the story to a ghost hunter television show.

Horror writer Dr. Leslie Monroe, who previously ran a CIA program for capturing ghosts, breaks into the Presley home to capture Ernest alongside several FBI agents, but Kevin, Joy and Ernest have already left to find Scheller in Oklahoma. Monroe gets the trio registered as fugitives, and the kids' lives are put in danger in various police pursuits. The trio find Scheller, who identifies the ghost as Randy, his wife's sister's husband. He claims that after Randy's wife died, Randy left his daughter June with Scheller and disappeared. The CIA arrive in Oklahoma, forcibly arrest the kids, and capture Randy with a tortuous weapon.

Frank finally apologises to Kevin for using Randy, for risking Kevin's life, and being a terrible father. While in captivity, Randy has a flashback of being killed by Scheller. Dr. Monroe has a change of heart and frees Randy. Meanwhile, Scheller arrives at the house to kill Kevin, believing Kevin knew what he did and was trying to avenge Randy's murder. Scheller reveals that his wife was infertile and ordered him to murder Randy so they could take June for their own. Scheller attacks Frank, shoots at Kevin's mother and brother, then attacks Kevin in the attic. Randy arrives just in time to save him. With Scheller about to pull the trigger to kill Kevin, Frank arrives and knocks the murderer out the window, to his death. Kevin and Frank reunite Randy with a grown up June, and Randy moves on to the afterlife after a heartwarming goodbye with Kevin.

Kevin and Joy are now a couple and the Presleys are preparing to move, to a house just five miles away. Before leaving, Kevin and Joy are talking in the attic and he asks if she thinks Randy can still see them from wherever he is. After they leave the attic, a light flickers; possibly Randy’s way of saying he can and good-bye/thank you.

== Cast ==
- Anthony Mackie as Frank Presley
- David Harbour as "Ernest" / Randy
- Jahi Di'Allo Winston as Kevin Presley (as Jahi Winston)
- Tig Notaro as Dr. Leslie Monroe
- Erica Ash as Melanie Presley
- Jennifer Coolidge as Judy Romano
- Faith Ford as Barbara Mangold
- Niles Fitch as Fulton Presley
- Isabella Russo as Joy Yoshino
- Scott A Martin as Sheriff Brown
- Steve Coulter as Deputy Director Arnold Schipley
- Jo-Ann Robinson as June
- Tom Bower as Ernest Scheller

In addition, Bob the Drag Queen and Dr. Phil McGraw have cameo appearances as themselves.

== Production ==
Production of We Have a Ghost was announced in July 2021, with Christopher Landon writing and directing, and Geoff Manaugh, on whose short story it was based, as executive producer. The cast included Anthony Mackie, David Harbour, Jahi Winston, Tig Notaro, Jennifer Coolidge, Erica Ash, Niles Fitch, Isabella Russo, Faith Ford and Steve Coulter. Harbour was Landon's first choice for the role of Ernest; as he told Entertainment Weekly: "I knew that the role was incredibly challenging because there's no dialog, so he just has to do so much with so little. We had a meeting, and he told me he was terrified of doing it, which I thought was great because it shows that he was feeling vulnerable and intrigued and excited. By the end of our meeting, I think we both felt really strongly that it was a good match".

Principal photography began in August 2021 in Donaldsonville and New Orleans. A few weeks into filming, production was halted because of the landfall of Hurricane Ida in Louisiana. Production resumed October to finish filming scenes in the Ascension Parish west bank city.

== Reception ==
On the review aggregator website Rotten Tomatoes, 42% of 73 critics' reviews are positive, with an average rating of 5.1/10. The website's consensus reads: "We Have a Ghost has a fun concept and a talented cast; unfortunately, this spookily uneven '80s pastiche also has very little idea of what to do with them." Metacritic, which uses a weighted average, assigned the film a score of 53 out of 100, based on 23 critics, indicating "mixed or average" reviews.

=== Accolades ===
Year	Awards	Category	Recipient	Result	Ref.
2023	Australian Cinematographers Society	Feature Films - Budget $3m and Over	We Have a Ghost	Won	
2024	Australian Cinematographers Society	Feature Film	We Have a Ghost	Won	
