= Grace Van Patten =

American actress (born 1996)

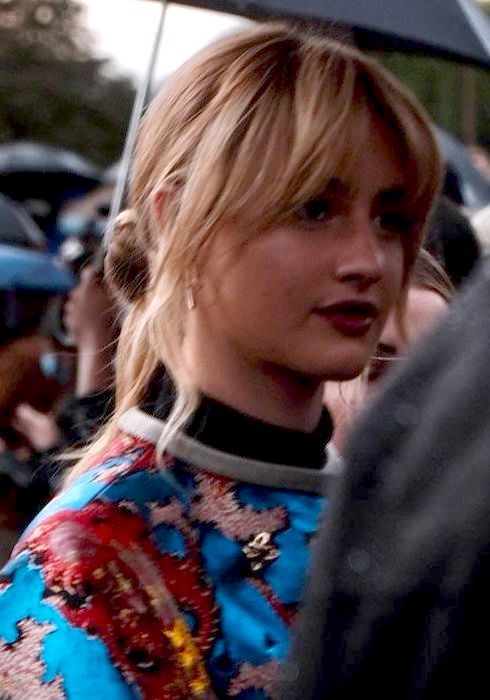
- Van Patten in 2021
- Born: November 21, 1996 (age 29); New York City, U.S.
- Occupation: Actress
- Years active: 2006–present
- Father: Tim Van Patten
- Relatives: Dick Van Patten (uncle); Joyce Van Patten (aunt); Vincent Van Patten (cousin); Talia Balsam (cousin); Anna Van Patten (sister)

Grace Van Patten (born November 21, 1996) is an American actress. She has appeared in two films distributed by Netflix, Tramps (2016) and The Meyerowitz Stories (2017), and in the Hulu original series Nine Perfect Strangers (2021), Tell Me Lies (2022), and The Twisted Tale of Amanda Knox (2025).

== Early life ==
Van Patten grew up in Tribeca, New York City, and attended Fiorello H. LaGuardia High School. She is the eldest of three daughters of director and producer Timothy Van Patten. She is the niece of comic actor Dick Van Patten. Her cousin (born in 1959) is actress Talia Balsam, who is the daughter of Joyce Van Patten.

== Career ==
At the age of eight, Van Patten's first role was on the crime drama television series The Sopranos, that her father directed. He got her the audition, and she portrayed Ally, the daughter of a gangster Eugene Pontecorvo. She was in a 2014 episode of another series directed by her father, Boardwalk Empire. She deferred admission to the University of Southern California, instead choosing to audition in New York City and take community college classes in psychology and philosophy. She postponed the courses, however, when she got a job during the school year.

Van Patten played Ellie in her first feature film, the Netflix romantic comedy Tramps, which premiered at the 2016 Toronto International Film Festival. She had a small part in crime drama Stealing Cars and starred in the 2017 horror thriller Central Park. In the comedy-drama film The Meyerowitz Stories (New and Selected), Van Patten portrayed Eliza, a Bard College film student and the daughter of Adam Sandler's character, Danny. In the film, directed by Noah Baumbach and screened at the 2017 Cannes Film Festival, Eliza makes sexually explicit shorts starring herself.

In her theater debut, Van Patten performed in The New Group's Off-Broadway play The Whirligig by Hamish Linklater alongside Zosia Mamet at the Pershing Square Signature Center. Van Patten acted in the 2017 romantic comedy The Wilde Wedding with Glenn Close, John Malkovich, Patrick Stewart, and Minnie Driver. Principal photography of Dolly Wells' Good Posture, starring Van Patten and Emily Mortimer, finished in Brooklyn in late December 2017.

She appeared in David Robert Mitchell's crime noir Under the Silver Lake with Mamet, Riley Keough, and Andrew Garfield. Van Patten was named one of Variety magazine's "10 Actors to Watch" in 2017. In the fall of 2018, she appeared as Joan of Arc opposite Glenn Close in The Public Theater's production of Mother of the Maid. She starred opposite Jovan Adepo in Kerem Sanga's drama The Violent Heart. In April 2026, she was reported by The Hollywood Reporter to be among several actresses who tested for a role in Man of Tomorrow.

She appeared in The Twisted Tale of Amanda Knox in 2025 as Amanda Knox. Her real-life younger sister Anna Van Patten also played Knox's younger sister Deanna.

== Personal life ==
Since 2022, Van Patten has been in a relationship with actor and Tell Me Lies co-star Jackson White.

== Acting credits ==
=== Film ===
Year	Title	Role	Director(s)	Notes	Ref.
2015	Stealing Cars	Maggie Wyatt	Bradley Kaplan		
2016	Tramps	Ellie	Adam Leon		
2017	Central Park	Leyla	Justin Reinsilber		
2017	The Meyerowitz Stories (New and Selected)	Eliza Meyerowitz	Noah Baumbach	Boston Society of Film Critics Award for Best Ensemble	
2017	The Wilde Wedding	Mackenzie Darling	Damian Harris		
2018	Under the Silver Lake	Balloon girl	David Robert Mitchell		
2019	Good Posture	Lilian	Dolly Wells		
2020	The Violent Heart	Cassie	Kerem Sanga		
2021	Mayday	Ana	Karen Cinorre		
TBA	Rubber Hut	Emanuella	Hanna Gray Organschi	Filming	

=== Television ===
Year	Title	Role	Notes	Ref.
2006	The Sopranos	Ally Pontecorvo	2 episodes: "Members Only" and "Join the Club"	
2013	Law & Order: Special Victims Unit	Jodie Lanier	Episode: "October Surprise"	
2014	Boardwalk Empire	Ruth Lindsay	Episode: "Cuanto"	
2018	Maniac	Olivia Meadows	Miniseries	
2021	Nine Perfect Strangers	Zoe	Main role	
2022–2026	Tell Me Lies	Lucy Albright	Main role	
2025	The Twisted Tale of Amanda Knox	Amanda Knox	Miniseries	

=== Stage ===
Year	Production	Theater	Role	Notes	Ref.
2017	The Whirligig	Pershing Square Signature Center	Julie	May 21 – June 18	
2018	Mother of the Maid	The Public Theater	Joan of Arc	September 25 – December 23	
