= Samuel Mancini =

American actor and musician

Background information
- Born: February 28, 1994 (age 32)
- Occupations: Singer-songwriter, actor, model
- Website: https://hoo.be/samuelmancini

Samuel Mancini is an American actor, model and singer-songwriter from Beaver Falls, Pennsylvania. Mancini made his acting debut alongside Olivia Wilde and Diane Keaton in the film Love the Coopers in 2015.

In 2017 Mancini released his debut EP titled ‘’Attention’’.

In 2021 Samuel released his first mixtape, Feed the Fire, which became a Billboard hit in March 2021. It also reached the top-twenty of the iTunes sales chart.

== Discography ==
- Attention – EP (2017)

=== Mixtapes ===
Title	Details	Peak chart positions		Certifications
Title	Details	Top Current Album Sales	Heatseekers Albums	Certifications
Feed the Fire	Released: February 26, 2021; Label: Eric West Management Group, Format: Digital download, CD, Vinyl	36	21	—

=== Charted songs ===
Year	Title	Chart Positions		Album
Year	Title	US	UK	Album
2023	"Soak" featuring Tashi	-	32	Non-album single

== Filmography ==
- Love the Coopers (2015)
