= The Violent Heart =

2020 American drama film

- Official poster
- Directed by: Kerem Sanga
- Written by: Kerem Sanga
- Produced by: Shawn Levy; Dan Cohen; Edward L. McDonnell; Tobey Maguire; Matthew Plouffe; P. Jennifer Dana; Mark Roberts
- Starring: Jovan Adepo; Grace Van Patten; Lukas Haas; Kimberly Williams-Paisley; Cress Williams; Jahi Di'Allo Winston; Mary J. Blige
- Cinematography: Ricardo Diaz
- Edited by: Joshua Raymond Lee
- Music by: John Swihart
- Production companies: 21 Laps Entertainment; Material Pictures; 3311 Productions; Endeavor Content
- Distributed by: Gravitas Ventures
- Release dates: September 9, 2020 (Deauville); February 19, 2021 (United States)
- Running time: 102 minutes
- Country: United States
- Language: English
- Box office: $23,614

The Violent Heart is a 2020 American drama film written and directed by Kerem Sanga. It stars Jovan Adepo, Grace Van Patten, Lukas Haas, Kimberly Williams-Paisley, Cress Williams, Jahi Di'Allo Winston, and Mary J. Blige. The film premiered at the Deauville Film Festival on September 9, 2020, and was released on February 19, 2021 by Gravitas Ventures.

== Plot ==
Fifteen years after the mysterious murder of his older sister Wendy, Daniel is striving to become a mechanical engineer for the Marines. He witnessed the murder of his sister, and so struggles to live a normal life with the memories he has. Daniel meets Cassie, a witty and loquacious young girl, who attends a local high school, when she has to stop by the auto shop for an oil change at her dad's request. Leaving the car behind, she asks Daniel to take her to the high school that his brother attends. Cassie tells Daniel about her father and speaks highly of him, but she discovers that her father is having an affair with a teacher at the school. Because of this, Cassie becomes estranged from her family and spends more time with Daniel, and the two begin to realise they have connections from the past.

== Cast ==
- Jovan Adepo as Daniel
- Grace Van Patten as Cassie
- Lukas Haas as Joseph
- Mary J. Blige as Nina
- Kimberly Williams-Paisley as Helen
- Jahi Di'Allo Winston as Aaron
- Cress Williams as Lee
- Rayven Symone Ferrell as Wendy

In addition, Jordan Preston Carter briefly appears as a young Daniel witnessing his sister's murder.

== Production ==
Kerem Sanga directed the film based on a screenplay he wrote, and brought on Shawn Levy, Dan Cohen, Ed McDonnell and Tobey Maguire to serve as producers under their 21 Laps Entertainment, 3311 Productions and Material Pictures banners, respectively.

In December 2017, Grace Van Patten and Jovan Adepo were cast, and Mary J. Blige, Lukas Haas, Jahi Di'Allo Winston and Kimberly Williams-Paisley joined the cast in January 2019. In February 2019, Cress Williams also joined the cast.

=== Filming ===
Principal photography began in February 2019 in Nashville.

== Release ==
The Violent Heart had its world premiere at the Deauville Film Festival on September 9, 2020. It was originally set to have its world premiere at the Tribeca Film Festival in April 2020, however, the festival was cancelled due to the COVID-19 pandemic. In December 2020, Gravitas Ventures acquired distribution rights to the film, and set it for a February 19, 2021 release.

== Reception ==
The Violent Heart holds a 56% approval rating on review aggregator website Rotten Tomatoes, based on 18 reviews, with an average of 5.6/10. On Metacritic, the film holds a rating of 49 out of 100 based on 9 critics, indicating "mixed or average reviews".
