= Josephine Pitz Egan =

American pilot (1913–2006)

- Born: March 30, 1913; Manitowoc, Wisconsin, U.S.
- Died: April 13, 2006 (aged 93); Denver, Colorado, U.S.
- Burial place: Arlington National Cemetery
- Alma mater: University of Wisconsin
- Spouse: John C. Egan (m. 1946–1961)
- Children: 2
- Military career
- Allegiance: United States
- Branch: United States Army Air Forces
- Service years: 1943–1944
- Rank: Lieutenant
- Nickname: Dodi
- Unit: Women Airforce Service Pilots

Josephine (Dodi) Pitz Egan (March 30, 1913 – April 13, 2006) was an American pilot who was a member of the Women Air Service Pilots (WASP) during World War II, having completed her training for the group on September 11, 1943, and was a member of class 43-W-5. The WASPs were a pioneering group of female pilots who flew non-combat missions to free up male pilots for combat roles. Her husband was Col. John Egan.

== Early life ==
Pitz was born in Manitowoc, Wisconsin, in 1913. She flew her first solo flight in September 1929 at the age of 16 and earned her pilot's license in August 1930, making her Manitowoc's first woman to do so. She graduated from the University of Wisconsin in 1935 with a degree in Chemistry.

Pitz was trained at Avenger Field in Sweetwater, Texas, where she learned to fly many aircraft. For her training, Pitz learned to fly the PT-19A, the BT-15, the AT-6, and the AT-17 Bobcat.

After her training, Pitz was stationed at several Army Air Force Bases during WWII. First, Pitz was stationed at New Castle Army-Air Force Base, where she flew and ferried the PT-19A, PT-26, L-4H, L-2M, UC-78, the Douglas A24, the P-47D, the P-51D, and the P-63.

Later, Pitz moved to Rosecrans Field in St. Joseph, Missouri, where she flew the C-49G, C-49E, C-47A, and the C-49H.

Lastly, at Brownsville, Texas AAB, she flew the P-47D, P-40N, P-51A, P-51C, P-39Q, and the P-37D. In June of 1944, she soloed all single-engine pursuit planes. She retired as a 1st Lieutenant.

== Post-WWII ==
Pitz married Col. John C. Egan, a member of the 100th Bomb Group, in 1945. After the war, she lived in Japan and Hawaii with John Egan until he died in 1961. She had two daughters: Katy Park and Annie Egan.

In 1977, Congress passed a bill recognizing the Women Airforce Service Pilots (WASP) as veterans. After the Air Force certified the WASP as military personnel, the bill was approved and signed into law by President Carter on November 23, 1977. Pitz worked with the WASP headquarters in Washington, D.C, to push for this bill.

== Death ==
Pitz died on April 13, 2006, at the age of 93. She is buried at Arlington National Cemetery alongside her husband.

== Popular culture ==
Pitz is mentioned as John Egan's spouse and acknowledged for her career as a WASP at the end of the Apple TV's miniseries "Masters of the Air" (2024).
