= Mobile Homes (film) =

2017 film

- Film poster
- Directed by: Vladimir de Fontenay
- Written by: Vladimir de Fontenay
- Starring: Imogen Poots; Callum Turner
- Release date: 21 May 2017 (Cannes)
- Country: Canada
- Language: English

Mobile Homes is a 2017 Canadian drama film directed by Vladimir de Fontenay. It was screened in the Directors' Fortnight section at the 2017 Cannes Film Festival.

== Cast ==
- Imogen Poots as Ali
- Callum Turner as Evan
- Callum Keith Rennie as Robert
- Frank Oulton as Bone

== Production ==
Filming took place in southern Ontario near the Canada–United States border.

== Reception ==
On review aggregator website Rotten Tomatoes, the film holds an approval rating of 58% based on 19 reviews, and an average rating of 6.05/10.
