= Master (2022 film) =

- Release poster
- Directed by: Mariama Diallo
- Written by: Mariama Diallo
- Produced by: Joshua Astrachan; Brad Becker-Parton; Andrea Roa
- Starring: Regina Hall; Zoe Renee; Amber Gray; Molly Bernard; Nike Kadri
- Cinematography: Charlotte Hornsby
- Edited by: Jennifer Lee; Maya Maffioli
- Music by: Robert Aiki Aubrey Lowe
- Production companies: Animal Kingdom; Big Indie Pictures
- Distributed by: Amazon Studios
- Release dates: January 21, 2022 (Sundance); March 18, 2022 (United States)
- Running time: 99 minutes
- Country: United States
- Language: English

Master is a 2022 American psychological black horror thriller film written and directed by Mariama Diallo in her directorial debut. The film stars Regina Hall, Zoe Renee, and Amber Gray.

Master had its world premiere at the Sundance Film Festival on January 21, 2022, and was released in the United States via Prime Video on March 18, 2022.

== Plot ==
Gail Bishop becomes the newly appointed and first Black master of Ancaster, an elite university in New England. The school is rumored to be cursed by the ghost of Margaret Millett, who was accused of witchcraft and hanged nearby. African American student Jasmine Moore moves in as a freshman and is assigned to room 302 along with her white roommate, Amelia. Their room was once occupied in 1965 by Louisa Weeks, Ancaster's first Black undergraduate, who committed suicide by hanging in her dorm.

Jasmine initially makes friends with Amelia's clique of wealthy, white students, although they ask her to clean up spilled drinks and don't pay her back for a pizza she orders. She also experiences various microagressions from staff and students. At a party, Amelia's crush kisses Jasmine and Amelia sees them. Amelia whispers to Jasmine that she hates her despite the roommates telling Gail everything is fine between them. Gail's new residence develops a maggot infestation.

Jasmine starts having nightmares in which she is attacked by a presence and believes that her English professor, Liv Beckman, is purposely giving her bad grades. She files a dispute, which impacts Liv's application for tenure. Jasmine receives racist threats by an unknown person, including a noose being placed on her door and a cross burning on campus. Her nightmares intensify, and she begins researching Louisa Weeks and discovers that she, too, was being tormented by a presence prior to her suicide.

One night, Gail discovers Amelia crying outside after two unseen guys run off abruptly. Amelia suggests she may have been sexually assaulted by a student but refuses to go to a hospital or speak out. She also becomes increasingly disturbed by Jasmine's nightmares, as well as the ominous atmosphere at school, and eventually drops outs.

Jasmine is chased by a figure in a black cloak, causing her to fall out of a window and be hospitalized. She tells Gail about the presence and expresses her desire to leave Ancaster; however, Gail rejects the notion of a supernatural presence and believes she is being harassed by a racist student. Jasmine returns to school and is found a few days later dead in her room, hanged.

Gail is contacted by Liv's mother, Esther Bickert, an Amish woman, who informs her that Liv was actually born white and named Elizabeth. But Liv left the community, changed her name, and began to present herself as Black. Esther implies it must have been a possession by the devil to make her do this. When confronted at a faculty party, Liv denies these claims and tells Gail that she was actually the daughter of a Black man, leaving it to the audience to decide what is the truth. Liv eventually leaves, putting on a black cloak that resembles the figure that was terrorizing Jasmine.

Gail criticizes the all-white faculty for enabling the covertly racist culture at Ancaster and realizes that she was not truly the school's master, but rather the "maid" who was meant to clean up the school's diversity problems. Gail notices that history has repeated itself, with no changes to Ancaster's diversity, and she resigns from her position.

== Cast ==
- Regina Hall as Gail Bishop
- Zoe Renee as Jasmine Moore
- Amber Gray as Liv Beckman
- Talia Ryder as Amelia
- Talia Balsam as Diandra
- Ella Hunt as Cressida
- Noa Fisher as Katie
- Kara Young as Sascha
- Bruce Altman as Brian
- Jennifer Dundas as Julianne
- Joel de la Fuente as Lam

== Production ==
In November 2019, it was announced Regina Hall had joined the cast of the film with Mariama Diallo directing from a screenplay she wrote, with Amazon Studios distributing. In March 2020, Zoe Renee, Amber Gray, Molly Bernard and Nike Kadri joined the cast.

Principal photography began in March 2020. Production on the film was shut down that same month due to the COVID-19 pandemic. It resumed filming in January 2021 in Poughkeepsie, New York, where Vassar College stood in for the fictional Ancaster College.

== Release ==
The film had its world premiere at the 2022 Sundance Film Festival on January 21, 2022. It also screened at South by Southwest on March 14, 2022. It was released on March 18, 2022.

== Reception ==
On the review aggregator website Rotten Tomatoes, 74% of 155 critics' reviews are positive, with an average rating of 6.5/10. The website's consensus reads: "It can be didactic rather than truly suspenseful, but Master is an impressively well-crafted horror outing with a lot on its mind." Metacritic, which uses a weighted average, assigned the film a score of 66 out of 100, based on 33 critics, indicating "generally favorable" reviews.

Richard Brody of The New Yorker wrote that the film was "a passionate and melancholy fantasy that employs supernatural elements for a bracingly realistic view of college life and American institutions." Alissa Wilkinson of Vox wrote: "The movie is so full of ideas that it can be hard to chase down the threads. But Diallo crafts a compelling and smart tale nonetheless, and an engrossing one at that." Ben Travis of Empire magazine gave the film 4/5 stars, writing: "Well-performed, especially by Regina Hall, and directed with real flair and intention by Mariama Diallo, Master transcends its two-dimensional opening to become a complex, character-driven horror with much on its mind." Peter Bradshaw of The Guardian gave the film 3/5 stars, describing it as "a pointed and intensely pessimistic horror-satire on racism and identity politics on the American campus", and added: "It could be that its material isn't fully absorbed into the screenplay, but there is real claustrophobia and unease in each insidious microaggression." Writing for Prime Movies, Albert Nowicki praised the film for being "nihilistic but real" and added: "Its message makes sense, the conclusions are accurate, its horror will turn out to be very personal and comprehensible for many."

Kevin Maher of The Times gave the film 2/5 stars. He noted some similarities to Get Out in Gail's storyline, but wrote: "Gail's story flops about aimlessly while idealistic new student Jasmine... is hounded by genre clichés... and a hooded figure striding spookily across the campus." Ann Hornaday of The Washington Post gave the film 2/4 stars, writing: "Although Diallo makes some trenchant observations about diversity-equity-inclusion initiatives and cultural appropriation, she jams too many plot beats, characters and polemical points into the narrative for all of them to pay off satisfactorily."
