= Feed the Fire (Samuel Mancini album) =

2021 mixtape by Samuel Mancini

Mixtape by Samuel Mancini
- Released: February 26, 2021
- Recorded: 2016–2020
- Genre: Pop
- Length: 44:44
- Label: Eric West Management Group
- Producers: Al Torrence; Samuel Mancini; ALVY; Kerim Wilhelm; Eric West

Samuel Mancini chronology
Attention (2016)	Feed the Fire (2021)

Feed the Fire is the debut mixtape by American singer and actor Samuel Mancini. It was released on February 26, 2021, by Eric West Management Group.

== Commercial performance ==
Feed the Fire debuted at number 58 on the Billboard Top Current Album Sales chart in the week ending March 13, 2021. Following the reissue of the Deluxe Red Edition of Feed the Fire released on October 22, 2021, the mixtape debuted at number 21 on the Billboard Top Heatseekers chart, number 54 on the Top Album Sales and re-entered the Billboard Top Current Album Sales at number 36 in the week ending November 6, 2021.

== Track listing ==
Feed the Fire
No.	Title	Writer(s)	Producer(s)	Length
1.	"Feed the Fire"	Samuel Mancini; Al Torrence	Torrence; Mancini	1:39
2.	"Undone"	Mancini; Torrence; Eric Rosa	Torrence; Mancini	2:56
3.	"Midnight" (featuring Freelance)	Lance James; Tysheeb Hickson-Baker; Mancini; Rosa; Abby Jury; Torrence	Torrence; Mancini; Freelance; Eric West	2:37
4.	"Second Heartbeat (Movin' On)"	Daniel Vidmar	Torrence	2:39
5.	"...Tell Me"	Daniel Fusco; Mancini	Fusco	0:48
6.	"Higher"	Mancini; Fusco	Fusco	2:53
7.	"The Lion"	Mancini; Rosa; Torrence	Torrence; Mancini	3:31
8.	"Who's Gonna Be There (Tell Me)" (featuring ALVY)	Mancini; William Caussignac; Fusco	ALVY	3:05
9.	"Reckless"	Janice Robinson; Rosa; Mancini	Torrence; Mancini; West	4:15
10.	"Phone Call"	Rosa; Mancini; Tressmon Scott; Torrence	West; Mancini; Scott; Torrence	0:30
11.	"Love... Thy Will Be Done"	Prince; Martika	Torrence; West; Mancini	4:10
12.	"Part of Me"	Mancini; Fusco	Fusco; Mancin; Kerim Wilhelm	3:37
Total length:				32:43

Feed the Fire Deluxe Red Edition
No.	Title	Writer(s)	Producer(s)	Length
1.	"Feed the Fire"	Samuel Mancini; Al Torrence	Torrence; Mancini	1:39
2.	"Undone"	Mancini; Torrence; Eric Rosa	Torrence; Mancini	2:56
3.	"Infatuation"	Mancini; Torrence	Torrence; Mancini	3:32
4.	"Midnight" (featuring Freelance)	Lance James; Tysheeb Hickson-Baker; Mancini; Rosa; Abby Jury; Torrence	Torrence; Mancini; Freelance; Eric West	2:37
5.	"Second Heartbeat (Movin' On)"	Daniel Vidmar	Torrence	2:39
6.	"...Tell Me"	Daniel Fusco; Mancini	Fusco	0:48
7.	"Higher"	Mancini; Fusco	Fusco	2:53
8.	"The Lion"	Mancini; Rosa; Torrence	Torrence; Mancini	3:31
9.	"Who's Gonna Be There (Tell Me)" (featuring ALVY)	Mancini; William Caussignac; Fusco	ALVY	3:05
10.	"Reckless"	Janice Robinson; Rosa; Mancini	Torrence; Mancini; West	4:15
11.	"Phone Call"	Rosa; Mancini; Tressmon Scott; Torrence	West; Mancini; Scott; Torrence	0:30
12.	"Love... Thy Will Be Done"	Prince; Martika	Torrence; West; Mancini	4:10
13.	"Part of Me"	Mancini; Fusco	Fusco; Mancin; Kerim Wilhelm	3:37
14.	"Don't Wanna Feel a Thing" (with ALVY)	Mancini; Caussignac; Fusco; Rosa	ALVY	2:41
15.	"Undone (Summer of '87)"	Torrence; Rosa; Mancini	Torrence; Mancini	2:27
16.	"Undone (Freestyle)"	Torrence; Rosa; Mancini	Torrence; Mancini	3:18
Total length:				44:44

== Personnel ==
Credits adapted from AllMusic.

Musicians

- Samuel Mancini – vocals
- Abby Jury – backing vocals
- Peter Leonardo – drums
- Al Torrence – backing vocals

Production

- Cody Alushin – design
- Alvy – production, mixing
- Dakora Calvett – photography
- Freelance – producer
- Daniel Fusco – production, mixing
- Chris Gehringer – mastering
- Timothy Mancini – photography
- Tressmon Scott – production, photography
- Al Torrence – production, mixing
- Eric West – producer, executive producer
- Kerim Wilhelm – production, mixing

== Charts ==
Chart (2021)	Peak position
US Top Album Sales (Billboard)	54
US Top Heatseekers (Billboard)	21
US Top Emerging Artists (Billboard)	24
