= Joe Rantz =

American rower (1914–2007)

- Rantz in 1936

Personal information
- Born: March 31, 1914 Spokane, Washington, U.S.
- Died: September 10, 2007 (aged 93) Redmond, Washington, U.S.
Medal record
Men's rowing
Representing the United States
Gold medal – first place	1936 Berlin	Men's eight

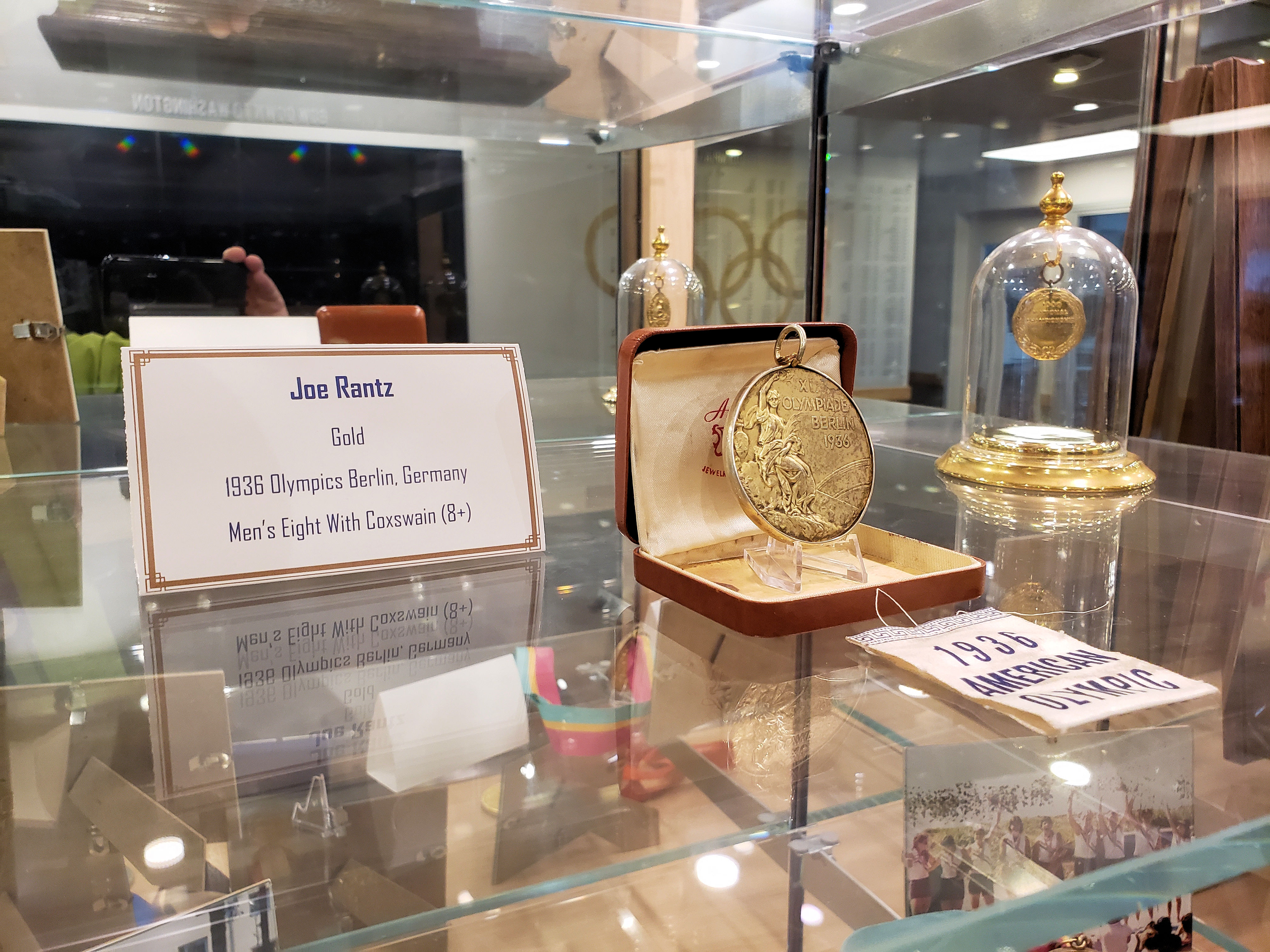
Joe Rantz's gold medal from the 1936 Berlin Summer Olympics, currently on display at the Conibear Shellhouse, University of Washington campus courtesy of the Rantz family

Joseph Harry Rantz (March 31, 1914 – September 10, 2007) was an American rower and chemical engineer. He won the Olympic gold in the men's eight at the 1936 Summer Olympics. Rantz worked as a chemical engineer for the Boeing aviation company for 35 years. He pioneered a dust-free particle workspace concept known as "safe room" that had wide impact on improving work environments in both aerospace and medical facilities. It was a precursor to the cleanroom.

== Early life ==
Born in Spokane, Washington, Joe Rantz had a harsh childhood in Boulder City, Idaho and, later, Sequim, Washington. His mother, Nellie Maxwell (1881–1918), died from throat cancer when Rantz was four. His father, Harry Rantz (1880–1966), remarried in 1921, but Rantz did not connect well with his stepmother, Thula LaFollete (1897–1935), who struggled to raise Rantz and her four younger biological children.

Rantz was abandoned by his family at the age of 15, and had to fend for himself from that point on. He supported himself working in hay fields and by chopping down trees along the Dungeness River and selling the wood to a pulp mill in Port Angeles. He reared himself in an unfinished house abandoned by his father and stepmother and put himself through high school. He attended Seattle's Roosevelt High School his senior year. He gained admission to the University of Washington.

== Rowing and later career ==
Rantz rowed in the University of Washington senior varsity eights which won US national Intercollegiate Rowing Association titles in 1936 and 1937 as well as the victorious sophomore eight of 1935 and freshman eight of 1934. Rantz is the central character in the non-fiction book The Boys in the Boat, which chronicles his struggles through life in his early years, culminating with his Olympic gold medal win from the seven seat of the US men's eight at Berlin in 1936. The book inspired the PBS documentary American Experience: The Boys of '36 and a 2023 feature film directed by George Clooney, where Rantz was portrayed by Callum Turner.

Rantz earned a chemical engineering degree from the university and worked for Boeing for 35 years following his retirement from rowing, inventing a precursor of the cleanroom known as "safe room".

== Personal life ==
In 1939 Rantz married his college sweetheart, Joyce Simdars. They were married for 63 years until Joyce's death in 2002. They had five children.

Rantz died of congestive heart failure at the home of his daughter in Redmond, Washington, at age 93.
