= Gimme the Loot (film) =

2012 film

- Theatrical release poster
- Directed by: Adam Leon
- Written by: Adam Leon
- Produced by: Natalie Difford; Dominic Buchanan; Jamund Washington
- Starring: Ty Hickson; Tashiana Washington
- Cinematography: Jonathan Miller
- Edited by: Morgan Faust
- Music by: Nicholas Britell
- Distributed by: IFC Films
- Release date: March 10, 2012 (SXSW)
- Running time: 79 minutes
- Country: United States
- Language: English
- Box office: $104,235

Gimme the Loot is a 2012 American comedy film written and directed by Adam Leon. The film competed in the Un Certain Regard section at the 2012 Cannes Film Festival. It won the Grand Jury Prize at the SXSW Film Festival in 2012. It was released on March 22, 2013, in the U.S.

== Cast ==
- Ty Hickson as Malcolm
- Tashiana Washington as Sophia
- Zoë Lescaze as Ginnie
- Meeko as Champion
- Sam Soghor as Lenny
- Joshua Rivera as Rico

== Release ==
After premiering at SXSW, Gimme the Loot was picked up for distribution by IFC Films/Sundance Selects in North and Latin America. It was officially “presented” in its release by Oscar-winning filmmaker Jonathan Demme.

The movie made its international premiere at the Cannes Film Festival and went on to play at numerous festivals around the world, including the London Film Festival, Deauville American Film Festival, and the Los Angeles Film Festival. It was released theatrically in France by Diaphana in January 2013, IFC Films/Sundance Selects in the U.S. on March 22, 2013, and by Soda Pictures in the U.K. in May 2013.

== Reception ==
=== Critical response ===
On the review aggregator website Rotten Tomatoes, 91% of 69 critics' reviews are positive, with an average rating of 7.4/10. The website's consensus reads: "Thanks to energetic performances from its young leads, Gimme The Loot captures a slice of city life with warmth and exuberance." Metacritic, another review aggregation website, assigned the film a score of 81 out of 100, based on 27 reviews from mainstream critics.

Roger Ebert called it, “A remarkably natural and unaffected film about friendship between two high-spirited graffiti artists” and Peter Travers of Rolling Stone in his 3.5 star review said the movie is, “A fresh, funky jolt of filmmaking joy.”

A.O. Scott of The New York Times wrote that, “Adam Leon’s loose and rambunctious debut… has a lot to say about the contradictions of a place that is defined by both abundant opportunity and ferocious inequality. But the film makes its points in a lighthearted, street-smart vernacular, treating its protagonists not as embodiments of a social condition but rather as self-aware individuals who are, like teenagers everywhere, both smart and dumb. Their friendship — which is based above all on shared artistic ambitions — is a perfect comic pairing.”

Other notable positive reviews included the Los Angeles Times, Christian Science Monitor, NPR, Entertainment Weekly, Chicago Tribune, The Wall Street Journal, and Chicago Sun-Times, whose Sheila O'Malley wrote, “Adam Leon has created something unique and current, with affectionate nods to New York films of the past.”

=== Box office ===
Released on March 22, 2013, in the United States, Gimme the Loot opened to the highest per screen average in the country.

=== Accolades ===
Along with the winning the Grand Jury Prize at the 2012 SXSW Film Festival, Gimme the Loot was nominated for Best First Feature and won the Someone to Watch Award for director Adam Leon at the 2013 Independent Spirit Awards.

Adam Leon received a Gotham Award nomination for Bingham Ray Breakthrough Director in 2013.

The film also won Best Director at the Sofia Film Festival and Best Feature at the Molodist Film Festival, with lead actor Ty Hickson receiving a Special Jury Mention.
