= Callum Turner =

British actor (born 1990)

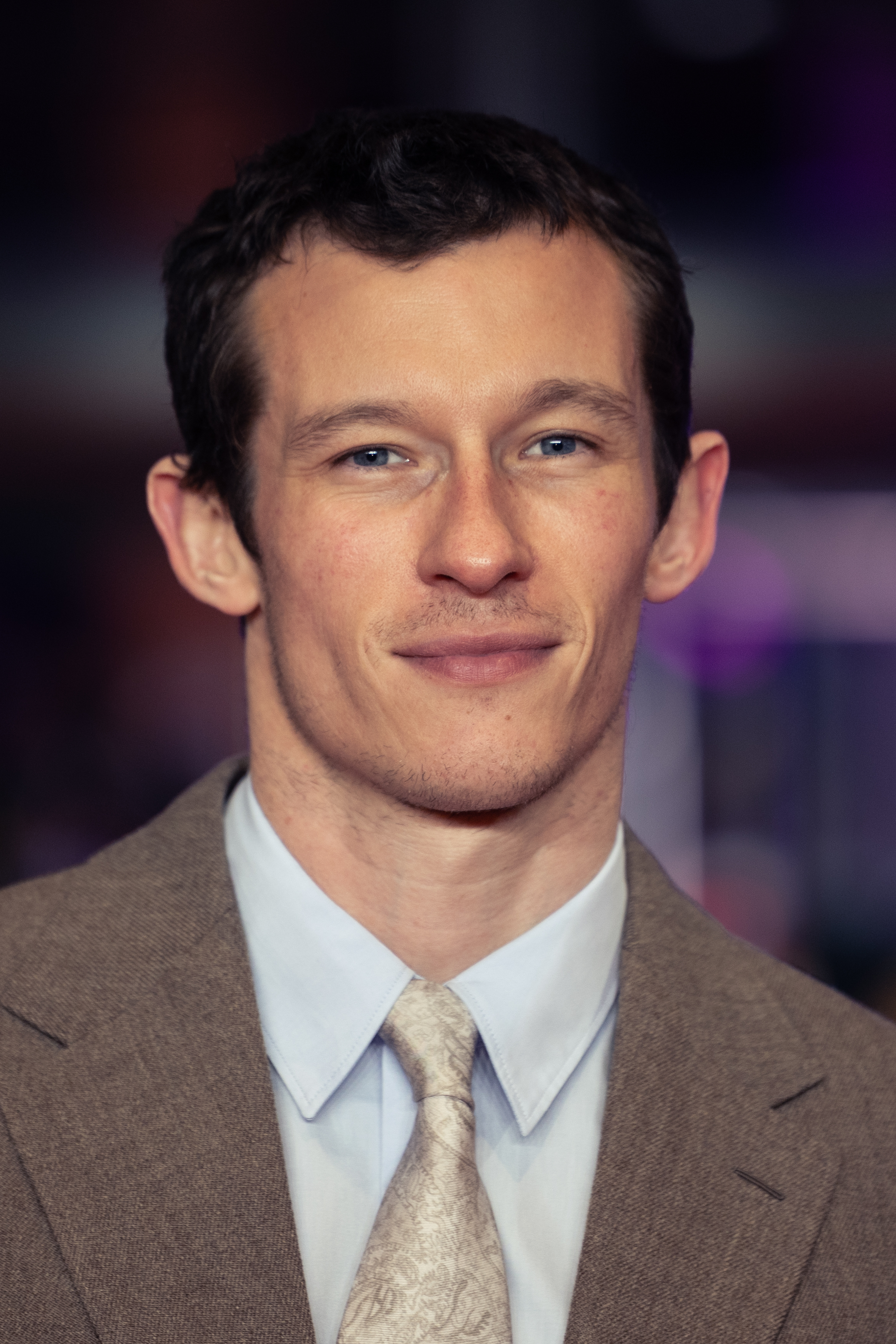
- Turner in 2026
- Born: Callum Robilliard Turner; 15 February 1990 (age 36); Hammersmith, London, England
- Occupation: Actor
- Years active: 2010–present
- Spouse: Dua Lipa (m. 2026)

Callum Robilliard Turner (born 15 February 1990) is a British actor. After working as a fashion model, he began working in film and television. He had lead roles in the drama film Queen and Country (2014) and mystery drama series Glue (2014) and played Theseus, the brother of Newt Scamander, in the fantasy films Fantastic Beasts: The Crimes of Grindelwald (2018) and Fantastic Beasts: The Secrets of Dumbledore (2022).

Turner's performance in the mystery series The Capture (2019) earned him a nomination for the British Academy Television Award for Best Actor. He has since starred as Joe Rantz in the biographical film The Boys in the Boat (2023), as John "Bucky" Egan in the miniseries Masters of the Air (2024), and alongside Miles Teller and Elizabeth Olsen in the fantasy romantic comedy Eternity (2025).

== Early life ==
Callum Robilliard Turner was born on 15 February 1990 in Hammersmith, London, England. He was raised on a council estate in Chelsea, London, by his mother who was a club promoter at the time. His middle name is after his mother's friend, poet David Robilliard, who died over a year before Turner was born.

On his upbringing, Turner said: "The thing I always find interesting in my childhood was, yeah, I was growing up on an estate, single mum, working-class, but then I also had all these colourful characters around. It wasn’t about navigating two worlds. There were three, four, five more." His mother instilled in him a love of film and inspired him to become an actor. After leaving school early to play football semi-professionally, he became a model and also worked at Dover Street Market before acting.

== Career ==
Turner started his career in 2010, modelling for companies such as Next and Reebok, and in his first acting role for the short student film Think of England for the University of Hertfordshire Film and Television programme.

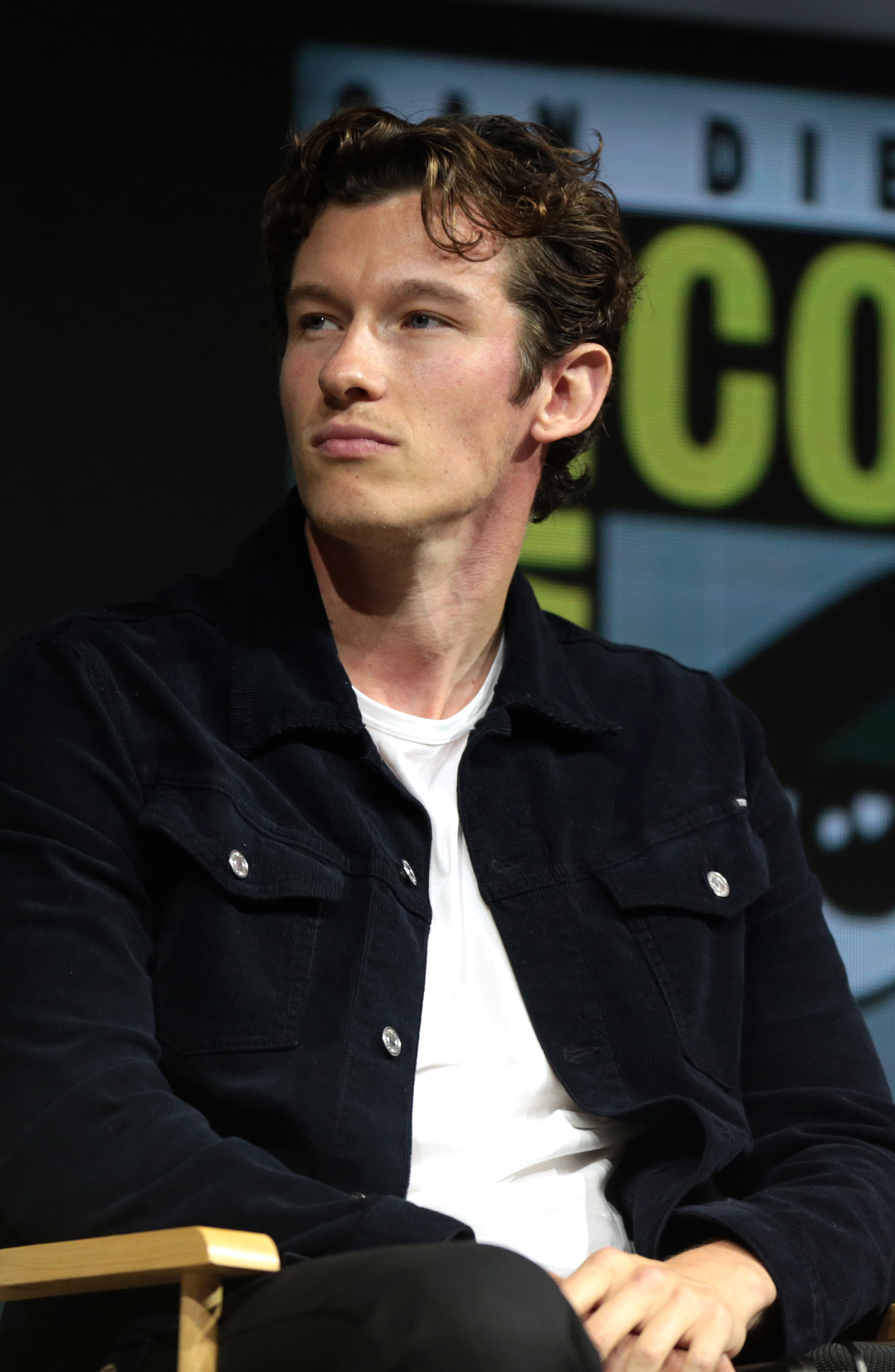
Turner in 2018

Turner starred as Tony in Zero, a 2011 film directed by David Barrouk and produced by Michael Riley. In 2012, he starred alongside Waterloo Road star Ben-Ryan Davies in the short film Human Beings, directed by Jonathan Entwistle. He appeared in the French group The Shoes' 2012 music video "Time to Dance" with Jake Gyllenhaal. In 2012, Turner was in the ITV series Leaving, alongside Helen McCrory. Turner's performance was met with mostly positive reviews. In December 2012, Turner starred with Andrew Scott and Martin Clunes in another ITV Drama, The Town, portraying Ashley, a troubled teen. In early 2013, Turner made a guest appearance in Showtime's historical-fiction drama television series, The Borgias as Calvino. He also starred in short film Alleycats as Eze, directed by Ian Bonhôte, and had a small role as Phillip in the second series of BBC One's Ripper Street.

In June 2012, Turner was cast in the lead role of John Boorman's film Queen and Country. Turner stated that Boorman revealed secret and personal events from his life, to help Turner to portray his character as best as he could. The film made its debut as part of the Directors' Fortnight section of the 2014 Cannes Film Festival. In E4's whodunit series Glue in 2014, Turner portrayed Eli, a traveller, whose brother is murdered. In 2014, he was among those named Breakthrough Brits by the British Academy of Film and Television Arts.

Turner portrayed Alistair in Paul McGuigan's 2015 horror film Victor Frankenstein. He starred as Danny in the 2016 film Tramps, which premiered at the 2016 Toronto International Film Festival. In 2017, he portrayed Evan in Mobile Homes. The film was screened in the Directors' Fortnight section at the 2017 Cannes Film Festival. He portrayed Theseus Scamander in Fantastic Beasts: The Crimes of Grindelwald in 2018 and in Fantastic Beasts: The Secrets of Dumbledore in 2022. In 2018, Turner also directed and co-wrote short film Shift the Plane with friend and co-writer Danny King. He had a lead role as Shaun Emery in the 2019 BBC One series The Capture and was nominated for the British Academy Television Award for Best Actor for his performance.

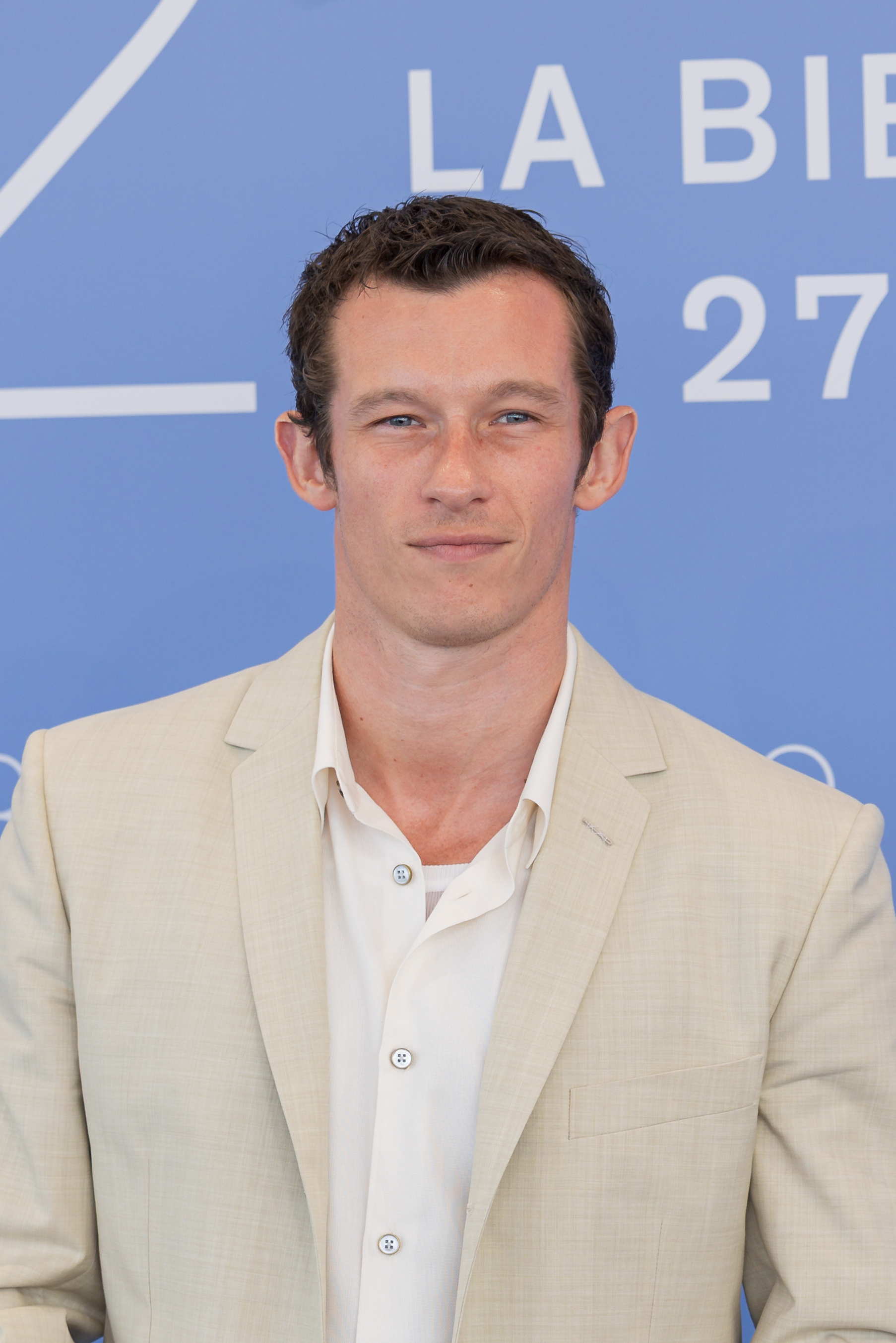
Turner at the 82nd Venice International Film Festival

In 2020, Turner portrayed Frank Churchill in the comedy-drama film Emma. In 2021, he portrayed Anthony O'Hare in the romantic drama The Last Letter from Your Lover, alongside Shailene Woodley and Felicity Jones. In 2023, Turner portrayed Joe Rantz in The Boys in the Boat, directed by George Clooney. In 2024, he portrayed John "Bucky" Egan in the miniseries Masters of the Air.

In April 2024, it was announced that Turner was cast as Case in the Apple TV+ series adaptation of William Gibson's seminal cyberpunk novel Neuromancer. He would next star in Will Gluck's One Night Only alongside Monica Barbaro and Maya Hawke, and Karim Aïnouz's satirical tragicomedy thriller Rosebush Pruning with Jamie Bell, Elle Fanning, and Pamela Anderson.

In October 2026, Turner did a screen test for the role of James Bond in London. The role ultimately went to Robert Pattinson.

== Personal life ==
Turner is a supporter of Chelsea F.C. He dated British actress Vanessa Kirby from 2015 to 2019.

Turner entered a relationship with British singer-songwriter Dua Lipa in January 2024. Their engagement was formally announced during Lipa's July 2025 cover story with British Vogue following a period of media rumours. The couple were married on 31 May 2026 in a civil ceremony at Marylebone Town Hall in London. A second wedding ceremony was held in the Sicilian comune of Bagheria on 6 June, which was the centrepiece of a three-day celebration in Palermo that reportedly cost £1.3 million. Residents were divided by the festivities; some were "proud" to host while others criticised its disruption to their daily lives.

== Filmography ==
=== Film ===
Key
†	Denotes productions that have not yet been released

Year	Title	Role	Notes
2014	Queen and Country	Bill Rohan	
2015	Green Room	Tiger	
2015	Victor Frankenstein	Alistair	
2016	Tramps	Danny	
2016	Assassin's Creed	Nathan	
2017	Mobile Homes	Evan	
2017	The Only Living Boy in New York	Thomas Webb	
2018	Fantastic Beasts: The Crimes of Grindelwald	Theseus Scamander	
2020	Emma	Frank Churchill	
2020	Divine	Gregory	
2021	The Last Letter from Your Lover	Anthony O'Hare	
2022	Fantastic Beasts: The Secrets of Dumbledore	Theseus Scamander	
2023	The Boys in the Boat	Joe Rantz	
2025	Atropia	Abu Dice	
2025	Rose of Nevada	Liam	
2025	Eternity	Luke	
2026	Rosebush Pruning	Ed	
2026	One Night Only	Owen	
2027	Possession †		Filming
2027	The Comebacker †		Filming

=== Television ===
Year	Title	Role	Notes	Ref.
2012	Leaving	Aaron	Miniseries, Main role, 3 episodes	
2012	The Town	Ashley	2 episodes	
2013	The Borgias	Calvino	1 episode	
2013	Ripper Street	Phillip	1 episode	
2014	Glue	Eli	Main role, 8 episodes	
2016	War & Peace	Prince Anatole Kuragin	Miniseries, 6 episodes	
2019	The Capture	Shaun Emery	Recurring role, 6 episodes	
2024	Masters of the Air	Major John Egan	Miniseries, 9 episodes	
2027	Neuromancer †	Henry Dorsett Case	Upcoming series	

=== Theatre ===
Year	Title	Role	Notes	Ref.
2011	The Colour of Home	Charlie	The Cockpit Theatre	
2013	Hard Feelings	Tone	Finborough Theatre	

=== Music videos ===
Year	Song	Artist(s)	Role	Ref.
2012	"Time to Dance"	The Shoes	Dancing Boy	

== Awards and nominations ==
Year	Association	Category	Work	Result	Ref.
2014	British Academy of Film and Television Arts	Breakthrough Brits	—N/a	Honored	
2020	British Academy Television Awards	Best Actor	The Capture	Nominated	
2024	Satellite Award	Best Actor – Miniseries or Television Film	Masters of the Air	Nominated	
