= 12 O'Clock Boys =

2013 documentary film directed by Lotfy Nathan

- Directed by: Lotfy Nathan
- Produced by: John Kassab; Eric Blair; Tom Colley
- Cinematography: Lotfy Nathan
- Edited by: Thomas Niles
- Music by: Joe Williams
- Distributed by: Oscilloscope Laboratories
- Release date: March 2013 (SXSW)
- Running time: 75 minutes
- Country: United States
- Language: English

12 O'Clock Boys is a 2013 American documentary film directed by Lotfy Nathan. The documentary focuses on urban dirt-bike riders in Baltimore, Maryland, and one boy's fascination with dirt bikes and desire to join the 12 O'Clock Boys group (named for doing a high angle wheelie that mimics a clock’s hands at 12 o'clock).

== Production ==
The group, known as the "12 O'Clock Boyz", emerged at illegal street rides by the start of the 21st century, and two members videotaped the stunts in 2001 and 2003. For the documentary the boy, Pug, was filmed over several years starting when he was 11, using a high-speed Phantom camera, whose footage was slowed, as well as a Canon 7G, with the crew strapped into the bed of a truck. Nathan, the director, was arrested once on suspicion of participation in the rides. The film also includes interviews with members of the group as well as Pug's mother, Coco, plus footage from a variety of local newscasts and clips from the 12 O'Clock Boyz videos.

== Release ==
The film was premiered at South by Southwest 2013, and had its Baltimore premiere at the Maryland Film Festival 2013. It was acquired for U.S. theatrical distribution by Oscilloscope Laboratories in 2013.
