= Carola von Braun =

German politician (1942–2026)

- Von Braun in 2022

Member of the Bundestag
- In office 4 November 1980 – 29 March 1983

Member of the Senate of West Berlin
- In office 1 October 1984 – 1990

Member of the Berlin House of Representatives
- In office 11 January 1991 – 17 February 1994

Personal details
- Born: 12 September 1942 Nakuru, Colony of Kenya
- Died: 7 August 2026 (aged 83) Germany
- Party: FDP
- Relations: Magnus von Braun (grandfather); Wernher von Braun (uncle); Magnus von Braun (uncle)
- Parent: Sigismund von Braun
- Education: University of Bonn

Carola Freifrau von Braun (12 September 1942 – 7 August 2026) was a German politician, especially active for women's rights. A member of the Free Democratic Party (FDP), she served in the Bundestag from 1980 to 1983 and in the Senate of West Berlin from 1984 to 1990, as its first Women's Representative (Frauenbeauftragte) responsible for women's rights. She led the Berlin FDP from 1990 to 1994, and was a member of the Berlin House of Representatives from 1991 to 1994, where she headed the FDP fraction. She founded an independent women's initiative in Berlin in 1982 and held positions in the Protestant Church of Germany and the Friedrich Naumann Foundation, among others.

== Life and career ==
=== Early life ===
Von Braun was born in Nakuru, Colony of Kenya (present-day Kenya), then a British colony, on 12 September 1942, into the von Braun noble family. She was the eldest of five children of Hildegard Beck-Margis (1915–2001) and the diplomat Sigismund von Braun. She was born during World War II, and her family lived in a Kenyan camp for an extended period. Her maternal grandmother, Hildegard Margis, died in the Barnimstraße women's prison, after she was accused of being in the resistance movement and being connected to a group that included Anton Saefkow and Franz Jacob. Her grandfather was a politician of the DNVP, Magnus von Braun, who served as minister in the Papen cabinet and the Schleicher cabinet during the last years of the Weimar Republic. Her uncle was the rocket engineer Wernher von Braun, and cultural scientist Christina von Braun was her sister.

As a child, Carola lived with her mother and her siblings in Vatican City between 1944 and 1949. Her father was a legation secretary (Legationssekretär) for Nazi Germany to the Vatican, and the family fled there when the Allies entered Rome.

Later, von Braun grew up in Bonn, where she completed the Abitur in 1961 at the Nicolaus-Cusanus-Gymnasium. She studied English and history, first at the University of Bonn, then in Berlin. She first worked as a journalist. From 1973 she worked in Bonn as an assistant to members of parliament including Dieter Lattmann (SPD), Helga Schuchardt (FDP) and Anke Martiny (SPD). In 1974 she joined the Free Democratic Party (FDP).

=== Political career ===
Von Braun was elected to the district council of the Rhein-Sieg-Kreis in 1975; from 1979 to 1981, she headed the FDP fraction there. She was elected to the Bundestag, the national parliament, in 1980 and remained until her term prematurely ended in 1983. She was active in education and cultural politics. Von Braun belonged to the left wing of her party and in 1982 opposed the termination of the coalition of the SPD and FDP in the third Helmut Schmidt cabinet.

She served in the Senate of West Berlin from 1984 to 1990 as its first Women's Representative (Frauenbeauftragte), with mayor Eberhard Diepgen. From 1985, this position was held by the senator for youth and families, Cornelia Schmalz-Jacobsen. Von Braun retained the position even in the red-green Momper Senate from 1989 onward.

In 1990, after German reunification, the FDP was the first party in Berlin to unite its groups from West and East, and she was elected party leader, although the majority of members came from the East. She was a member of the Berlin House of Representatives from 1991 to 1994, serving as leader of her party fraction. In 1994, she was exposed in the "Figaro Affair" of having paid travel and hairdresser expenses with party money, and resigned from her positions.

Von Braun was head of the referate for education in the senate until 2005.

=== Women's initiative ===
Von Braun began to focus on the interests of women in the 1980s, and she founded an initiative for women, the Überparteiliche Fraueninitiative, in the House of Representatives in Berlin in 1992, after German reunification. It united women working in parliament with others who were active on basic women's projects.

=== Other positions ===
Von Braun was active on the board of the Friedrich Naumann Foundation from 1982 to 1992. From the 1990s, von Braun was active in leadership positions for the German Evangelical Church Assembly and for the synod of the Evangelische Kirche in Deutschland (EKD). She also worked for the Berlin Protestant Church in a working group for economics and labor. From 2008 to 2018, she was vice-president of the Evangelische Akademie Berlin.

=== Personal life ===
Von Braun was married; the couple had two sons. Her second husband was the jurist Jürgen Colsman, who she was married to until his death in 2021. They lived in Prenzlauer Berg.

Von Braun died on 7 August 2026, at the age of 83.

== Awards ==
- 2010: Order of Merit of the Federal Republic of Germany
- 2015: Louise Schroeder Medal
- 2021: Stadtälteste von Berlin
- 2026: Award from the Überparteiliche Fraueninitiative
