= Sigismund von Braun =

German diplomat (1911–1998)

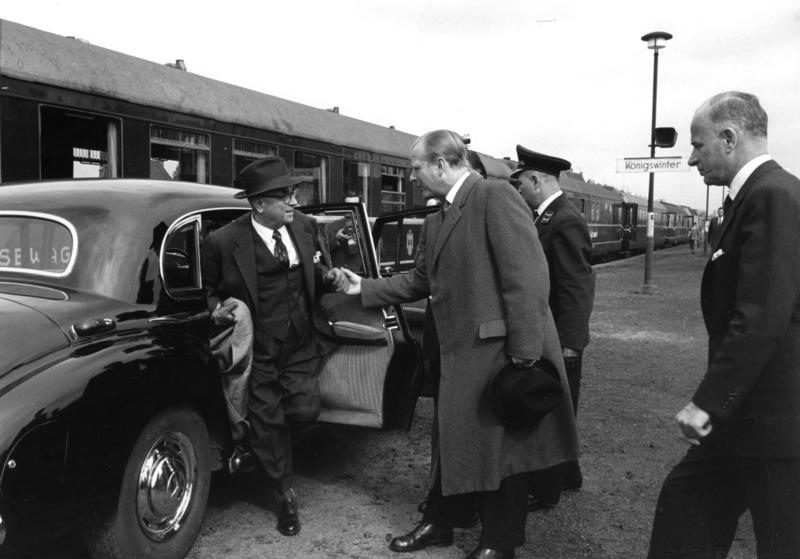
- Von Braun receives Turkish President Celâl Bayar in 1958 during a state visit.

Ambassador of West Germany to France
- In office 1972–1976
- Preceded by: Hans Hellmuth Ruete
- Succeeded by: Axel Herbst

Secretary of State of the Federal Foreign Office
- In office 1970–1972

Ambassador of West Germany to France
- In office 1968–1970
- Preceded by: Manfred Klaiber
- Succeeded by: Hans Hellmuth Ruete

Permanent Representative of West Germany to the United Nations
- In office 1962–1968
- Preceded by: Karl Heinrich Knappstein
- Succeeded by: Alexander Böker

Chief of Protocol at the Federal Foreign Office
- In office 1959–1962
- Succeeded by: Ehrenfried von Holleben

Personal details
- Born: 14 April 1911 Berlin, German Empire
- Died: 13 July 1998 (aged 87) Bonn, Germany
- Party: Free Democratic Party
- Relations: Wernher von Braun (brother); Magnus von Braun (brother)
- Children: Carola von Braun; Christina von Braun
- Parent: Magnus von Braun (father)
- Occupation: Diplomat

Sigismund Freiherr von Braun (14 April 1911 – 13 July 1998) was a German diplomat and Secretary of State in the Federal Foreign Office (1970–1972).

== Biography ==
Sigismund von Braun was born in Berlin-Zehlendorf in 1911, the eldest son of the East Prussian landowner and later Reich Food Minister Magnus von Braun Sr.. His brothers were rocket scientists Wernher von Braun and Magnus von Braun Jr., and he was the father of politician Carola von Braun and cultural theorist Christina von Braun.

After an apprenticeship in 1934, Braun spent a year at the University of Cincinnati in the United States, studying law on a scholarship from the German Academic Exchange Service. After this, he made a trip around the world, taking in Japan, China, Malaya, and India. In 1936, he became an attaché in the German Foreign Service. Until April 1937, he was the personal assistant of the German ambassador in Paris, but in September, due to a dispute with Baldur von Schirach he was reassigned to a new posting at Addis Ababa. On 1 October 1939, he joined the Nazi Party. In 1943 he became Legation Secretary of the Embassy to the Holy See in Rome, where he remained until 1946. During denazification, Braun was classified as "discharged", despite his party membership, as he had "supported clerical and other offices in hiding people persecuted for religious, political and racial reasons and to obviate their deportation, taking high personal risk." After internment in Germany, he occasionally worked in the private sector, first as an assistant at several Nuremberg trials, then on the Wilhelmstrasse trial of Ernst von Weizsäcker, and finally as an employee of the state of Rhineland-Palatinate.

In 1954, Braun entered the diplomatic service of the Federal Republic of Germany, and in 1956 joined the FDP. He was Chief of Protocol of the Foreign Office from 1962 to 1968, Permanent Representative at the United Nations in New York from 1968 to 1970, Secretary of State from 1970 to 1972, and then German Ambassador to France from 1972 to 1976. Braun died on 13 July 1998 at age 87.

== Awards ==
- 1962: Grand Gold Medal with Star for Services to the Republic of Austria

== Publications ==
- France and Germany, in view of the European elections, held lectures at the invitation of East Prussia sheet and the Heads of State and Political Economy Society e V. Hamburg on 16 May 1979 in Hamburg / Sigismund Freiherr von Braun. - Hamburg: State and Society Political Economy, 1979. - 16 pages - (Small swg-series, H 17)
- Sigismund von Braun: Volatile Guests. On World Tour 1933–1935. Herchen + Hague, Frankfurt am Main 1993, ISBN 978-3-89228-980-7

== Literature ==
- Christina von Braun: Stille Post. Eine andere Familiengeschichte. Propylaea-Verlag, Berlin 2007, ISBN 978-3-549-07314-8 (in German).
- Jobst Knigge: The Ambassador and the Pope. Weizsäcker and Pius XII. The German Embassy Vatican 1943–1945. Verlag Dr. Kovac, Hamburg 2008, ISBN 978-3-8300-3467-4 .
- Maria Keipert (ed.): Biographical Handbook of the German Foreign Service 1871–1945. Issued by the Foreign Office, Historical Service. Volume 1: John Hurter : A-F. Schöningh, Paderborn and others 2000, ISBN 3-506-71840-1 .

Diplomatic posts
Preceded by Karl Heinrich Knappstein	Permanent Representative of Germany to the United Nations; 1962–1968	Succeeded by Alexander Böker
Preceded by Günther Harkort	Secretary of State in the Foreign Office; 1970–1972	Succeeded by Paul Frank
Preceded by Manfred Klaiber	Ambassador of the Federal Republic of Germany to France; 1968–1970	Succeeded by Hans Hellmuth Ruete
Preceded by Hans Hellmuth Ruete	Ambassador of the Federal Republic of Germany to France; 1972–1976	Succeeded by Axel Herbst
