= Magnus von Braun =

German-American rocket scientist (1919–2003)

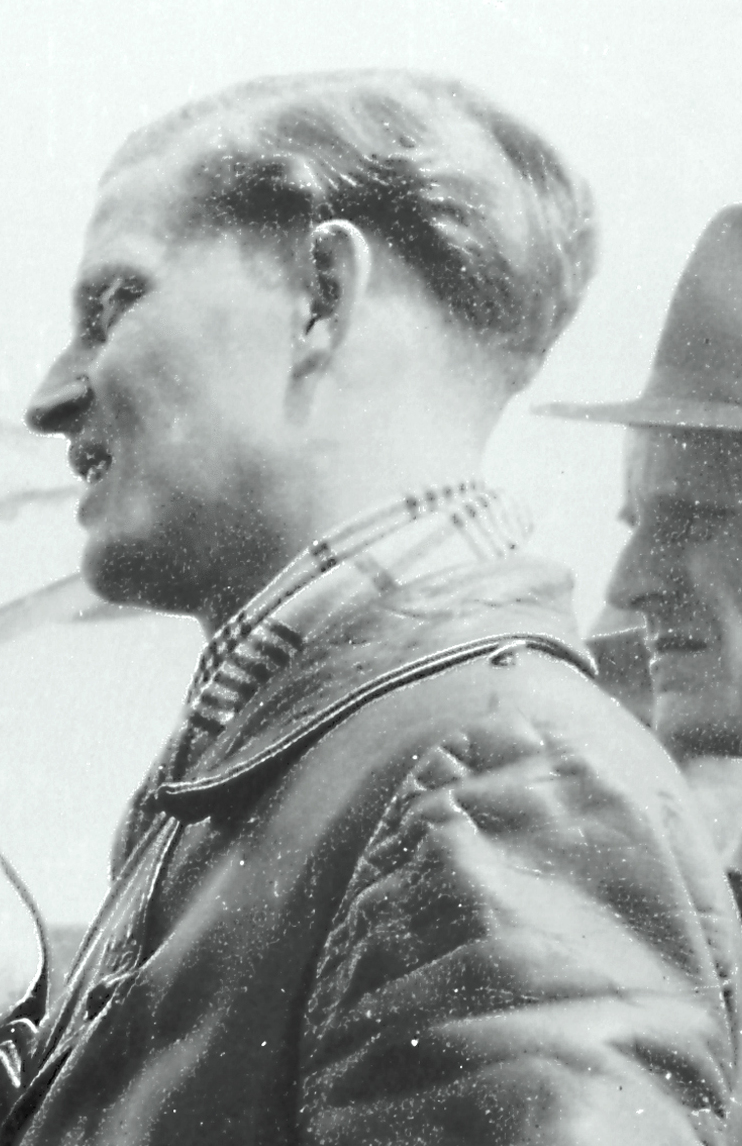
- Born: 10 May 1919; Greifswald, Germany
- Died: 21 June 2003 (aged 84); Phoenix, Arizona, U.S.
- Education: Technical University of Munich
- Spouses: Hildegard Buchhold (1950–1955); Nathalie "Nan" Heaton-Woodruff (1957–2003)
- Children: 3
- Father: Magnus von Braun
- Relatives: Sigismund von Braun (brother); Wernher von Braun (brother)
- Scientific career
- Fields: Aerospace engineering, chemistry
- Academic advisors: Hans Fischer

Notes
- Braun, Magnus Freiherr von (1965). Weg durch vier Zeitepochen (Way through four time periods) (in German). Starke: Limburg an der Lahn.

Magnus Freiherr von Braun (10 May 1919 – 21 June 2003) was a German-American chemical engineer, Luftwaffe aviator, rocket scientist and business executive. A highly-regarded member of the Nazi Party, in his 20s he worked on Germany's guided missile development and production at the Peenemünde Army Research Center and the Mittelwerk from 1943 to 1945.

At age 26, he emigrated to the United States via Operation Paperclip, where he worked for some years at Fort Bliss. In 1955 he began a new career as a senior executive with Chrysler's missile division, later moving to automotive products. He retired to Arizona in 1975, where he died in 2003. He was the younger brother of Sigismund and Wernher von Braun.

== Early life ==
von Braun was born in Greifswald, Pomerania, to Magnus Freiherr von Braun and Emmy von Quistorp. His politician father moved the family to Berlin in 1920, where the three boys "lived in a bubble of upper-class privilege, with a butler, servants, and a grand piano." Magnus attended primary school at Berlin's prestigious French Gymnasium prior to finishing his secondary education at the Hermann Lietz-Schule boarding school in Spiekeroog. He joined the Nazi party upon graduation and subsequently served as a Spiekeroog Hitler Youth leader. Magnus moved to Munich in 1937 to attend the Technical University of Munich. He studied chemistry and posted excellent grades, receiving his master's degree in 1940 in organic chemistry, and subsequently became an assistant to Nobel laureate Hans Fischer.

Unlike his older siblings, Magnus experienced a National Socialist adolescence. His brothers can be seen as having joined the Nazis for reasons of professional advancement; Magnus signed on for the ideology. His politicized early years naturally influenced his character. Even well after the war, Magnus stood apart from his friendly and gregarious brother Wernher by his displays of arrogance and aristocratic pretension. This was duly noted by Army officers who kept files on both von Brauns after their 1945 arrival in the United States. One Fort Bliss Counterintelligence Corps agent took such a dislike to Magnus that sometime in 1948 or 1949, he wrote in his file that the youngest von Braun was a "dangerous German Nazi", adding that "his type is a worse threat to security than a half a dozen discredited SS Generals."

The two younger von Braun brothers shared an enthusiasm for aviation, and like Wernher, Magnus also took up sailplane flying as a teenager. In October 1940, as the war entered its second year, the newly minted chemist and glider pilot was promptly drafted into the Luftwaffe. There he learned to fly multi-engine aircraft, and became proficient enough at instrument and night flying to be assigned as an instructor, temporarily avoiding frontline service. In mid-1943, as the Allied bombing campaign intensified and German aviator losses soared, Magnus received orders to train on fighter planes. At this point, Wernher stepped in and used his influence to get his younger sibling discharged from the air service and hired as a civilian chemical engineer at the Nazi rocket research center near Peenemünde. This move likely spared the younger von Braun's life, as German fighter pilots suffered staggering losses during the last two years of the war.

== Peenemünde Army Research Center ==
Once he checked in at the secret base on the Baltic, Magnus was initially assigned to the propellant development section of the Wasserfall antiaircraft missile, due to his chemical expertise. His brother Wernher was then the wunderkind 31 year-old technical director of the entire facility, orchestrating hundreds of engineers and thousands of workers to produce the world's first liquid-fueled rocket able to reach outer space. Magnus arrived just before Operation Hydra, the first air raid against the installation carried out by British bombers during the night of 17–18 August. He and his brother survived unhurt. After the Peenemünde raid, and in light of other devastating 1943 attacks against German war factories, it became obvious to the Nazi leadership that serial production of their new rocket weapon, which the scientists called the A-4 but soon better known as the V-2, needed a location safe from enemy bombs. Addressing these concerns, Wernher von Braun chaired a meeting at Peenemünde on 25 August 1943, where underground tunnels were first considered to mass-produce the A-4/V-2.

The meeting notes still exist, and they also mention using concentration camp prisoners, thus providing the first documentary link of slave labor and the von Braun brothers. At this meeting, Wernher, his deputy Eberhard Rees, and five others debated the merits of using "caves" near Saarbrücken, Germany for missile production: "The workers for the middle and center section manufacture previously planned for VW [the pilot production plant in Peenemünde] can be drawn from the prisoner camp F1. The German supervisory personnel will go along with them." That same day, Magnus flew his brother and the rest of this group to Berlin in a Ju-52 to discuss the initiative further at the Reich Chancellery on 26 August, with top Nazi industrial officials Albert Speer and Hans Kammler in attendance. (Wernher served as co-pilot on the big three-motored transport plane, but he could not command it himself as he lacked a multi-engine rating.)

Immediately following this Berlin conclave, Magnus flew his brother to have a look at the Saarbrücken caves on 29 August, and then on to the town of Nordhausen in the Harz highlands of Thuringia the following day for a personal inspection of the future site of underground missile production. The brothers spent three full days at Nordhausen, returning to Peenemünde on 2 September. Although exactly what they did and whom they met with there is unknown, Wernher certainly must have entered the former gypsum mines located just three kilometers away for the first time. There, two enormous galleries had been bored into a large densely wooded hill that locals called the Kohnstein. Germans had been digging into the Kohnstein's limestone for gypsum since 1917, but in the 1930s these small mining affairs were connected into one big cavity, which the Nazis used to store strategic reserves of fuel, fats and oils. The barrels had now been removed, and the subterranean space stood temporarily empty.

The director of Peenemünde was there to plan how to refit this massive underground space for rocket production. The first shipment of 107 concentration camp workers from Buchenwald arrived inside the Kohnstein on 28 August, before the von Braun brothers reached Nordhausen. The laborers were there to expand the tunnel system for missile manufacture. Wearing black-on-gray striped uniforms and guarded by grim Nazi SS overseers.

Initially, prisoners inside the Kohnstein slept underground on stacked bunks as they excavated, and never saw daylight. There they endured filth, poor food, damp cave walls, cold temperatures, and choking airborne dust constantly replenished by round-the-clock blasting. This last also made sleep for off-shift enslaved workers very difficult. Later, an above-ground concentration camp was established called Dora, initially a subcamp of Buchenwald. As the makeshift Dora facility rapidly grew—it would eventually top out at 40,000 inmates–the prison was administratively detached from Buchenwald in October 1944 to become the independent "Konzentrationslager Mittelbau-Dora." Magnus did not then realize it, but in about a year's time he would be assigned to this subterranean factory space, where he would spend the final nine months of the war managing enslaved Mittelbau-Dora laborers.

As the A-4/V-2 rocket weapon transitioned from development to production in the latter part of 1943, key personnel from Peenemünde began migrating to the Mittelwerk, starting with Magnus's future supervisor Arthur Rudolph in September. Rudolph's initial title at the underground works was Director of Manufacturing and Assembly. In the spring of 1944, he would be promoted to the management board, and given additional responsibility for the rocket's control system sub-assemblies. Back at Peenemünde, Magnus was detached from his chemical work on the Wasserfall project in October 1943 to permanently become his brother's personal assistant and pilot. There were many manufacturing problems at the Mittelwerk over the winter of 1943-1944 due to rushing cutting-edge technology into mass production, and Wernher needed to make frequent visits to the trouble-plagued assembly line. Magnus flew his brother to Nordhausen again in October, November, January, and February. By this time the facility had been incorporated and given the bland name of Mittelwerk GmbH (Central Work Ltd).

== Gestapo arrest ==
Right on the heels of the February trip, a dramatic and important event for the brothers took place. When Magnus flew the Ju-52 from Nordhausen back to Peenemünde on 21 February, there was an order awaiting Wernher to meet with SS leader Heinrich Himmler at Himmler's field headquarters near the Wolfsschanze in East Prussia. At this meeting, Wernher politely declined Himmler's proposal to inject additional funding into the missile program if the young professor would agree to a control transfer from the army to the SS. von Braun's bold rejection of the deal set in motion a power play by the Reichsführer-SS, who was not often refused something he wanted. One month later, Himmler ordered the arrest of Magnus, Wernher, and fellow rocket specialists Klaus Riedel and Helmut Gröttrup, and also Hannes Lüersen, owner of a Zinnowitz home near Peenemünde. The Stettin Gestapo carried out the arrest, probably on 22 March 1944. Charges included defeatism, sabotage, and a treasonous scheme-in-the-making by Wernher to fly off to England with the rocket plans!

The only evidence for these ostensible offenses against the regime was a secret report from an informer who had been watching Wernher for the SS security division, the Sicherheitsdienst (SD), since October 1943. Notes from informer's report were made by General Alfred Jodl, operations chief of the army's high command. During Jodl's briefing by SD agents, he learned that the scientists had made unwise statements during an alcohol-saturated late night party at Hannes Lüersen's Zinnowitz home. Jodl kept notes during the briefing, which still survive in the documentary record. He recorded the SD informant's claims about what the tipsy scientists blurted out during incautious party talk. "Assertions[:] that the war will turn out badly, and regarding their weapon the main task is to create a spaceship. S.D. has assembled material. RF SS [Himmler] has been informed… S.D. wants to know what will happen when all three [Wernher, Riedel, and Gröttrup] are snapped up. The men were treated well, being held in Stettin’s police station holding cells rather than sent off to a harsh Gestapo prison. They were allowed to receive food parcels from Peenemünde engineers who drove over with packages.

Though disconcerting at the time, this arrest and brief imprisonment by the Gestapo would prove to be a boon for the brothers after the war. It became the basis for a widespread postwar mythology promoted by former "Peenemünders" that they were never really interested in helping Germany fight, but instead just played along with the Nazis to get the necessary money to perfect their space rocket. This story would be told many times to many people, and became canon among true believers. There is no doubt that dozens of the rocket specialists were genuinely interested in probing space, and Wernher showed courage by refusing to do what Himmler obviously wanted him to do. However, the actual rationale behind the arrest was typical hard-nosed Nazi bureaucratic infighting. Wernher himself admitted this more than once when relating his most honest versions of the tale. Himmler's intent all along was to use their detention to pressure the German army to turn over control of the rocket program to the SS. This endeavor was ultimately successful later that year.

Himmler had made his point with this maneuver, and when the von Braun brothers’ army boss, General Walter Dornberger, pleaded with Albert Speer to seek Adolf Hitler’s personal intervention in the matter, the Nazi leader soon assented to the scientists’ provisional release after two weeks, with Magnus getting out a few days before the rest. The men immediately went back to work. Wernher promptly had Magnus fly him to Nordhausen in April to discuss quality control with Mittlewerk factory director Georg Rickhey. Thus, the von Braun brothers’ Faustian bargain with the Nazi state continued, yet after their sudden arrest, they must have had felt considerably less sanguine about the strength of their position in the waning days of the Third Reich.

== The Mittelwerk ==
In September 1944, Magnus von Braun saw his life take another dramatic turn when his brother sent him to join the exodus from Peenemünde to the Mittelwerk. As noted previously, this was an underground munitions factory created by drilling two enormous tunnels through the Kohnstein. Each was 1.8 kilometers long, and they were connected by dozens of evenly spaced cross tunnels, like rungs on a ladder. Each cross tunnel had a length of about 160 meters. Full-sized railways had been laid down along the main tunnels; these brought raw materials in and finished rockets out. This colossal chamber provided some 35 million cubic feet of space.

Rudolph made Magnus his engineer in charge of the rocket's center section and tail assembly, where he served for his first three months in the Mittelwerk. By then, serial production had entered a predictable routine. Prisoners from Dora and its smaller satellite subcamps were marched by the SS into the tunnels each dawn to provide slave labor for this huge endeavor. They were mostly Polish, French and Russian, with smaller numbers of Belgians, Czechs, Roma people, and a smattering of other nationalities thrown in. Many were captured resistance fighters and their supporters; others were simply swept up in labor drafts and enslaved inside Dora. The SS handled overall security, assisted in this by German civilian workers who served as foreman on the shop floor. The SS guards of course employed their usual horrific methods. The death toll most frequently cited in the historical literature for Mittelbau-Dora and the Mittlewerk is 20,000, obviously an estimate. However, French historian André Sellier has recalculated this number by adding the devastating prisoner mortality incurred near war's end during forced "death marches" as the SS hastily evacuated the camps. Sellier concluded that "[f]or the whole [Mittelbau-Dora] concentration camp complex, which finally reached about 40,000 prisoners, the loss of human life during a period of about twenty months amounted to some 26,500 victims-—15,500 in the camp and the ‘transports’ and 11,000 at the time of the evacuations."

Magnus's time inside the sub-terrestrial manufactury matches its peak months of production. Prior to his arrival, there had been numerous problems with the still-experimental liquid-fueled rocket which required constant adjustments; many of these had been ironed out, although the troublesome servomotors and occasional air bursts of tested rockets continued. These matters aside, the factory was hitting its production stride as Magnus settled in. Between 1 October 1944, and 18 March 1945, more than 20 completed missiles daily moved out of the tunnels on special flatcars pulled by locomotives. They were then immediately sent west for action. Manufacture peaked during these five months before terminating entirely at the beginning of April, as the Nazi state entered final meltdown.

The same month that Magnus reported to the Mittelwerk, the rocket weapon became operational. At 8:40 AM on 8 September 1944, specialized German missile troops launched a Mittelwerk A-4/V-2 tipped with a one-ton high-explosive warhead from the Belgian village of Sterpigny toward Paris. The first rocket they fired exploded at high altitude after two minutes, a failure. Two hours later they launched a second one, and after a five-minute supersonic flight, it came down southeast of Paris at Charentonneau à Maisons-Alford, where it killed six people and injured 36 more. At 6:36 PM that evening, a different rocket troop operating in the exclusive Hague suburb of Wassener in Holland fired two missiles at the same time, with their gyroscopes set toward London. One was another air-burst, but the other made a quick trip across the Channel at three times the speed of sound and slammed into the West London suburb of Chiswick at 6:41 PM. The resulting explosion ended three lives instantly and seriously injured 17 more. The world had entered the age of ballistic missile warfare.

This revolutionary weapon that Magnus was helping his country deploy was truly terrifying for those on the receiving end. T. D. Dungan wrote a 2005 combat history of the missile, and in it he described what the arrival of a Mittelwerk product on target was like. "[F]irst a ‘whip cracking’ sound of the blast wave was heard, created by the rocket moving faster than the speed of sound, which bounces off the point of impact split seconds before the flash of impact; this was followed by the chaos of the explosion with debris and earth churned skyward. Immediately afterward, as if in reverse order, the whine and rush of whistling air was heard as the sound of the rocket descending through the heavens caught up with the rocket, followed by the roar of the incoming rocket, which tapered off to silence. There could be no warning."

== Accusations of abuse ==
Rudolph shifted Magnus to a new job in November 1944, chief of servomotor production. In the late 1970s, accusations emerged in France soon after Wernher’s 1977 death asserting that he had perpetrated dramatic acts of violence at the Mittelwerk. They accelerated yet further in the 1990s, when prominent Dutch-American astronomer Tom Gehrels published an influential 1994 article in the British journal Nature. Gehrels, who had been a teenager in the Dutch resistance during the war, used notarized statements from former Dora prisoners to assert that Wernher had personally slapped inmates, informed on them to the SS to get them hanged, and walked into the tunnels each morning with his female secretary, side-stepping around piles of dead bodies to reach their offices.

Michael Neufeld, a Smithsonian historian and author of a 2007 biography of Wernher, has tried to evaluate claims by Dora prisoners that they personally witnessed brutality administered by the most famous von Braun. In a 2002 article about Wernher's potential culpability in Nazi slave labor, Neufeld dismissed most claims that Wernher von Braun carried out direct sadistic behavior inside the Mittelwerk as spurious, easily disproven by tracking his known locations during the war. However, Neufeld felt that there were two accusations in particular that merited further study, the second of which might have involved Magnus. "[R]eports that [Wernher] von Braun attended hangings, ordered hangings, attended hangings in SS uniform, etc., have scarcely been discussed in the literature because such testimonies lack credibility," Neufeld wrote. "But in recent years I have received two reports from French Dora survivors that deserve more consideration."

In the first incident, survivor Georges Jouanin, whose job was to climb into upright tail sections of the missiles to install cables to the servomotor, placed a wooden-soled shoe on one of the units. He later recorded that "someone has noticed my wooden-heeled clog atop such a fragile organ, and I feel a hand pulling insistently on the end of my striped pants, thus forcing me out of the tail unit. 'You, out of here, man, you're committing sabotage. You shouldn't step with your foot on this.' I get slapped in the face twice and my head bounces against the metal panels of the tail unit. Cap in hand, I find myself in front of a man in his 30s, rather well dressed, angry, to who I am not allowed to give an explanation. The seven or eight engineers or technicians in the group of which he came out seem disconcerted, astonished... I went back to my work space and the incident seemed over, without consequences. My civilian foreman, MANGER is his name, returns from break and tells me ... 'Our big boss boxed your ears! That was V. Braun.' I answer him: ‘I do not know him, Master! I have only seen him once.’ I never saw him again."

In the second case, an inmate named Guy Morand testified that while testing rocket servomotors, he tried to cover for another prisoner who had mislaid a chronometer, which brought the wrath of an enraged German civilian foreman down upon him. "Like the good Nazi he was," Morand remembered, "he immediately started shouting it was sabotage, when just at that point von Braun arrived accompanied by his usual group of people. Without even listening to my explanations, he ordered the Meister to have me given 25 strokes in his presence by an SS [man] who was there. Then, judging that the strokes weren't sufficiently hard, he ordered that I be flogged more vigorously, and this order was then diligently carried out." Morand went on to say that "following the floggings, von Braun made me translate that I deserved much more, that in fact I deserved to be hanged, which certainly would be the fate of the 'Mensch' (good-for-nothing) I was." Morand adds that the man was "one of the inventors of the V-2" and frequently made "rapid inspections" of his work area.

This description of "von Braun" is closer to Magnus in his role at the rocket factory than that of Wernher, who visited only occasionally. Neufeld raises the possibility of an identity error in Morand's recollections: "In September 1944, Wernher assigned his younger brother Magnus, a chemical engineer and Luftwaffe pilot, as his special liaison to the Mittelwerk, particularly for servomotor production, which was afflicted with serious technical problems. Magnus von Braun stayed in the Nordhausen area full-time until the evacuation of April, 1945. In contrast, his older brother visited the Mittelwerk, by his estimates, twelve or fifteen times in total. Morand gives the time of the incident as the 'second half of 1944,' which corresponds to Magnus von Braun's assignment to the factory, and the testimonial never actually gives 'von Braun' a last name."

In a footnote to this same 2002 article, Neufeld refers to another incident on the record. A Dora survivor named Robert Cazabonne reported "that a fellow prisoner witnessing a hanging in the tunnel pointed out one of the German onlookers and said, 'That's VON BRAUN!'" Neufeld concludes, "We know with near certainty that Wernher von Braun was not there; however, it might have been his brother Magnus, as civilian employees were expected to attend." Magnus was indeed there, as his son Curt confirmed in a March 2020 Los Angeles Times article.

Neufeld continues, "Morand's story necessarily brings Jouanin's identification into question, as both deal with servomotors. Although Jouanin's first instinct on timing was early May 1944, when I wrote him about it, he was less than certain. The description of a man in his thirties he saw only once fits Wernher von Braun better than Magnus, however. In the end, it is impossible to say with certainty that Georges Jouanin's identification of Wernher von Braun can be accepted as meeting a reasonable standard of certainty, as believable as I find it personally. Nor can we conclude with assurance that Magnus von Braun was responsible."

== A mass hanging ==
In November, Rudolph switched Magnus to chief of rocket fin servomotor production. The servomotors were the most troublesome A-4/V-2 component at that time. During this period, concerns over sabotage were at their height, and accusations of deliberate damage became the engineering scapegoat for the servomotors’ technical difficulties. Summary execution was the prescribed punishment for anyone who got caught purposely or accidentally harming missiles. Nearly all resulting executions took place at the Dora camp, and out of view of non-prisoner Mittelwerk employees. However, Magnus witnessed a notorious exception in March 1945. The nine monstrous strangulations that he watched were precipitated when twenty to thirty Soviet prisoners at Dora assaulted an SS guard, briefly escaped, and then were all quickly recaptured by soldiers using tracking dogs. Every one was hanged within a week, but nine were chosen for a special show. They were to be gruesomely executed in Tunnel B near Hall 41, where the rockets were stacked vertically. This location was very close to where Rudolph and Magnus kept office.

The unfortunate men were placed down in the shallow subfloor of the vertical assembly area, while all enslaved laborers, engineers, managers, German civilian workers, and a few curious secretaries were gathered in formation around the pit to watch. French prisoner Charles Sadron described witnessing the impassive Soviets with "their hands tied behind their backs and heads uncovered. A piece of rough wood, like a bit, was shoved between their jaws and kept in place by an iron wire quickly twisted behind their necks. That day there were nine of them, lined up slightly below us, because the precaution was taken to have them go down into the excavation—a foot deep—where a rail switch was located. Hanging above their heads were nine steel ropes, carefully parallel, ending in slipknots while the upper ends were attached to a long horizontal rod used to handle the torpedos [rockets]. The rod was held up in the center by a cable that would—high up beneath the vault—coil around the drum of an electric winch." Sadron continued his grim and detailed remembrance: "Next, the executioner went to his post and grasped the motor’s control gears. Busta [the presiding SS guard] motioned. The motor droned. Gently the strangled men rose as they spun slowly around. The motor stopped when they were a foot off the ground. So that their feet were at the same level as ours. A few spasms barely shook their bodies in which we could imagine the terrible rigidity. but that was not the end: it required more than a minute to die in that way. The young German secretaries who came to watch got their money’s worth. We, on the other hand, had to parade past the skewer looking straight into the faces with their eyes rolled back—at the same height as our own. A fellow prisoner, who took his hat off in respect—received a serious thrashing." After their long death struggle ended, the corpses were left dangling for a full 24 hours, as an example to all shifts of what they could expect if they tried to deliberately damage missiles.

André Sellier has made an interesting observation about this late-war choice to hang Soviet prisoners down inside the tunnel. After all, hundreds of inmate executions by hanging were carried out at the Dora camp during 1943–45, with over 150 in March 1945 alone. Why do this particular one at the factory? The capital crime being punished was not even a sabotage offense. Sellier asserts that "[t]his choice was not necessary if the point was to make an impression on the prisoners. The gallows at the roll call [inside Dora] were more appropriate." Roll call at the concentration camp would obviously maximize the number of inmates who would be present for the grisly object lesson, and that is how it had always been done previously. However, Sellier holds that in the intended audience in March 1945 was different. "It seems that the desire was also to make an impression on the German civilians, whose loyalty to the regime was no longer assured." In Magnus's case, the deterrent had its intended effect. "He witnessed hangings," his son Curt von Braun told an interviewer in 2020. "He felt nauseated but he couldn’t back down or he would have been shot." Certainly, by March 1945, as the Nazi nightmare came crashing down in chaos and blood, such a fate for open refusal was entirely plausible.

== Surrender at Reutte ==
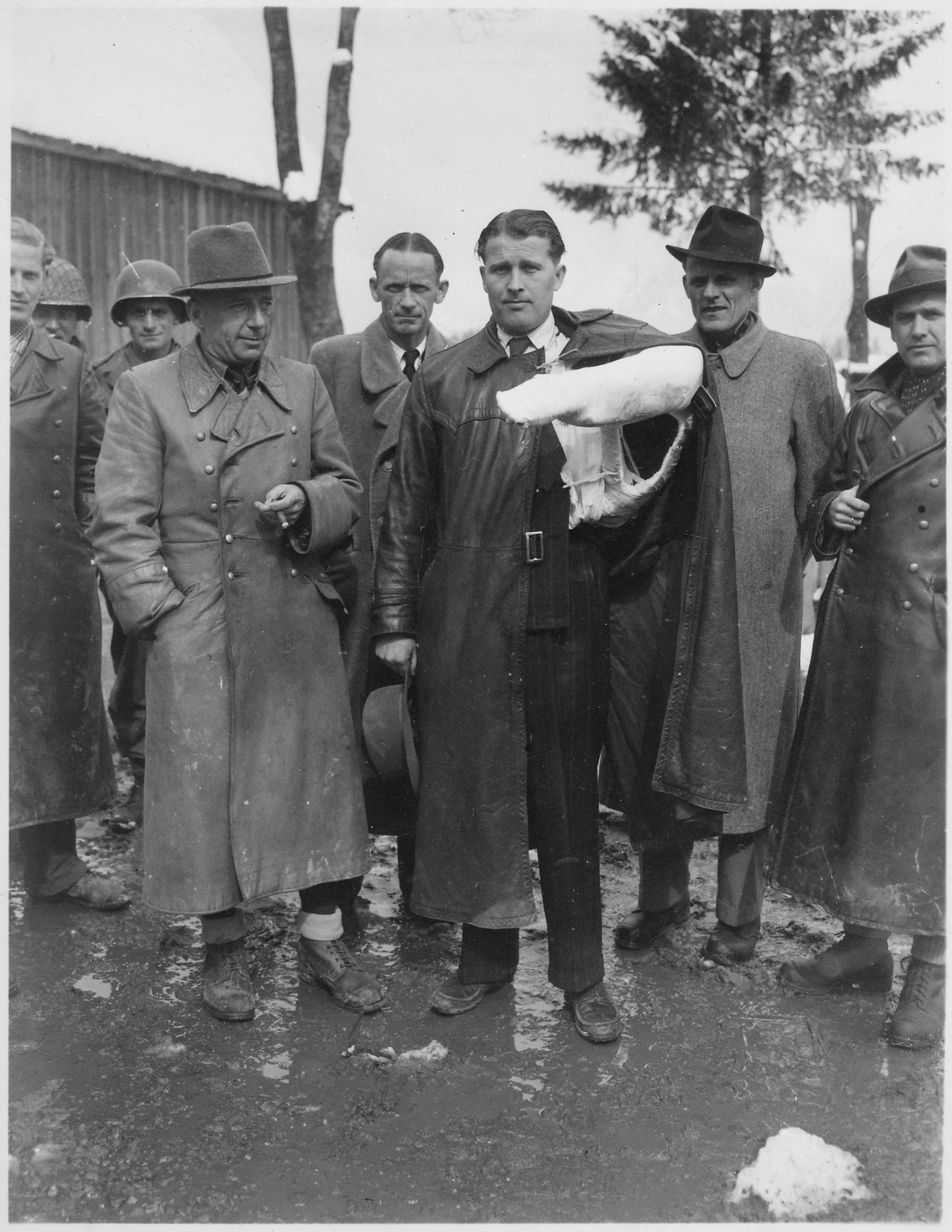
Magnus von Braun (far left, cropped), two U.S. soldiers, Walter Dornberger, Herbert Axster, Wernher von Braun (center), Hans Lindenberg, and Bernhard Tessmann after surrendering to the Allies in 1945

In the spring of 1945, Allied "big arrow" offensives drove into Germany from all sides, and everything fell apart. The raw materials flowing into the Kohnstein tunnels dwindled to a trickle, then stopped altogether. 617 completed missiles had left the Mittelwerk in February, roughly matching the peak rate of the previous four months; in March, production fell to 362, although no records past 18 March survive, so it is unclear how many missiles were actually put together that month. By 1 April, the assembly line had stopped entirely. That day, German civilians undertook a records-sanitizing effort inside their workplace before fleeing from the advancing American army. Prisoner Charles Sadron went into the tunnels on 1 April; he later wrote, "The civilians busied themselves with mysterious work. We were made to rip down notices and signs. We had to hand over written material we had on our persons." It was kindling for a bonfire. When André Ribault descended on 2 April to the office where he drafted technical drawings for the engineers, he saw that "all documents have been burned. Looks completely destroyed. Not a single ‘cigar’ left on the assembly line." This paperwork purge had some success; for example, we know from a wealth of testimony that hundreds of sabotage reports were written, but none has ever been found.

Unfortunately, the nightmare for the inmates was not yet over. Many German civilians employees began fleeing the area by 2 April, perhaps due to an attack by Allied fighter-bombers on Nordhausen the previous day that lasted an hour. Some feared that worse was yet to come. They were correct; Nordhausen was about to be incinerated. On the nights of 3 and 4 April, the British sent massive waves of four-engine heavy bombers to destroy the town. These experienced airman knew how to drop the perfect blend of marking flares, incendiary firebombs and high explosive to create a wind-driven self-sustaining firestorm. For two nights, they deployed their pyrotechnic art over Nordhausen to perfection, burning three-quarters of the town to cinders and killing 8,800 people, of which 1,500 were enslaved laborers at Dora. A few surviving prisoners were able to escape during the second raid, which partially smashed the camp's infrastructure and left a momentary absence of authority.

By the time Bomber Command heavies set Nordhausen afire, Magnus was already gone. On 1 April, Hans Kammler, the fanatical SS general who had taken over the rocket program, ordered an immediate evacuation of 500 key technicians from both Peenemünde and the Mittelwerk to the Bavarian Alps. His purported intent was that the scientists would continue their secret work further away from the front lines. However, the more logical conclusion, as the brothers’ army boss Walter Dornberger realized at the time, was to consolidate the engineers in one location as a bargaining chip, for Kammler to strike a deal that would grease his own final escape. The chosen rocket specialists left both places on the night of 2 April, with Wernher leading the Peenemünde group, and Kammler (plus 200 SD men) escorting his Mittelwerk employees, including Magnus. Their destination was Oberammergau, near the lovely Alpine resort town of Garmisch-Partenkirchen, where Germany had staged the 1936 Winter Olympics.

Traveling at war's end through the rump of Nazi Germany awash in regime dead-enders was not for the faint-hearted, but both groups merged sometime after 6 April, and then headed for the Bavarian ski resort at Oberjoch. SS General Kammler played out his role as crazed zealot until the end. Dornberger later wrote about Kammler's endless supply of energy and enthusiasm for new schemes, which suggests mania or amphetamines, neither of which Nazi fanatics lacked. Kammler "was on the move day and night. Conferences were called for 1 o’clock in the morning somewhere in the Harz Mountains, or we would meet at midnight somewhere on the Autobahn," Dornberger recalled. "[I]f he got impatient and wanted to drive on, [he] would wake the slumbering officers of his suite with a burst from his tommy-gun. ‘No need for them to sleep! I can’t either!"

The bicycle that Magnus von Braun rode to establish contact with American forces upon the surrender of Germany. On exhibition at the U.S. Space & Rocket Center in Huntsville, Alabama.

After hearing the radio report of Hitler's death, Wernher von Braun announced to his group early in the morning of 3 May 1945 that "Magnus, who speaks English, has just left by bicycle to establish contact with the American forces at Reutte. We cannot wait here forever." Dieter Hutzel recalled, "It was quite courageous for Magnus to come down on his bicycle and find the American troops," said Dr. Ernst Stuhlinger, member of the V-2 team. "He had a white handkerchief tied to the handlebars of the bicycle and that was all he had to protect him."

About two in the afternoon, Magnus returned, "I think it went well, I have safe conduct passes and they want us for further interrogation." The Mission Accomplished: The Battle History of the 44th Infantry Division claim that there was a "hectic night of interrogation, plans and counter-proposals" after Magnus von Braun rode his bike downhill in the morning and met members of the "Anti-tank Company, 324th Infantry" "before he went out and in a short time returned with his brother" is inaccurate: Huzel, McGovern, & Ordway, in their researched works, distinctly state Magnus returned about 2 in the afternoon the same day.

Dieter Huzel described the surrender of the group: "Thus, in the dull, rainy, late afternoon of Wednesday, May 2, 1945, seven men [Magnus & Wernher, Walter Dornberger, Axster, Huzel, Lindenberg, & Tessman] ... began their lonely descent from Adolf Hitler Pass toward ... Schattwald. ... Suddenly, around a curve, an American soldier ... waved us to a stop. Magnus got out and showed a piece of paper to the guard ... After about a half an hour, ... we were flanked by two ..."jeeps,"... We reached Reutte after dark. ... The next morning ... we emerged from the mess hall ... several Army photographers were on hand and spent some time taking pictures." During a photo shoot the next day, Magnus von Braun commented "We're celebrating now, but I'll bet they will throw telephone books at us if we ever reach New York. By noon, Magnus von Braun (along with Axster, Huzel, Lindenberg, & Tessman) arrived in Peiting where forty other Peenemünde personnel already had arrived, and the Germans departed for Garmisch-Partenkirchen on 8 May.

== Operation Paperclip and Fort Bliss ==
von Braun arrived in New York on 16 November 1945 aboard the SS Argentina and was soon at work at Fort Bliss, Texas and later at Redstone Arsenal in Huntsville, Alabama. Von Braun was interrogated as a witness for the Andrae war crimes trial in which Mittelwerk general manager Georg Rickhey was acquitted. Soon after his arrival, he was caught trying to sell a brick of platinum he'd stolen from the base to a jeweler in El Paso. The incident was quickly hushed up, though he was informally punished by means of a terrible beating given by his brother Wernher.

== Career with Chrysler ==
In 1955, von Braun began a career with Chrysler—first in the missile division and then in the automotive division. He also resided in Huntsville, Alabama, for a while before moving to Michigan. After living in Michigan, he relocated to the UK, working in London and Coventry as Chrysler UK export director. von Braun retired from Chrysler in 1975 and returned to the States, where he settled in Arizona and resided until his death.
