= Magnus von Braun (senior) =

German civil servant and politician (1878–1972)

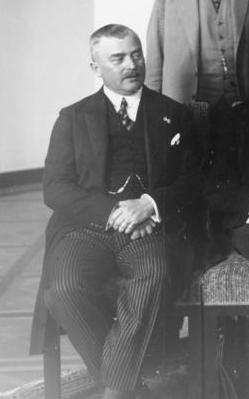
- Born: Magnus Alexander Maximilian von Braun; 7 February 1878; Neucken (now Bagrationovsky District), Province of Prussia, Prussia, German Empire
- Died: 29 August 1972 (aged 94); Oberaudorf, West Germany
- Occupations: Politician; civil servant
- Political party: DNVP
- Spouse: Emmy von Quistorp (m. 1910; died 1959)
- Children: Sigismund von Braun (1911–1998), diplomat; Wernher von Braun (1912–1977), rocket scientist; Magnus von Braun (1919–2003), industrial manager

Magnus Alexander Maximilian Freiherr von Braun (7 February 1878 – 29 August 1972) was a German civil servant and politician (DNVP) whose career spanned the German Empire, World War I and the Weimar Republic. He served as the Federal Minister of Nutrition and Agriculture from 1 June 1932 to 28 January 1933.

He was the father of pioneering rocket scientist Wernher von Braun.

== Biography ==
Magnus von Braun was born at his family's manor of Neucken, an estate the von Brauns had owned since 1803, near Preussisch Eylau (present-day Dubki in Bagrationovsky District, Russia) in East Prussia to Maximilian von Braun (1833–1918) and Eleonore (née von Gostkowski; 1842–1928).

He studied law at the universities of Göttingen and Königsberg and joined the Prussian civil service in 1905, at first at the Department of Trade and Commerce in Berlin. Von Braun was from an old noble family and bore the title of Freiherr (equivalent to Baron and translated as such in English).

Between 1911 and 1915, he was the district chief executive (Landrat) of the Kreis Wirsitz (Province of Posen). He returned to Berlin in 1915 after being given an office with the Department of the Interior.

In September 1917, Braun became the first chief press officer for the Reich Chancellery and later the head of the political department of the military administration of Vilnius.

He became the Stadthauptmann (head of the administration) for the Baltic town of Daugavpils in 1918. Following the conclusion of World War I, Braun was appointed Commissarial Police President of Stettin (now Szczecin, Poland) in 1919. Braun then worked again at the Department of Interior and became the President of the Governorate of Gumbinnen.

He was dismissed from the civil service after the Kapp Putsch in 1920 for his role in the coup.

Braun returned to his family's manor in East Prussia and was active in several agricultural organisations like the Raiffeisen cooperative.

In 1930, he became the Vice President of the Reichsverband der Landwirtschaftlichen Genossenschaften (Association of Agricultural Cooperatives).

On 1 June 1932, he was appointed Weimar Germany's Minister of Nutrition and Agriculture and Reichskommissar for Eastern Aid (Osthilfe) in the cabinet of Chancellor Franz von Papen, a position he kept under Chancellor Kurt von Schleicher until 28 January 1933.

After the Nazis came to power on 30 January 1933, Braun moved to his manor in Silesia, which after World War II became part of Poland and Braun was expelled to Western Germany in 1946.

Braun followed his son Wernher to the United States in 1947, but returned to Germany in 1952, where he died in 1972 at Oberaudorf.

Braun married Emmy von Quistorp (1886–1959) on 12 July 1910. They had three sons:

- Sigismund von Braun (1911–1998), diplomat
- Wernher von Braun (1912–1977), rocket scientist
- Magnus von Braun (1919–2003), industrial manager
