= Christina von Braun =

German cultural historian (born 1944)

Christina Held-Freiin von Braun (born 27 June 1944, in Rome) is a German cultural historian, specialising in gender theory and religion. She was invested with the Order of Merit of the Federal Republic of Germany in 2025.
