= List of Germans relocated to the US via Operation Paperclip =

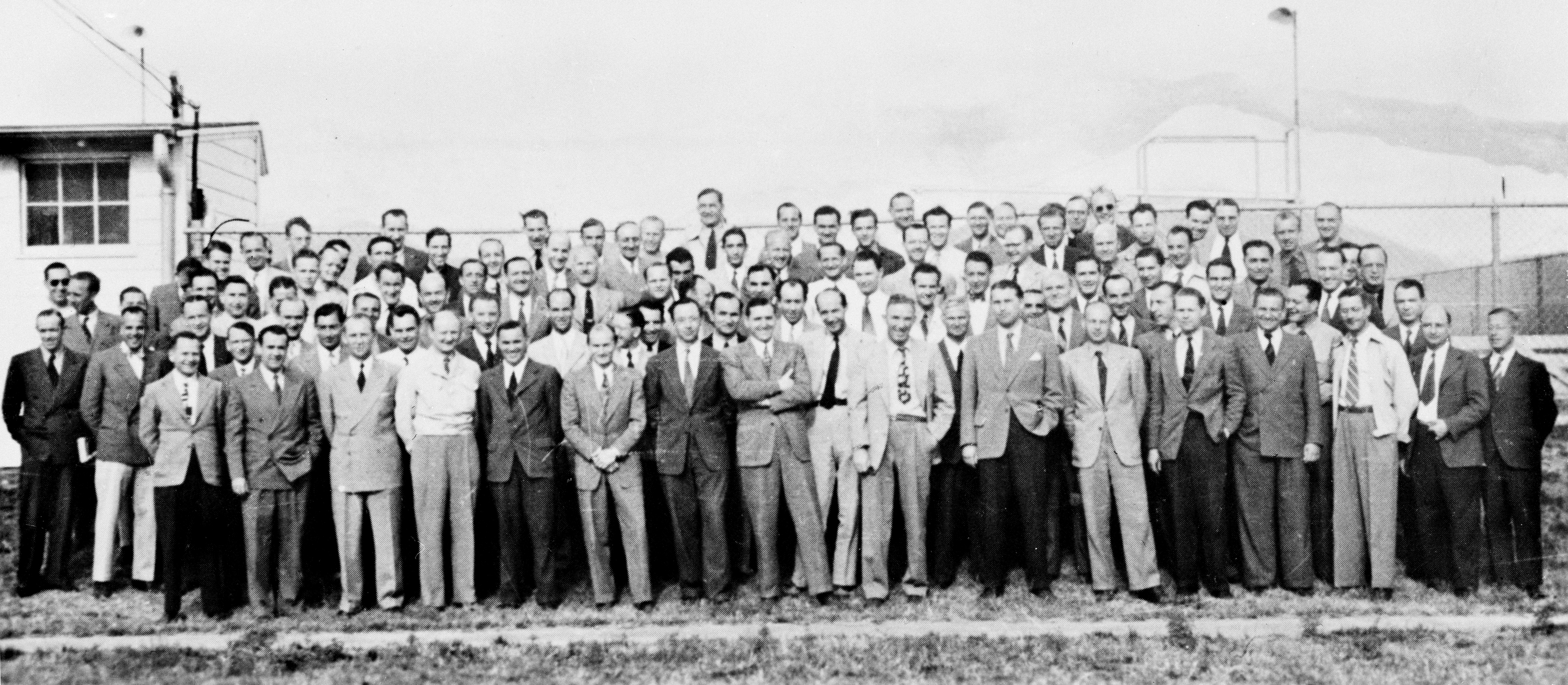
A group of 104 rocket scientists at Fort Bliss, Texas

Operation Paperclip was a secret United States intelligence program in which more than 1,600 German scientists, engineers, and technicians were taken from the former Nazi Germany to the U.S. for government employment after the end of World War II in Europe, between 1945 and 1959. Conducted by the Joint Intelligence Objectives Agency (JIOA), it was largely carried out by special agents of the U.S. Army's Counterintelligence Corps (CIC). Many of these Germans were former Nazi party members and some worked with the leaders of the Nazi Party.

== Key recruits ==
Aeronautics and rocketry

Many engineers had been involved with the V-2 in Peenemünde, and 127 of them eventually entered the U.S. through Operation Paperclip. They were also known as the Von Braun Group.

Hans Amtmann
Herbert Axster
Erich Ball
Oscar Bauschinger
Hermann Beduerftig
Rudi Beichel
Anton Beier
Herbert Bergeler
Rudi Berndt, expert in parachute development
Magnus von Braun
Wernher von Braun
Ernst Czerlinsky
Theodor Buchhold
Walter Burose
Adolf Busemann
GN Constan
Werner Dahm
Konrad Dannenberg
Kurt H. Debus
Gerd De Beek
Walter Dornberger – head of rocket programme
Gerhard Drawe
Friedrich Duerr
Ernst R. G. Eckert
Rudolph Edse
Otto Eisenhardt
Krafft Arnold Ehricke
Alfred Finzel
Edward Fischel
Karl Fleischer
Anton Flettner
Anselm Franz
Herbert Fuhrmann
Ernst Geissler
Werner Gengelbach
Dieter Grau
Hans Gruene
Herbert Guendel
Fritz Haber
Heinz Haber
Karl Hager
Guenther Haukohl
Walter Häussermann
Karl Heimburg
Emil Hellebrand
Gerhard B. Heller
Bruno Helm
Rudolf Hermann
Bruno Heusinger
Hans Hueter
Guenther Hintze
Sighard F. Hoerner
Kurt Hohenemser
Oscar Holderer
Helmut Horn
Hans Henning Hosenthien, Director of Flight Dynamics, Marshall Space Flight Center
Dieter Huzel
Walter Jacobi
Erich Kaschig
Ernst Klauss
Theodore Knacke
Siegfried Knemeyer
Heinz-Hermann Koelle
Gustav Kroll
Willi Kuberg
Werner Kuers
Hermann Kurzweg
Hermann Lange
Hans Lindenberg
Hans Lindenmayer
Alexander Martin Lippisch – aeronautical engineer
Robert Lusser
Hans Maus
Helmut Merk
Joseph Michel
Hans Milde
Heinz Millinger
Rudolf Minning
William Mrazek
Erich W. Neubert
Hans von Ohain (designer of German jet engines)
Robert Paetz
Hans Palaoro
Kurt Patt
Hans Paul
Fritz Pauli
Arnold Peter
Helmuth Pfaff
Theodor Poppel
Werner Rosinski
Ludwig Roth
Heinrich Rothe
Friedrich von Saurma
Martin Schilling
Helmut Schlitt
Albert Schuler
Walter Schwidetzky
Ernst Steinhoff
Wolfgang Steurer
Heinrich Struck
Ernst Stuhlinger
Bernhard Tessmann
Adolf Thiel
Georg von Tiesenhausen
Werner Tiller
JG Tschinkel
Arthur Urbanski
Fritz Vandersee
Richard Vogt
Woldemar Voigt, designer of Messerschmitt P.1101
Werner Voss
Theodor Vowe
Herbert A. Wagner
Hermann Rudolf Wagner
Hermann Weidner
Walter Fritz Wiesemann
Philipp Wolfgang Zettler-Seidel

Architecture
Heinz Hilten
Hannes Luehrsen

Electronics – including guidance systems, radar and satellites

Wilhelm Angele
Ernst Baars
Josef Boehm
Hans Fichtner
Hans Friedrich
Eduard Gerber
Georg Goubau
Walter Haeussermann
Otto Heinrich Hirschler
Otto Hoberg
Rudolf Hoelker
Hans Hollmann
Helmut Hölzer
Helmut Horn
Wilhelm Jungert
Horst Kedesdy
Georg ("George") Emil Knausenberger
Heinz-Hermann Koelle
Max Kramer
Hubert E. Kroh
Hermann H. Kurzweg
Kurt Lehovec
Kurt Lindner
Alexander Martin Lippisch
JW Muehlner
Fritz Mueller
William Mrazek
Hans R. Palaoro
Johannes Plendl
Fritz Karl Preikschat
Eberhard Rees
Gerhard Reisig
Georg Rickhey
Werner Rosinski
Ludwig Roth
Arthur Rudolph
Walter Schwidetzky
Harry Ruppe
Friedrich von Saurma
William August Schulze
Heinz Schlicke
Werner Sieber
Othmar Stuetzer
Albin Wittmann
Hugo Woerdemann
Albert Zeiler
Hans K. Ziegler
Helmut Zoike

Material Science (high temperature)
Werner Osenberg
Klaus Scheufelen
Rudolf Schlidt

Medicine – including biological weapons, chemical weapons, and space medicine

Theodor Benzinger
Rudolf Brill
Konrad Johannes Karl Büttner
Paul Anton Cibis
Fritz Laves
Richard Lindenberg
Ulrich Cameron Luft
Walter Schreiber
Hubertus Strughold
Hans Georg Clamann
Erich Traub

Physics

Gunter Guttein
Willibald Jentschke
Gerhard Schwesinger
Gottfried Wehner
Helmut Weickmann
Friedwardt Winterberg

Chemistry and Chemical engineering

Helmut Pichler
Leonard Alberts
Ernst Donath
Josef Guymer
Hans Schappert
Max Josenhaus
Kurt Bretschneider
Erich Frese

== See also ==
- Allied plans for German industry after World War II
- German influence on the Soviet space program
- Operation Osoaviakhim, USSR operation on German specialists
  - List of Germans transported to the USSR via Operation Osoaviakhim
