= Ernst Stuhlinger =

German-American scientist

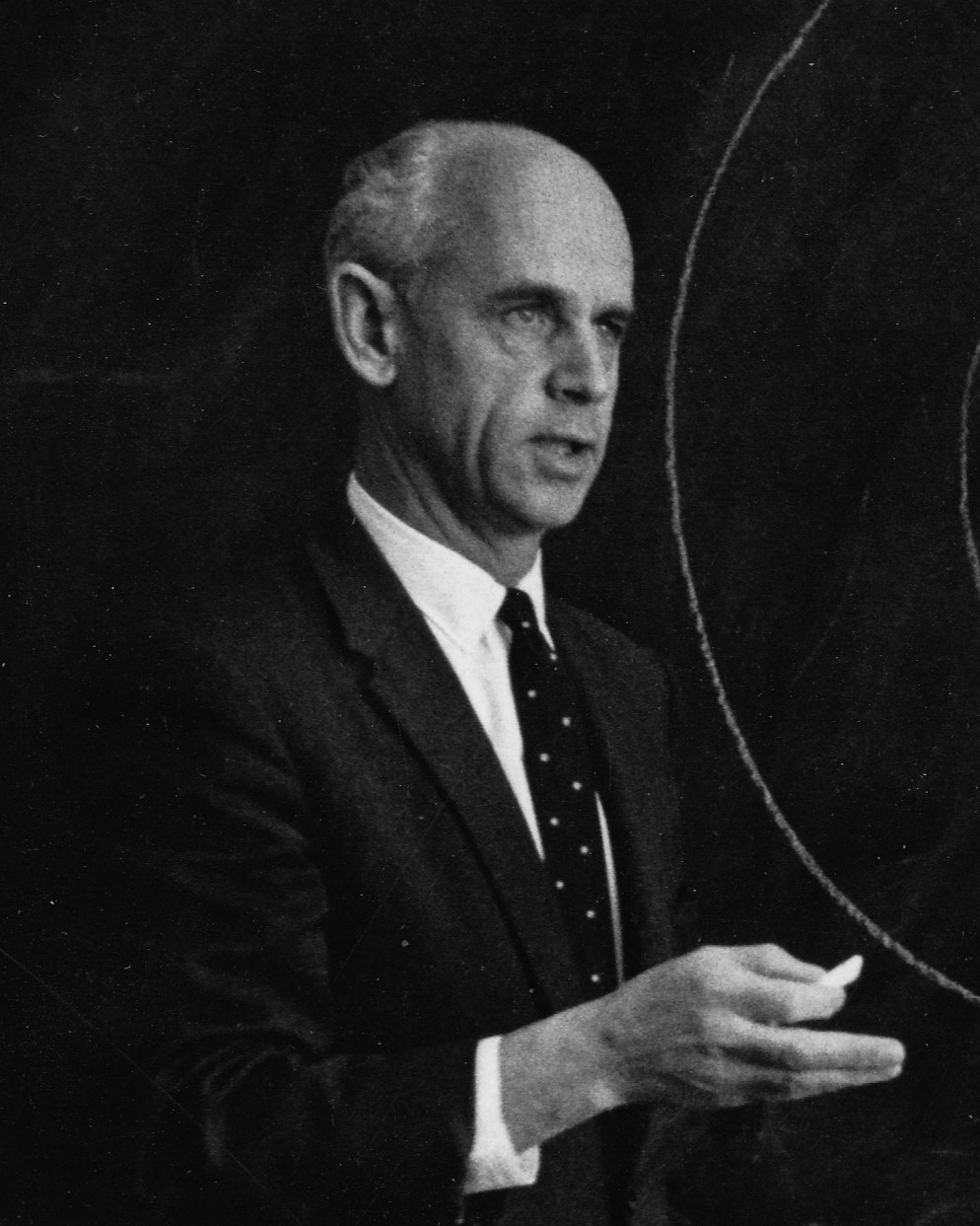
- Stuhlinger in 1962
- Born: December 19, 1913; Niederrimbach, Germany
- Died: May 25, 2008 (aged 94); Huntsville, Alabama, U.S.
- Spouse: Irmgard Lotze Stuhlinger
- Children: Tilman, of Tucson, Arizona, and Christoph, of Monticello, Arkansas; and a daughter, Susanne Schmidt of Heidenheim, Germany.

Ernst Stuhlinger (December 19, 1913 – May 25, 2008) was a German-American atomic, electrical, and rocket scientist. After being brought to the United States as part of Operation Paperclip, he developed guidance systems with Wernher von Braun's team for the US Army, and later was a scientist with NASA. He was also instrumental in the development of the ion engine for long-endurance space flight, and a wide variety of scientific experiments.

== Life ==
Stuhlinger was born in Niederrimbach (now part of Creglingen), Württemberg, Germany. At age 23, he earned his doctorate in physics at the University of Tübingen in 1936, working with Otto Haxel, Hans Bethe and his advisor Hans Geiger. In 1939 to 1941, he worked in Berlin, on cosmic rays and nuclear physics as an assistant professor at Technische Hochschule Berlin, developing innovative nuclear detector instrumentation.

Despite showing promise as a scientist, in 1941 Stuhlinger was drafted as a private in the German Army and sent to the Russian front, where he was wounded during the Battle of Moscow. Following this, he was in the Battle of Stalingrad and was one of the few members of his unit to survive and make the long, on-foot retreat out of Russia in the cold of winter. Upon reaching German territory in 1943, Stuhlinger was ordered to the rocket development center in Peenemünde where he joined Dr. Wernher von Braun's team. For the remainder of the war, he worked in the field of guidance systems.

=== Research scientist ===
Stuhlinger was one of the first group of 126 scientists who immigrated to the United States with von Braun after World War II as part of Operation Paperclip. From 1945 to 1950, he primarily worked on guidance systems in US Army missile programs at Fort Bliss, Texas. In 1950, von Braun's team and the missile programs were transferred to Redstone Arsenal at Huntsville, Alabama. For the next decade, Stuhlinger and other von Braun team members worked on Army missiles, but they also devoted efforts in building an unofficial space capability. He eventually served as director of the Advanced Research Projects Division of the Army Ballistic Missile Agency (ABMA).

In 1954, Stuhlinger assisted in the founding of the Rocket City Astronomical Association (Renamed to the Von Braun Astronomical Society following von Braun's death) where he served as one of the five original directors for the observatory built inside Monte Sano State Park.

On April 14, 1955, together with many other Paperclip members, he became a naturalized United States citizen.

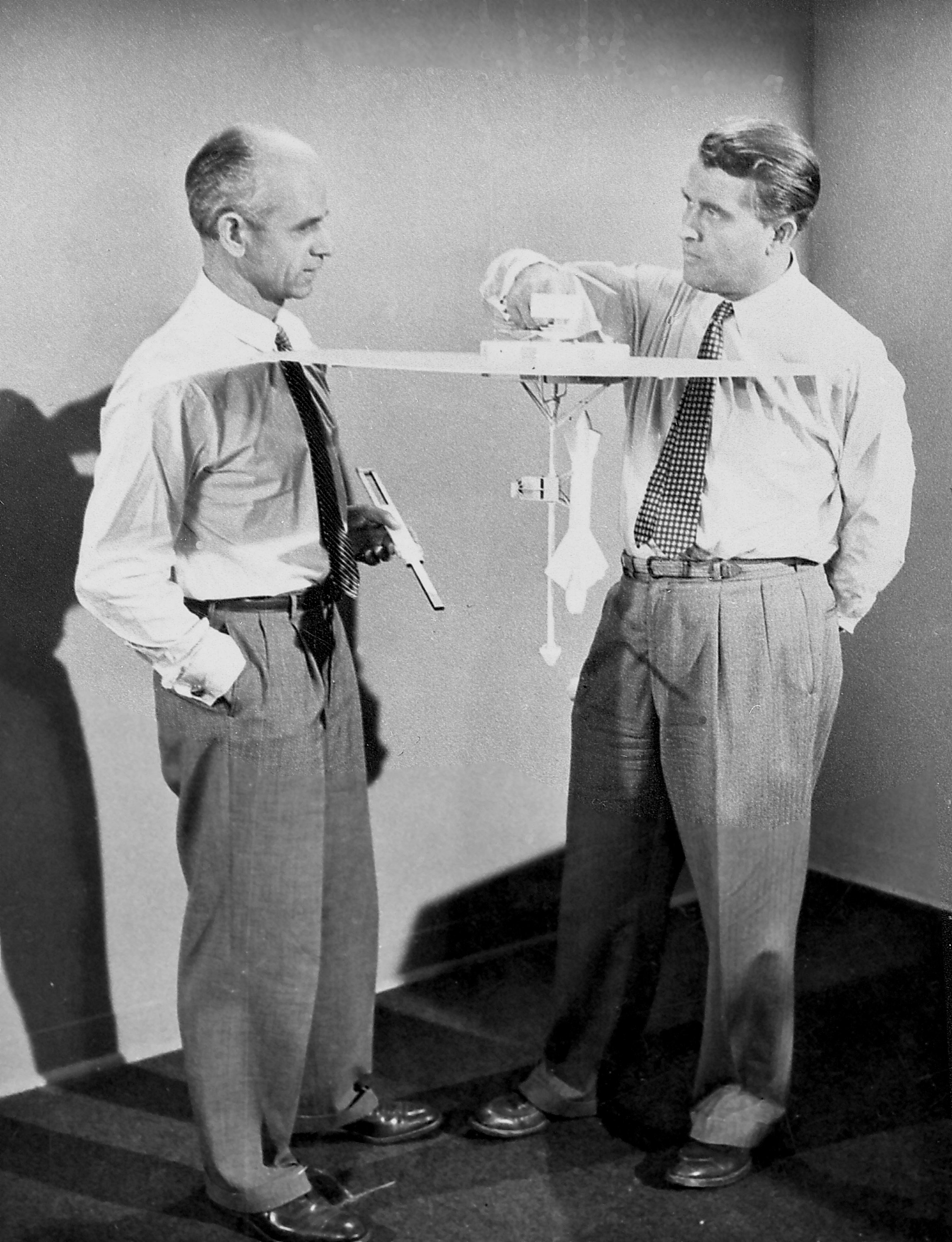
Von Braun and Stuhlinger discuss particulars of the nuclear electric rocket at Walt Disney Studios.

In the 1950s, Stuhlinger, along with von Braun, collaborated with Walt Disney Pictures. Together, they produced three films, Man in Space and Man and the Moon in 1955, and Mars and Beyond in 1957. Stuhlinger worked as a technical consultant for these films.

Stuhlinger played a small but important role in the race to launch a US satellite after the success of Sputnik 1. There was little time to develop and test automated guidance or staging systems, so Stuhlinger developed a simple spring-powered staging timer that was triggered from the ground. On the night of January 31, 1958, Stuhlinger was at the controls of the timer when the Explorer 1 was launched, triggering the device right on time. He became known as "the man with the golden finger." This satellite discovered the Van Allen radiation belt through a cosmic ray sensor, a felicitous intersection with his early physics expertise, included in a science package supervised by Stuhlinger.

In 1960, the major part of ABMA was transferred to NASA, forming the Marshall Space Flight Center (MSFC) in Huntsville, Alabama. Stuhlinger served as director of the MSFC Space Science Laboratory from its formation in 1960 until 1968, and then was MSFC's associate director for science from 1968 to 1975. Among his many other works at Marshall, he directed early planning for lunar exploration, worked on the Apollo Telescope Mount that produced a wealth of information about the Sun, led planning for the three High Energy Astronomical Observatories, and worked on the initial phases of what would become the Hubble Space Telescope.

In 1970, shortly after the first lunar landing, Stuhlinger received a letter from Sister Mary Jucunda in Zambia, Africa, asking how billions of dollars could be spent for space research when so many children on the Earth were starving to death. Stuhlinger's thoughtful response is often cited to justify such expenditures.

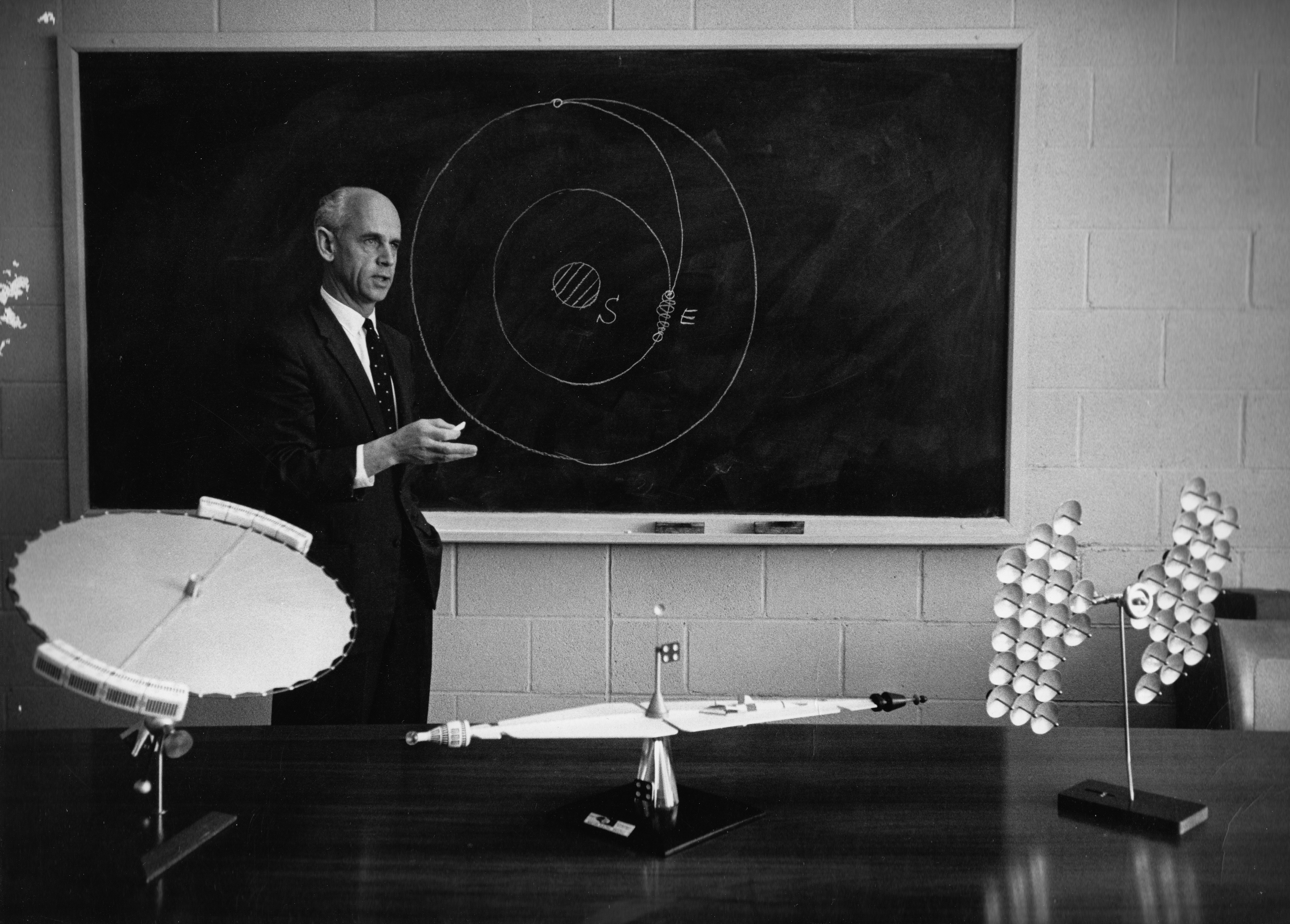
Stuhlinger with models of ion spacecraft he designed

Stuhlinger spent much of his spare time developing designs for solar-powered spacecraft. The most popular of those designs relied on ion thrusters, which ionize either caesium or rubidium vapor and accelerate the positively charged ions through gridded electrodes. The spacecraft would be powered by one kilowatt of solar energy. He referred to the concept as a "sunship". He is considered as one of the pioneers of electric propulsion having, among many contributions, authored the classic textbook Ion Propulsion for Space Flight (McGraw-Hill, New York, 1964). In 2005, he was honored by the Electric Rocket Propulsion Society, and awarded its highest honor "The Medal for Outstanding Achievement in Electric Propulsion", which was renamed the Stuhlinger Medal shortly following his death.

After retiring from NASA in January 1976, Stuhlinger became an adjunct professor and senior research scientist at the University of Alabama in Huntsville (UAH), holding this position for the next 20 years. In 1978, he was at LMU Munich for six months on a Humboldt Fellowship. Ernst was especially proud of winning this award as an American scientist. During 1984-1989, he was also a senior research associate with Teledyne Brown Engineering.

=== Historian ===
Starting in 1990, Stuhlinger and Frederick I. Ordway III collaborated on the two-volume biography Wernher von Braun: Crusader for Space (Krieger Publishing, 1994). In it, Stuhlinger downplayed claims that von Braun had mistreated prisoners working on the V-2 program during the war. Michael J. Neufeld has questioned this version, maintaining that knowledge of V-2 production using forced labor is a fact. Stuhlinger reiterated the point that their aim was ultimately peaceful. In a newspaper article he wrote:

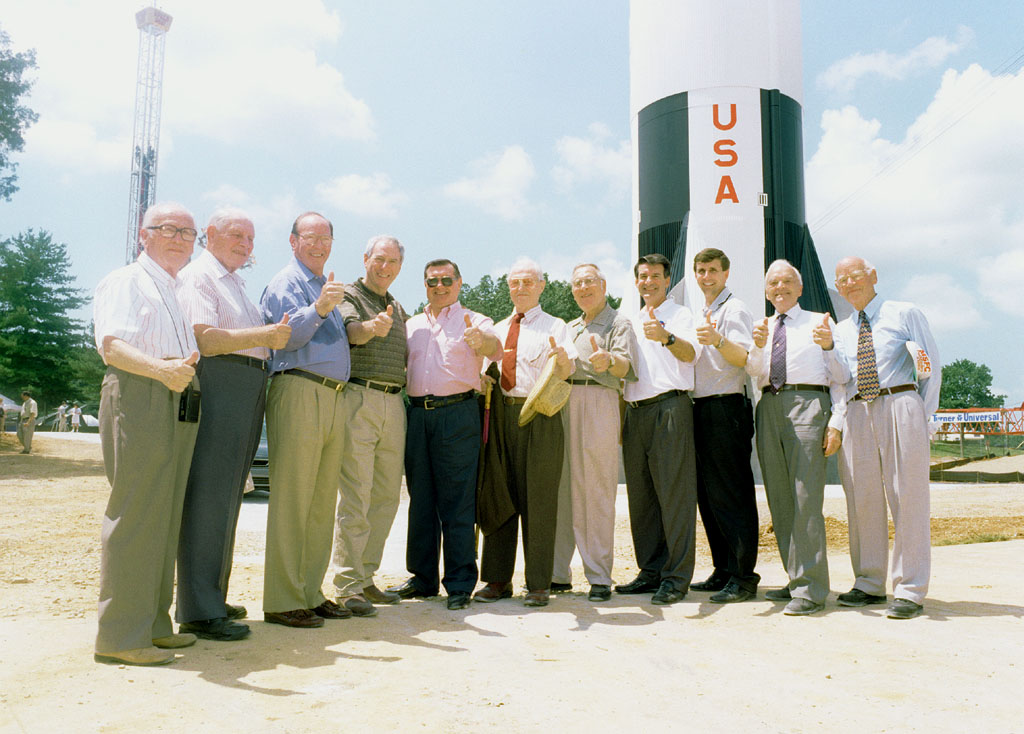
Saturn V dedication, 1999. From left to right: Walter Jacobi, Konrad Dannenberg, Apollo 14's Edgar Mitchell, NASA Administrator Dan Goldin, Apollo 12's Dick Gordon, Gerhard Reisig, Werner Dahm, MSFC Director Art Stephenson, Director of the U.S. Space and Rocket Center Mike Wing, Walter Haeussermann, and Ernst Stuhlinger.

Yes, we did work on improved guidance systems, but in late 1944 we were convinced that the war would soon be over before new systems could be used on military rockets. However, we were convinced that somehow our work would find application in the future rockets that would not aim at London, but at the moon.

Stuhlinger was interviewed in 1984 by fellow Operation Paperclip scientist Konrad Dannenberg and UAH professor Donald Tarter for an oral history series. This hour-long review of their experiences has information on early space programs.

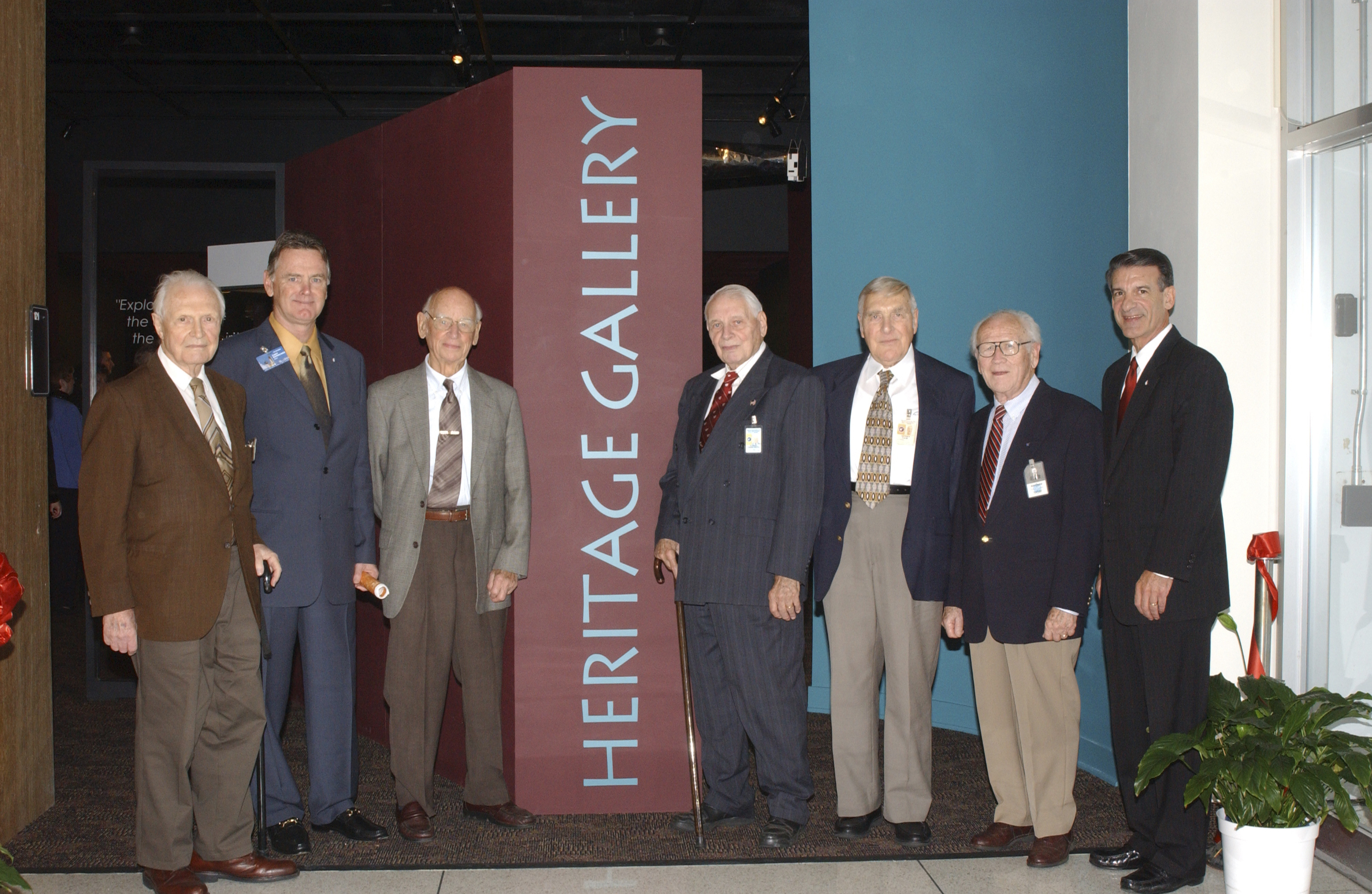
MSFC Heritage Gallery, 2002

In 2004, when he was 90, Stuhlinger helped to raise funds to preserve a Saturn V rocket display at Huntsville, Alabama. Ernst Stuhlinger died in Huntsville at age 94.

== See also ==
- German rocket scientists in the US
- Gridded ion thruster
