= Walter Thiel =

German rocket scientist (1910–1943)

Walter Thiel (3 March 1910 – 17 August 1943) was a German rocket scientist.

Thiel provided the decisive ideas for the A4 (V-2) rocket engine and his research enabled rockets to head towards space.

== Life ==
Walter Erich Oskar Thiel was born on 3 March 1910 in the Silesian city of Wrocław, as second son of Oskar Thiel (civil servant at the German Post) and Elsa (Prinz) Thiel. In 1929 he passed all his school graduation exams (Abitur) with the highest possible grade A. After graduation he studied chemistry at the Technische Hochschule zu Breslau (now Wrocław University of Technology). Due to his excellent work he was exempt from study fees as of the third semester.

In summer semester of 1931 he passed the preliminary examination with excellence. In winter semester 1933 he passed all 7 diploma exams with the highest possible grade A and he became Dipl.-Ing. (chem.). In 1934 his thesis "Über die Addition von Verbindungen mit stark polarer Kohlenstoff-Halogenbindung an ungesättigte Kohlen-Wasserstoffe" (Note: About the addition of compounds with highly polar carbon-halogen bonds to unsaturated hydrocarbons) received the highest possible honor (summa cum laude). He became Dr.-Ing. (chem.). His doctorate was confirmed on 8 November 1934 in Wrocław (source: Walter Thiel's doctorate).

Thiel's Professor in Wrocław recommended Thiel to the Research Institute of the German army ordnance office of under-secretary Prof. Karl Erich Schumann at the University of Berlin. Thiel's previous findings had technological applicability and therefore he was able to continue his fundamental research in a leading position. Late 1934 or early 1935 Thiel became research instructor at Reichswehrministerium. Schumann accompanied many diploma theses and dissertations, including that of Wernher von Braun, who completed his dissertation in 1934. The contacts between the testing ground in Kummersdorf and Schumann's Institute was close, the eastern part of the site in Kummersdorf served as an experimental base for Schumann's institutes, in the west a group of scientists around Major Walter Dornberger carried out their experiments. Here Thiel got to know Walter Dornberger and Wernher von Braun.

In autumn of 1936 Dornberger asked Thiel to move from fundamental research to Wa Prüf 11 at Kummersdorf's western testing ground. All topics regarding the engine were assigned to Thiel, and he had to further advance the propulsion, which he managed in a very short time. In his paper "Empirische und theoretische Grundlagen zur Neuberechnung von Öfen und Versuchsdaten, Schießplatz Kummersdorf Vers. West", (Note: Empirical and theoretical fundamentals for the recalculation of furnace and experimental data, Kummersdorf Range West Test Station) that he presented on 27 April 1937, Thiel introduces developments that lead to decisive changes, including a shortening of the oven and an optimization of the injection nozzle. Furthermore, Thiel continued to research different fuel mixtures for the rocket engines.

In 1937 the first scientists moved from Kummersdorf to Peenemünde. As the test stations were not ready yet, Thiel and his team stayed in Kummersdorf until 1940. After transferring from Kummersdorf to the Peenemünde Army Research Center in the summer of 1940, Thiel became deputy director of the Peenemünde HVP Organization under von Braun. In 1940 many new scientists were recruited to speed up the R&D of the A4. Chemist Gerhard Heller became a very important co-worker of Thiel. They also established private contacts. Other colleagues of Thiel at the development unit included: Hermann M. Bedürftig, Konrad Dannenberg, Werner Dobrick, Hans Fichtner, Werner Gengelbach, Hans J. Lindenmayr, Dr. William Mrazek, Kurt E. Patt, Gerhard Reisig, Walther J. Riedel (Riedel III), Ludwig Roth, Helmut Zoike. After the war, these scientists and others were recruited into United States-government service as part of Operation Paperclip.

In the A4 project, the first successful launch occurred from test station VII on 3 October 1942. The rocket flew 190 km in the targeted direction and it reached a height of 85 km. The top-speed was 1,322 m/s. As the A4 was now showing military qualities, the NS leadership was demanding immediate implementation in war. Mass production replaced science, although the whole unit was still immature. There were many launch failures after 3 October 1942. In 1943 Thiel and many fellow scientists and researchers were very exhausted and unhappy in Peenemünde. Work overload, pressure to succeed and the changeover from a research unit to a production facility started to take its toll on the scientists. Thiel refused to declare the rocket engine ready for mass production. In a letter to von Braun, sent during a trip to a health farm, Thiel described the Aggregat 4: "…where it is more of a complicated lab product than a mass item….". Thiel formulated his protest by handing in his resignation orally on 17 August 1943. He planned to get his professorship at a university. Dornberger rejected his resignation.

During the following night (17–18 August 1943) the Royal Air Force launched a bombing raid of Peenemünde, Operation Hydra. The Thiel family died in a slit trench in front of their home in Karlshagen. Thiel and his family (wife Martha, daughter Sigrid and son Siegfried) were buried at the war cemetery in Karlshagen. Martin Schilling replaced Thiel.

== Legacy ==
On 29 October 1944, Thiel was posthumously awarded the Knight's Cross of the War Merit Cross with Swords.

In 1970 a Moon crater was named after him. It is located on the far side of the Moon and thus not visible from Earth. (Coordinates: 40° 42’ N / 134° 30’ W, mean diameter: 32.0 km). He was one of the first pioneers to be inducted in the “International Space Hall of Fame” in Alamogordo, New Mexico, USA in 1976.

== Aggregate series Development ==
Based on the film cooling ('veil cooling') solution identified by colleague Moritz Pöhlmann at Peenemünde, Thiel designed annular rings of tiny perforations to inject unburnt fuel through the chamber walls at the throat for evaporative cooling to prevent V-2 rocket nozzle erosion.

By 15 September 1941 Thiel officially declared the basic eighteen-pot design of the A-4 motor finished.

Earlier in the spring of 1941, Thiel began investigating nitric acid and diesel oil to be used as the fuel for the 30-ton-thrust A-8 .

Then, on 18 December 1941, Thiel documented the initial A-9/A-10 motor design of six combustion chambers into one common nozzle in Secret Command Document 1496/41.

By the middle of August 1943, Dr Thiel declared that the A-4 developmental problems preclude mass production, recommended the project be abandoned.

Thiel also designed the motor for the Wasserfall anti-aircraft missile.
