= 1942–43 SK Rapid Wien season =

Rapid Wien
1942–43 season
- Coach: Leopold Nitsch
- Stadium: Pfarrwiese, Vienna, Austria
- Gauliga: 6th
- Tschammerpokal: 1st round
- Top goalscorer: League: Hermann Dvoracek (23); All: Hermann Dvoracek (28)
- Average home league attendance: 13,800

The 1942–43 SK Rapid Wien season was the 45th season in club history.

== Squad ==
=== Squad statistics ===
Nat.	Name	Gauliga		Cup		Total	
Nat.	Name	Apps	Goals	Apps	Goals	Apps	Goals
Goalkeepers
(Nazi Germany)	Hans Kovar	4				4	
(Nazi Germany)	Josef Musil	12		4		16	
(Nazi Germany)	Rudolf Raftl	1				1	
(Nazi Germany)	Gerald Schöbinger	2				2	
(Nazi Germany)	Josef Stehno	1				1	
Defenders
(Nazi Germany)	Ernst Happel	3				3	
(Nazi Germany)	Josef Hassmann	6		4		10	
(Nazi Germany)	Rudolf Kaiser	2				2	
(Nazi Germany)	Otto Muhr	1				1	
(Nazi Germany)	Heribert Sperner	16		4		20	
(Nazi Germany)	Erwin Tiefengraber	4				4	
(Nazi Germany)	Stefan Wagner	7		4		11	
Midfielders
(Nazi Germany)	Leopold Gernhardt	11	10	4	2	15	12
(Nazi Germany)	Johann Hofstätter	15		1		16	
(Nazi Germany)	Josef Kirner	3				3	
(Nazi Germany)	Friedrich Nowak	1				1	
(Democratic Federal Yugoslavia)	Stanislaus Orel	7				7	
(Nazi Germany)	Franz Prak	6				6	
(Nazi Germany)	Stefan Skoumal	7				7	
(Nazi Germany)	Engelbert Smutny	9		4		13	
(Nazi Germany)	Engelbert Uridil	7		2		9	
(Nazi Germany)	Franz Wagner	1				1	
Forwards
(Nazi Germany)	Lukas Aurednik	3	1			3	1
(Nazi Germany)	Franz Binder	1	1			1	1
(Nazi Germany)	Hermann Dvoracek	20	23	4	5	24	28
(Nazi Germany)	Hans Erber	1	1			1	1
(Nazi Germany)	Willy Fitz	15	2	4		19	2
(Nazi Germany)	Hans Gossak	2	1			2	1
(Nazi Germany)	Helmut Horn	1				1	
(Nazi Germany)	Matthias Kaburek	6	10	3	4	9	14
(Nazi Germany)	Franz Kaspirek	18	8	3		21	8
(Nazi Germany)	Alfred Körner	4	3			4	3
(Nazi Germany)	Robert Körner	12	1			12	1
(Nazi Germany)	Johann Najemnik	4				4	
(Nazi Germany)	Fritz Roth			1	1	1	1
(Nazi Germany)	Franz Rybicki	7	3			7	3
(Nazi Germany)	Georg Schors			2	1	2	1

== Fixtures and results ==
Win Draw Loss

=== Gauliga ===
Rd	Date	Venue	Opponent	Res.	Att.	Goals and discipline
1	16.08.1942	H	Wacker Wien	4-0	15,000	Gernhardt 14' 57', Kaburek M. 71' 83'
2	23.08.1942	A	Austria Wien	10-1	22,000	Dvoracek 9' 33' 80', Kaburek M. 13' 65' 66' 82', Gernhardt 40' 42' 88'
3	30.08.1942	H	FAC	2-4	10,000	Dvoracek 47', Kaburek M. 88'
4	13.09.1942	A	FC Wien	3-0	12,000	Kaburek M. 24', Kaspirek 65', Dvoracek 71'
5	27.09.1942	A	Admira	3-2	20,000	Kaburek M. 16', Gernhardt 37', Dvoracek 55'
6	04.10.1942	H	Vienna	3-3	32,000	Dvoracek 30' (pen.), Kaspirek 56', Binder 67'
8	18.10.1942	H	Ostbahn XI	2-5	14,000	Kaburek M. 47', Körner R. 61'
9	25.10.1942	A	Sturm Graz	4-0	5,000	Gernhardt 9' 80' 84', Dvoracek 36'
10	01.11.1942	H	Wiener AC	5-1	20,000	Kaspirek 6' 7' 86', Dvoracek 54', Fitz 72'
11	08.11.1942	A	Wiener SC	1-4	22,000	Gernhardt 67'
12	15.11.1942	A	Wacker Wien	4-1	6,000	Dvoracek 27' 46' 76' (pen.), Kaspirek 89'
13	06.12.1942	H	Austria Wien	2-6	8,500	Erber 61', Gossak 90'
14	14.02.1943	A	FAC	1-7	11,000	Körner A. 77'
15	21.02.1943	H	FC Wien	4-6	12,000	Körner A. 3', Dvoracek 23' (pen.) 72'
16	07.03.1943	H	Admira	0-2	12,000	
17	28.02.1943	A	Vienna	4-6	18,000	Rybicki 54', Dvoracek 56', Körner A. 58'
19	11.04.1943	A	Ostbahn XI	3-2	6,000	Dvoracek 15' (pen.) 73', Gratsch 74' (o.g.)
20	18.04.1943	H	Sturm Graz	7-1	6,000	Kaspirek 23', Dvoracek 28' 64' 76', Aurednik 46', Rybicki 71'
21	26.04.1943	A	Wiener AC	0-0	18,000	
22	25.04.1943	H	Wiener SC	3-2	8,000	Dvoracek 7' (pen.) 56', Fitz 24'

=== Tschammerpokal ===
Rd	Date	Venue	Opponent	Res.	Att.	Goals and discipline
Q1	10.05.1942	H	Wacker Wien	2-1	15,000	Roth 3', Dvoracek 7'
Q2	07.06.1942	A	LSV Klagenfurt	4-2	5,000	Gernhardt 32' 42', Kaburek M. 34' 67'
Q3	21.06.1942	H	Wiener SC	4-1	23,000	Dvoracek 40' 87', Kaburek M. 66', Schors 85'
R1	19.07.1942	A	1860 Munich	3-5	20,000	Kaburek M. 41', Dvoracek 56' 75'
