= Charles A. Lundquist =

NASA rocket scientist and historian

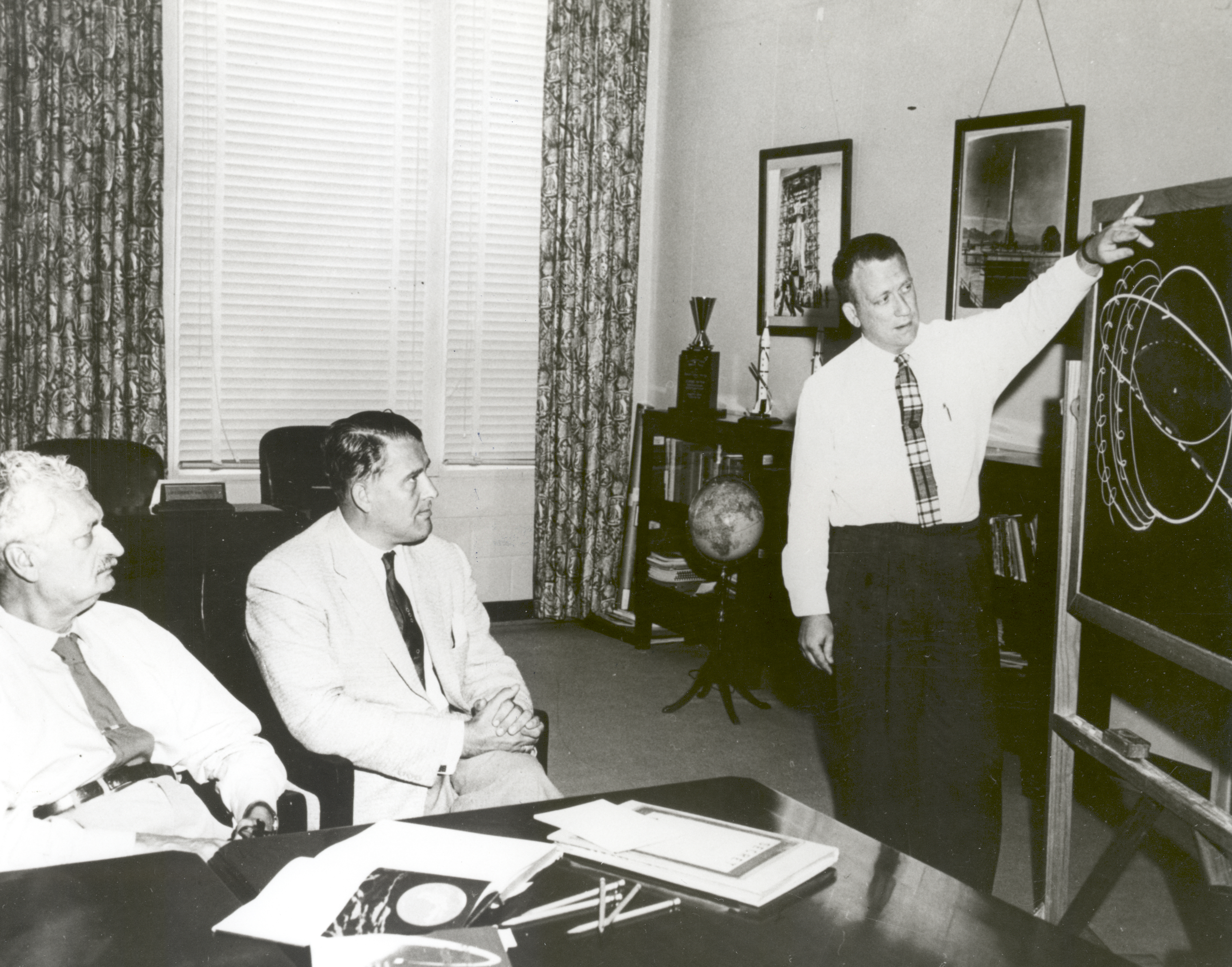
- Lundquist (right) delivers a presentation to Hermann Oberth and Wernher von Braun, 1958
- Born: Charles Arthur Lundquist; March 26, 1928; Webster, South Dakota
- Died: June 3, 2017 (aged 89); Huntsville, Alabama
- Education: South Dakota State University; University of Kansas
- Spouse: Patricia Richardson
- Children: 5
- Scientific career
- Workplaces: Redstone Arsenal, Marshall Space Flight Center, Smithsonian Astrophysical Observatory, University of Alabama in Huntsville

Charles A. Lundquist (March 26, 1928 – June 3, 2017) was an early NASA scientist and program director. He managed research on satellites and rockets at the Army Ballistic Missile Agency, Marshall Space Flight Center, and Smithsonian Astrophysical Observatory. After retirement, Lundquist devoted his time to collecting and documenting early space program history, particularly that surrounding German rocket scientists in Huntsville, Alabama.

== Biography ==
=== Early life ===
Lundquist was born March 26, 1928, in Webster, South Dakota, to Mr. and Mrs. Arthur Lundquist. He completed high school early, in the summer of 1945, in order to enlist in the United States military but changed course after the end of World War II. Instead he enrolled at South Dakota State University, where he graduated with a BS in engineering physics. In 1947, during his time in university, Lundquist first saw the Wernher von Braun rocket team's work at an American Association for the Advancement of Science annual meeting in Chicago. Lundquist entered graduate school at the University of Kansas. While in Kansas, he met Patricia Richardson, whom he married on November 28, 1951. In 1953, he graduated with a Ph.D. in physics.

=== Space program career ===
After graduating, Lundquist worked briefly at Pennsylvania State University as an assistant professor of engineering research, working on homing torpedoes in the school's Ordnance Research Lab. In 1954, he was caught up in a sweeping Army draft of civilians who had previously received deferments; Lundquist had received several during his time as a student. He underwent basic training at Fort Bliss before being assigned to the Guided Missile Development Division at Redstone Arsenal; while working at Redstone, he also taught night classes at Athens College. After completing his two years of Army service, Lundquist took up a civilian position at the newly formed Army Ballistic Missile Agency as chief of the Physics and Astrophysics branch. In 1960, he transferred to the new Marshall Space Flight Center, where he worked in the Research Projects Lab. While with NASA, Lundquist was heavily involved with the development of artificial satellites, working on Project Orbiter and, alongside von Braun, Explorer 1.

In 1962, Lundquist moved to the Smithsonian Astrophysical Observatory in Cambridge, Massachusetts as an assistant director. Lundquist attributed the move to Fred Lawrence Whipple, whom he worked alongside on satellite tracking. As assistant director, Lundquist coordinated the SAO's scientific investigations while remaining a member of the NASA Group for Lunar Exploration Planning.

Lundquist returned to the MSFC in 1973 to fill the role of director of the Space Sciences Lab, replacing the former director Gerhard B. Heller who had died in an automobile accident. Lundquist was involved with the Skylab and Space Shuttle projects; he also worked on the Consort and Joust series of sounding rockets. As director, Lundquist grew increasingly disappointed with what he saw as NASA's tendency to, rather than evolve old projects, scrap them and begin new one from scratch, and he ultimately retired from the MSFC in 1981.

=== Post-retirement work ===
After retiring, Lundquist joined the University of Alabama in Huntsville, filling a number of research roles including Associate Vice President for Research and Director of the Interactive Projects Office. He contributed a large amount of physical research and documents to the school's Salmon Library and Archives; he also recorded a series of oral interviews with early American and German rocket scientists. Lundquist retired from UAH in 2000 but continued to work at the school until his death in 2017, including publishing a book, Transplanted Rocket Pioneers, collating history on German rocket scientists in Huntsville.
