= Werner Dahm =

German-American spaceflight scientist

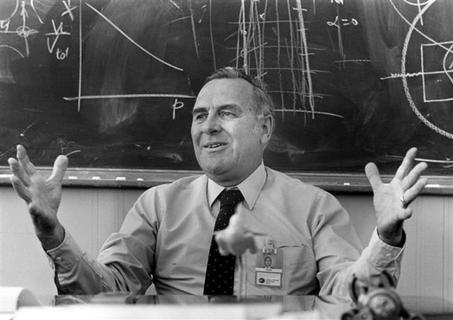
- Werner Dahm at NASA in 1968
- Born: February 16, 1917; Lindenthal (Cologne), Germany
- Died: January 17, 2008 (aged 90); Huntsville, Alabama, United States
- Education: 1947 Technical University of Aachen
- Awards: 1997 AIAA Aerodynamics Award; 2003 NASA Exceptional Service Medal
- Scientific career
- Fields: Aerodynamics, Aerothermochemistry
- Workplaces: 1939–1941 Heer signal corps 1941–1945: Peenemünde; 1947–1956: Ordnance Corps; 1956–1960: ABMA; 1960–2006: MSFC: Aerodynamics Analysis Branch, Chief (1960); Aerophysics Division, Chief; Chief Aerodynamicist (1992); Space Transportation Directorate (2004)

Notes
- Patents: a Wind Measurement System, a Focused Laser Doppler Velocimeter and a Clean Air Turbulence Detector. Parents: Anton Dahm and Maria Morkramer; Spouse: Kaethe Elizabeth Maxelon (1955), Nell Sheppard Carr (1981); Children: Stephan, Werner J A, Martin, & Thomas: "America's space program is preeminent because folks like Mr. Dahm contributed to building it into the best in the world. His life and life's work are an example of his energy, dedication and humble leadership, which has played a significant role in humanity's peaceful use of space" (David A. King, MSFC director)

Werner Karl Dahm (February 16, 1917 in Lindenthal, Germany – January 17, 2008 in Huntsville, Alabama) was an early spaceflight scientist of the Peenemünde Future Projects Office who emigrated to the US under Operation Paperclip and was the Marshall Space Flight Center Chief Aerodynamicist.

== Life ==
Werner Karl Dahm was born on Feb. 16, 1917 in Lindenthal near Köln, Germany, the son of Anton Dahm and Maria Morkramer. The family moved to Bonn later that year. His father was the first engineer in a long line of merchants. After graduating from the Beethoven School in Bonn in 1936, he studied aerodynamics and aircraft design at the Technical University in Aachen, and later in Munich when the Nazis had closed other technical universities. In Munich he was one of just four students, out of several hundred, who refused to join the Nazi student club. He said he first simply pretended not to find it, and then since it was formally listed as a dueling club he avoided it by claiming religious objections. For this he was denied access to certain advanced aircraft courses, so he focused on courses relevant to rocketry. Before completing his degree he was drafted at the end of 1939, and sent with a signal corps unit to France and then to Czechoslovakia. In between, he was granted a one-semester break to complete the major part of his aerodynamics degree.

As a result of his technical background, in late 1941 he was assigned to the German rocket development effort at Peenemünde, led by Wernher von Braun. There, as the youngest member of the rocket team, he worked in the future projects division, a group composed mainly of physicists who needed a specialist in aerodynamics. At the time, theoretical understanding of high-speed aerodynamics was still in its infancy. He was one of a group that conducted pioneering experiments in a small supersonic wind tunnel to obtain essential insights and data to support designs for proposed new rockets. Among these was the A9/A10 rocket, designed to be the first intercontinental ballistic missile, based on a Mach 6 boost-glide approach using a winged derivative of the V2 rocket. He soon recognized in the wind tunnel results that a rearward shift occurred in the aerodynamic center-of-pressure as the rocket transitioned to supersonic speeds, which would cause it to become too stable for the relatively weak control surface actuators to retain sufficient authority to control the missiles course. This led to experiments and theories to understand the shift and determine aerodynamic configurations that would allow the rocket to remain stable.

He also worked on the Wasserfall rocket, a radar-guided supersonic anti-aircraft missile, in which the same center-of-pressure shift was being encountered. Along the way, he developed a conical rocket propellant tank that successfully overcame liquid fuel sloshing problems, for which he won an internal prize with a monetary award that he proudly never cashed. In August 1943, when Allied forces bombed the Peenemuende facilities, he received a commendation for saving critical wind tunnel data during the ensuing fires. The Wasserfall project continued almost to the war's end, and the rocket was successfully flown but never went into production. In 1944, he and others in the group were granted civilian status, and resumed the A9/A10 development effort. In January 1945, near the end of the war, two A9 test rockets were launched with control surface designs based on the group's solution to the center-of-pressure shift. The second of these achieved stable transition to supersonic flight.

Facing advancing Russian forces at the beginning of February 1945, he and most others on the rocket team moved to Oberammergau to allow a surrender to American forces. After his release in August 1945, he briefly worked in a candle factory of family friends in Bonn, until accepting an invitation from the U.S. as part of Operation Paperclip to join the U.S. Army's nascent rocket program with other members selected from von Braun's team. He insisted, however, on first being allowed to finish his degree, which was officially awarded in mechanical engineering due to postwar restrictions on further rocket work in Germany. In August 1947 he rejoined the other scientists from the von Braun team at Fort Bliss, Texas to begin work on the U.S. rocket program.

In the U.S. he was initially involved in tests at White Sands Missile Range using V2 rockets. These results led directly to the Redstone rocket and laid the basis for every other rocket developed in the United States since. The White Sands work included a Mach 3 cruise missile known as the Hermes II, based on a V2 first stage with a radical linear ramjet concept for the second stage. His work on the Hermes II continued after he moved in 1950 with much of the von Braun team to Huntsville, Ala. as part of the Army's ballistic missile program. There he developed the external aerodynamic design for the Army's Redstone missile, which served as the launch rocket for the nation's first live nuclear missile tests and later also launched the first U.S. astronaut into space. He developed a successful Mach 5 ballistic re-entry nose cone using a purely theoretical approach, at a time when no hypersonic wind tunnels existed to test the theories or provide needed data. He subsequently continued pioneering contributions in high-speed aerothermochemistry in the Army's Jupiter intermediate-range ballistic missile program, and then on the Army's Pershing medium-range ballistic missile and the large Saturn I booster rocket.

Following the Russian Sputnik launch, in July 1960 he moved with other von Braun rocket scientists from the Army Ballistic Missile Agency to the newly founded NASA. There, as part of the Apollo Moon landing program, he made major contributions working on the Saturn V booster rocket, on aerothermodynamics, and on liquid hydrogen propellant systems. He subsequently was involved in numerous projects contributing to the nation's crewed and uncrewed space flight programs, especially Skylab and the Space Shuttle. In the Shuttle development effort he led a team working on vehicle aerodynamics and the main engines, which included developing full-scale component tests and scaling methodologies, and applying computational fluid dynamics to overcome a wide range of aerothermochemistry problems.

He was Chief of the Aerophysics Division at NASA's Marshall Space Flight Center until 1992, when he became Chief Aerodynamicist at the NASA Center. He was awarded the AIAA Aerodynamics Award in 1997 for his exceptional lifetime contributions to the aerodynamic design and analysis of strategic missiles and crewed/uncrewed launch rockets, and received the NASA Exceptional Service Medal in 2003. He continued working in science positions at NASA until his retirement, at 89, in 2006. David King, director of NASA's Marshall Space Flight Center, said "America's space program is preeminent because folks like Mr. Dahm contributed to building it into the best in the world. His life and life's work are an example of his energy, dedication and humble leadership, which has played a significant role in humanity's peaceful use of space."

== Publications ==
- Ordway III, Frederick I; Dahm, Werner K; Konrad Dannenberg; Walter Haeussermann; Reisig, Gerhard; Ernst Stuhlinger; Georg von Tiesenhausen; Willhitee, Irene (January 2007). "A memoir: From peenemünde to USA: A classic case of technology transfer". Acta Astronautica. 60 (1). Elsevier: 24–47. Bibcode:2007AcAau..60...24O. doi:10.1016/j.actaastro.2006.05.003.
