= Stuhlinger Medal =

Stuhlinger Medal (The Ernst Stuhlinger Medal for Outstanding Achievement in Electric Propulsion )
- Awarded for: Outstanding contributions to the science, technology or development of electric propulsion for spacecraft
- Presented by: The Electric Rocket Propulsion Society (ERPS)
- First award: 2005

The Stuhlinger Medal, whose official name is the "Ernst Stuhlinger Medal for Outstanding Achievement in Electric Propulsion", is the highest honor in the field of electric propulsion for spacecraft bestowed by the Electric Rocket Propulsion Society (ERPS), the main professional society in that field, to persons who made outstanding contributions to the science, technology or development of electric propulsion.

The Stuhlinger Medal was established by the ERPS in 2005 as the "Medal for Outstanding Achievement in Electric Propulsion", then renamed after its first recipient Ernst Stuhlinger (1913–2008), the German-born American rocket scientist, shortly after his death in 2008. The medal is typically awarded every two years during the ERPS's main conference, the International Electric Propulsion Conference.

== Recipients ==
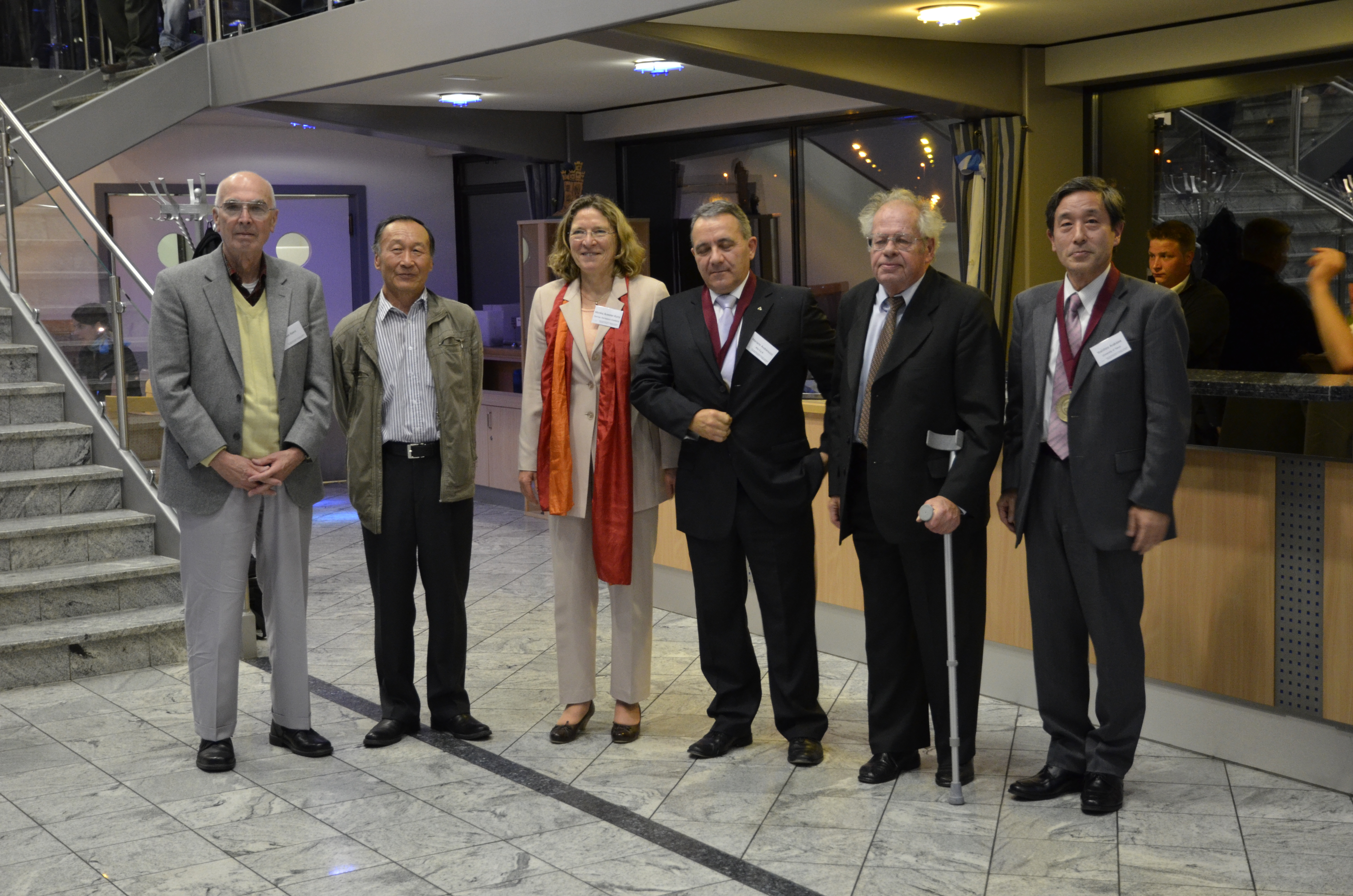
Former recipients of the Stuhlinger Medal during the 2011 award ceremony

Recipient name	Country of origin	Year of award	Comment
Mariano Andrenucci	Italy	2011	For his contributions to the theory and testing of various electric propulsion concepts and for his invaluable role in educating generations of scientists and leaders in electric propulsion
Yoshihiro Arakawa	Japan	2011	For his contributions to the understanding and control of disruptive plasma behavior in EP devices and his leading role as an EP educator in Japan
Monika Auweter-Kurtz	Germany	2009	For her sustained and productive record of contributions to various aspects of electric propulsion research and education
John R. Brophy	USA	2015	In recognition of his contributions to the theory and testing of various electric propulsion concepts and his leadership in the development of the ion propulsion system for the DAWN mission
David "Dave" C. Byers ✝	USA	2007	For his vision, and many contributions to the advancement of electric propulsion
Alec D. Gallimore	USA	2022	For exemplary contributions to the understanding of EP physics and greatly expanding the scale of EP educational capabilities
Dan M. Goebel	USA	2022	For his outstanding contributions to the development of ion and Hall thruster technology and dissemination of EP knowledge
Vlad Hruby	USA	2024	In recognition of his sustained technical and leadership contributions to Electric Propulsion technologies and flight programs
Robert G. Jahn ✝	USA	2005	For his elucidating work on the fundamentals of electromagnetic plasma propulsion, and for his continuing legacy in EP education
Harold R. Kaufman ✝	USA	2005	For his landmark development work on the electron-bombardment ion thruster, and for his innovative solutions to numerous problems in ion propulsion
Vladimir Kim	Russia	2007	For his contributions to the solution of numerous technical problems in Hall propulsion
Hitoshi Kuninaka	Japan	2013	For his leadership in the development of the microwave ion thruster system and of the Hayabusa Mission, the world's first asteroid sample return
Kyoichi Kuriki	Japan	2005	For his leadership and technical contributions to EP research and space testing
Horst W. Loeb ✝	Germany	2005	For his landmark work on the radio-frequency ion thruster
Manuel Martinez-Sanchez	USA	2025	For his outstanding contributions to the research and development of electric propulsion and his tireless education of the next generation electric propulsion engineers
Alexei I. Morozov	Russia	2005	For his contributions to the understanding and development of Hall thrusters, and for his original ideas in EP
Roger M. Myers	USA	2017	For sustained technical and leadership Contributions to Electric Propulsion Technologies, Programs, and Applications
Garri A. Popov	Russia	2019	For sustained technical and leadership Contributions to Electric Propulsion Technologies, Programs, and Applications
Ernst Stuhlinger ✝	Germany; USA	2005	For his seminal theoretical work on ion propulsion
Paul J. Wilbur ✝	USA	2007	For his seminal work and many classic contributions to ion propulsion, and for his invaluable role in EP education
Askold V. Zharinov	Russia	2011	For his pioneering work on ExB plasma acceleration leading to his invention and development of the Thruster with Anode Layer (TAL)

== See also ==
- List of engineering awards
