= Herbert Axster =

German lawyer

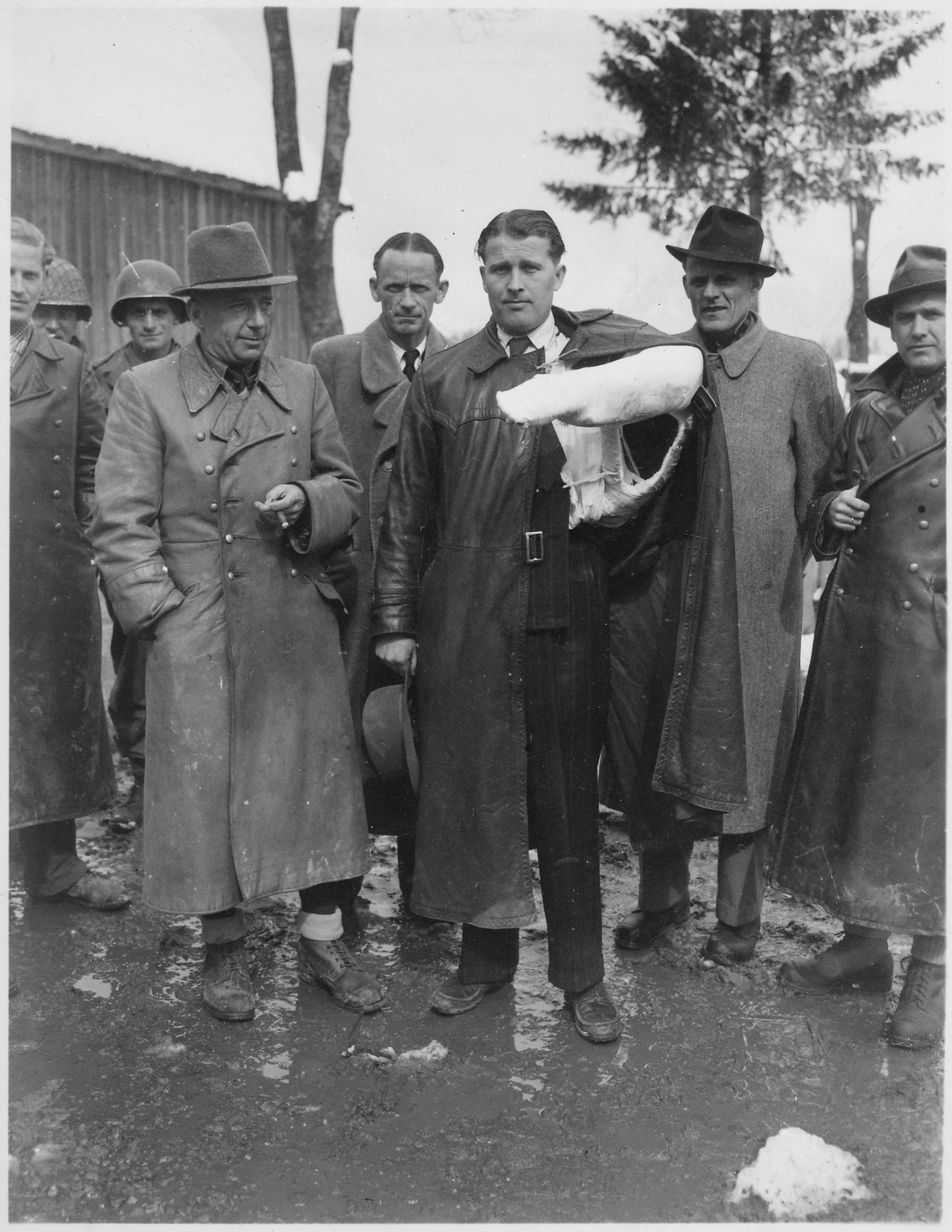
- Herbert Axster (fifth from left) with Magnus von Braun (far left, cropped), two U.S. soldiers, Walter Dornberger, Wernher von Braun (center), Hans Lindenberg, and Bernhard Tessmann after surrendering to the Allies in 1945
- Born: 11 March 1899
- Died: 25 May 1991 (aged 92); Düsseldorf, Germany
- Occupation: Lawyer

Herbert Axster (3 November 1899 – 25 May 1991) was a German lawyer and Nazi connected with Operation Paperclip. Axster served as chief of staff in the German guided missiles program.

== Wartime and Postwar Activities ==
During World War II, Axster served as chief of staff to Walter Dornberger, commander of the Peenemünde Army Research Center. Here, Axster assisted with the development of Germany's V-2 rocket program. Following Nazi Germany's surrender, Axster was sent to the United States in November 1945. In January 1947, he began work for the U.S. Government at Fort Bliss, Texas.

== OMGUS Investigation ==
Following his recruitment into Operation Paperclip, Axster was investigated by the Office of Military Government, United States (OMGUS) as a possible threat to the United States. The 1948 OMGUS report on Axster included interviews with individuals who had been familiar with Axster during the war. The interviews appeared to describe a sadistic man, said to have used slave labor on his private estate. In addition, the report included mention of Axster's wife, who was an outspoken proponent of the Nazi Party. However, the report concluded by reversing OMGUS's initial position concerning Axster, stating that "[Axster] was not a war criminal and was not an ardent Nazi. The record of Herbert Axster as an individual is reasonably clear and as such, it is believed that he constitutes no more of a security threat than do the other Germans who have come to the U.S. with clear records in entirety." Axster was allowed to continue his work for the U.S. government.
