= Paul Anton Cibis =

Clinical ophthalmologist and surgeon

Paul Anton Cibis (26 June 1911 – 30 April 1965) was a clinical ophthalmologist, surgeon and pioneer of modern vitreoretinal surgery. As part of Operation Paperclip Cibis came to the United States and performed research for the U.S. Air Force and studied the effects of atomic weapons testing on the eye. He was an internationally recognized expert in retinal detachment surgery and pioneered the use of liquid silicon for this procedure.

== Life and times ==
Cibis was born in 1911 at Rybnik, Silesia, Germany. In 1921, this became part of Poland. Prior to entry into university, he studied in Rybnik and Racibórz Silesia. Cibis then studied medicine at the University of Breslau and at Munich. He attended University of Berlin for medical school. He interned at Berlin and completed residency at Heidelberg. At Heidelberg he met his future wife Lisa, a medical student who became an ophthalmologist. The couple married in 1939. Lisa held membership in the German Ophthalmological Society. Later, they had a daughter and son and both children pursued careers in ophthalmology after studying medicine at Washington University School of Medicine. From 1940 to 1944, he held the position of research and clinical assistant in the University Eye Clinic at Heidelberg. Upon appointment to Heidelberg, and at the outbreak of World War II, Cibis was quickly drafted into the German Army (Wehrmacht). He served on the Russian front for two years, as an ophthalmologist and medical administrator. From 1944 to 1949, Cibis was Oberarzt and Docent for Ophthalmology at Heidelberg. During the years 1949 to 1955, he was a research ophthalmologist for the United States Air Force, School of Aviation Medicine at Randolph Field in Texas. From 1 June 1955 to 1 June 1956, Cibis was an instructor in ophthalmology at Washington University School of Medicine. From 1956 to 1965, he held the position of associate professor of ophthalmology at Washington University School of Medicine. In 1965, he died of a heart attack at St. Louis, Missouri shortly after his return from England where he had attended the Annual Meeting of the Ophthalmological Society of the United Kingdom.

== Education ==
His initial education was in Rybnik and then in Racibórz Silesia. In 1931, Cibis began studies in medicine at the University of Breslau and continued for two additional years in Munich. Upon completion, he attended medical school at the University of Berlin and graduated on 4 December 1936. His internship was at Berlin in 1937. In 1938, he went to Heidelberg for residency at the University Eye Clinic. In 1940, Cibis completed residency in ophthalmology at the University of Heidelberg Eye Clinic. Until 1949, he was chief assistant in ophthalmology at the Eye Clinic.

== School of Aviation Medicine ==
In June 1949, he came to the United States as a research ophthalmologist at the United States Air Force School of Aviation Medicine at Randolph Air Force Base in Texas under Operation Paperclip. The work involved the visual and physiological problems of aviation, space travel and atomic weapons testing, including flashblindness. Cibis worked with Werner K. Noell to study the ocular effects from high intensity x-radiation. He paired with David V.L. Brown to analyze the retinal changes as a result of ionizing radiation. The team of Cibis, Brown and John E. Pickering utilized Rhesus monkeys to study the effect of gamma radiation on the retina. The joint efforts from Byrnes, Brown, Rose and Cibis studied retinal burns, chorioretinal burns and flashblindness that resulted from atomic weapons tests. The group was interested in the biological effects of atomic weapons. Much of this work was performed as part of Operation Redwing. Cibis worked with the Air Force until 1955. In 1955, Dr. Bernard Becker offered Cibis a position in the Department of Ophthalmology at Washington University School of Medicine.

== Washington University in St. Louis ==
In 1955, he was recruited by Dr. Bernard Becker to become a member of the Department of Ophthalmology at Washington University School of Medicine. From 1 June 1955 to 1 June 1956, Cibis was an instructor in ophthalmology at Washington University School of Medicine. From 1956 until 1965, he was associate professor of ophthalmology at Washington University School of Medicine. Cibis became an international authority for the treatment of disease of the vitreous and retina. The surgical techniques he pioneered and developed, involved directly operating on the vitreous to repair retinal detachments. The techniques were innovative and ground breaking. In St. Louis, Cibis teamed with Bernard Becker, Michel Ter-Pogossian, M.A. Constant and M.R. Smith to continue work on the ocular effects from x-radiation.

Cibis was an internationally recognized expert in retinal detachment surgery. He pioneered this procedure. The most significant contribution to ophthalmologic surgery being: "the demonstration of the technique of injecting liquid silicon into the vitreous chamber to replace lost or shrunken vitreous thus forcing the retina back into apposition with the choroid."

== Professional affiliations ==
Cibis was an active member of several professional societies. These include the German Ophthalmological Society, the Optical Society of America, the Association for Research in Ophthalmology and Otolaryngology, the American Medical Association, the Jules Gonin Club, the German Medical Society of Chicago, the Pan-American Ophthalmological Association, and the Pan-Pacific Surgical Association. Shortly after his death, the American Ophthalmological Society elected Cibis as a member.

== Awards and honors ==
In 1949, Docent Dr. Paul Cibis was granted the Albrecht von Graefe Award by the German Ophthalmological Society of Heidelberg for the years 1940 to 1948 inclusive. He singly authored numerous papers, was coauthor on numerous other publications, and produced one textbook titled, Vitreoretinal pathology and surgery in retinal detachment.

The reference work on ophthalmology by Dr. Anand Shroff, An Eye on Numbers: A Ready Reckoner in Ophthalmology, lists in the contributions section on vitreoretinal surgery, in 1962 Cibis is credited with utilizing silicon oil used for the repair of retinal detachments. In 1965, he was recognized as being the first to describe intraocular cryotherapy, in addition to being the first to cut vitreous adhesions and traction bands.

In 2002, the Paul A. Cibis Distinguished Professorship of Ophthalmology and Visual Sciences was established by an anonymous donor at the Washington University School of Medicine in St. Louis.

== Book ==
- Cibis, P. A. (1965). Vitreoretinal pathology and surgery in retinal detachment. St. Louis: CV Mosby.

== Select publications ==
- Cibis, Paul A., Noell, Werner K. and Eichel, Bertram. (1955). Ocular effects produced by high-intensity x-radiation. AMA Archives of Ophthalmology. 53(5): 651–663.
- Cibis, P. A., & Brown, David V.L. (1955). Retinal changes following ionizing radiation. American Journal of Ophthalmology. 40(5): 84–88.
- Brown, D. V., Cibis, P. A., & Pickering, J. E. (1955). Radiation Studies on the Monkey Eye: Effects of Gamma Radiation on the Retina. AMA Archives of Ophthalmology. 54(2): 249–256.
- Byrnes, V. A., Brown, D. V., Rose, H. W., & Cibis, P. A. (1955). Retinal burns—New hazard of the atomic bomb. Journal of the American Medical Association. 157(1): 21–22.
- Byrnes, Victor A., Brown, D. V. L., Rose, H. W., & Cibis, P. A. (1955). OCULAR EFFECTS OF THERMAL RADIATION FROM ATOMIC DETONATION-FLASHBLINDNESS AND CHORIORETINAL BURNS (No. WT-745). SCHOOL OF AVIATION MEDICINE RANDOLPH AFB TX.
- Cibis, P. A., & Noell, W. K. (1955). Cataract Induced by Iodoacetic Acid: A Preliminary Report. American Journal of Ophthalmology. 40(3): 379–382.
- Byrnes, V. A., Brown, D. V. L., Rose, H., & Cibis, P. A. (1956). Retinal Burns - New Hazard of the Atomic Bomb. Plastic and Reconstructive Surgery. 17(6): 492.
- Rose, H. W., Brown, D. V., Byrnes, V. A., & Cibis, P. A. (1956). Human chorioretinal burns from atomic fireballs. AMA Archives of Ophthalmology. 55(2): 205–210.
- Byrnes, V. A., Brown, D. V. L., Rose, H. W., & Cibis, P. A. (1956). Chorioretinal lesions due to thermal radiation from the atomic bomb. AMA Archives of Ophthalmology. 55(6): 909–914.
- Becker, B., Constant, M. A., Cibis, P. A., Ter-Pogossian, M., & Smith, M. R. (1956). The effect of moderate doses of X-ray irradiation on ocular tissue. American Journal of Ophthalmology. 42(4): 51–58.
- Cibis, P. A., Becker, B., Okun, Edward, & Canaan, Samuel. (1962). The use of liquid silicone in retinal detachment surgery. Archives of Ophthalmology. 68(5): 590–599.

== Publications ==
- Cibis, P. A., & Haber, Heinz. (1951). Anisopia and perception of space. JOSA. 41(10): 676–677.
- Cibis, P. A. (1952). Faulty depth perception caused by cyclotorsion. AMA Archives of Ophthalmology. 47(1): 31–42.
- Gerathewohl, S. J., & Cibis, P. A. (1953). The Space between Distinct Contours. The American Journal of Psychology. 436–448.
- Cibis, P. A. (1956). Microscopy with a new illumination technique. American Journal of Ophthalmology. 42(4): 278–288.
- Cibis, P. A., Brown, Elmer B., & Hong, Syng-Min. (1957). Ocular effects of systemic siderosis. American Journal of Ophthalmology. 44(4): 158–172.
- Cibis, Paul A., Constant, Marguerite, Pribyl, August, & Becker, Bernard. (1957). Ocular lesions produced by iodoacetate. AMA Archives of Ophthalmology. 57(4): 508–519.
- Hong, S. M., Cibis, P. A., & Constant, M. (1957). Effects of iodoacetic acid on ocular inflammatory responses. AMA Archives of Ophthalmology. 58(5): 632–640.
- Cibis, P., & Yamashita, T. (January 1958). STAINING OF RETINAL FLAT PREPARATIONS WITH SACCHARATED IRON OXIDE. American Journal of Ophthalmology. 45(6): 929.
- Cibis, P. A., & Moor, William A. (1959). Staining of Fungi With Saccharated Iron Oxide. Biotechnic & Histochemistry. 34(3): 129–133.
- Yamashita, Tsuyoshi, & Cibis, P. A. (1959). Staining of the retina with saccharated iron oxide. AMA Archives of Ophthalmology. 61(5): 698–708.
- Cibis, P. A., & Yamashita, T. (1959). Experimental aspects of ocular siderosis and hemosiderosis. American Journal of Ophthalmology. 48(5): 465–480.
- Cibis, P. A., Yamashita, T., & Rodriguez, Francisco. (1959). Clinical aspects of ocular siderosis and hemosiderosis. AMA Archives of Ophthalmology. 62(2): 180.
- Cibis, P. A. (1961). Discussion Remarks at the Symposium on Treatment of Retinal Detachments. Lausanne, Switzerland. Oct, 4.
- Cibis, P. A. (1962). Limits and hazards of photocoagulation. Transactions-American Academy of Ophthalmology and Otolaryngology. American Academy of Ophthalmology and Otolaryngology. 66: 71.
- Cibis, P. A. (1963). SYMPOSIUM: PRESENT STATUS OF RETINAL DETACHMENT SURGERY. VITREOUS TRANSFER AND SILICONE INJECTIONS. Transactions-American Academy of Ophthalmology and Otolaryngology. American Academy of Ophthalmology and Otolaryngology. 68: 983–987.
- Cibis, P. (January 1964). PATHOGENESIS OF IDIOPATHIC RETINAL DETACHMENT. American Journal of Ophthalmology. 58(5): 867.
- Cibis, P. (January 1964). MANAGEMENT OF COMPLICATED RETINAL DETACHMENTS. American Journal of Ophthalmology. 58(5): 868.
- Cibis, P. A. (1964). Recent methods in the surgical treatment of retinal detachment: intravitreal procedures. Transactions of the ophthalmological societies of the United Kingdom. 85: 111–127.
- Okun, E., & Cibis, P. A. (1964). The role of photocoagulation in the management of retinoschisis. Archives of Ophthalmology. 72(3): 309–314.
- Knobloch, William H., & Cibis, P. A. (1965). Retinal detachment surgery with preserved human sclera. American Journal of Ophthalmology. 60(2): 191–204.
- Cibis, P. A. (1965). Retinoshchisis—retinal cysts. Transactions of the American Ophthalmological Society. 63: 417.
- Cibis, P. A. (1965). Oscillation slitlamp photography. American Journal of Ophthalmology. 60(6): 1062–1067.
- Cibis, P. A. (1965). Treatment of retinal detachment by injection of silicon oil into the vitreous body. Bericht über die Zusammenkunft. Deutsche Ophthalmologische Gesellschaft. 66: 433.
- Cibis, P. A. (1965). Hereditary hyaloideoretinopathies with retinoschisis. Vitreoretinal Pathology and Surgery in Retinal Detachment. St. Louis, CV Mosby. 965: 87–95.
- Cibis, P. A. (1965). Surgical Techniques. Vitreoretinal pathology and surgery in retinal detachment. St. Louis: CV Mosby. 211–215.
- Cibis, P. A. (1965). A Cryogenic Probe for Intravitreal Surgery: A Preliminary Report. American Journal of Ophthalmology. 60(5): 916–918.
- Cibis, P. A. (1965). Rotatable Reflecting Plate: For binocular indirect ophthalmoscope. American Journal of Ophthalmology. 59(1): 99–101.
- Okun, E., & Cibis, P. A. (1965). The Role of Photocoagulation in the Therapy of Proliferative Diabetic Retinopathy (PDR). Transactions of the Section on Ophthalmology of the American Medical Association. Annual Session. 116.
- Cibis, P. A. (1965). Introduction into the Ophthalmology.
- Okun, E., & Cibis, P. A. (1966). The role of photocoagulation in the therapy of proliferative diabetic retinopathy. Archives of Ophthalmology. 75(3): 337–352.
- Cibis, P. A. (1966). RECENT DEVELOPMENTS IN TREATMENT OF RETINOSCHISIS AND IDIOPATHIC RETINAL DETACHMENT. 581.
- Cibis, P. A. (1966). Vitreous cavity and retinal detachment. Bibliotheca ophthalmologica: supplementa ad ophthalmologica. 72: 59–92.
- Cibis, P. A. (1966). Discussion to Lincoff's paper on cryogenic therapy. Bibliotheca ophthalmologica: supplementa ad ophthalmologica. 72: 376–380.
- Cibis, P. A., & Knobloch, W. H. (1967). Scleral implants with preserved human slcera. Bibliotheca ophthalmologica: supplementa ad ophthalmologica. 72: 293.
- Okun, E., & Cibis, P. A. (1968). Photocoagulation in "limited" retinal detachment and breaks without detachment. New and controversial aspects of retinal detachment. International symposium proceedings. New York: Harper & Row. (164-71).
- Okun, E., & Cibis, P. A. (1968). Retinoschisis: Classification, diagnosis and management. McPherson A. New and Controversial Aspects of Retinal Detachment. New York. Hoeber. 424–437.
- Johnston, Glen P., Okun, E., & Cibis, P. A. (1968). Retinal detachment in children: surgical experience. Bibliotheca ophthalmologica: supplementa ad ophthalmologica. 79: 209–220.
- Cibis, P. A., & Knobloch, W. H. (1968). Scleral buckling procedures with preserved human sclera. New and Controversial Aspects of Retinal Detachment. Hagerstown, Md. Harper & Row Publishers Inc. 318–338.
- Okun, E., & Cibis, P. A. (1968). Photocoagulation in "limited" retinal detachment and breaks without detachment. McPherson, A. (Ed): New and Controversial Aspects of Retinal Detachment. 164− 172.
