= Adolf Thiel =

German-American engineer (1915–2001)

- Born: February 12, 1915; Vienna, Austria-Hungary
- Died: June 2, 2001 (aged 86); Los Angeles, California, U.S.
- Known for: Supervised preliminary design of the Redstone missile and other short- and intermediate-range ballistic missile systems.
- Spouse: Frances Thiel
- Children: 2 sons
- Awards: Fellow of the American Astronautical Society
- Scientific career
- Fields: Guided missiles
- Workplaces: United States Army

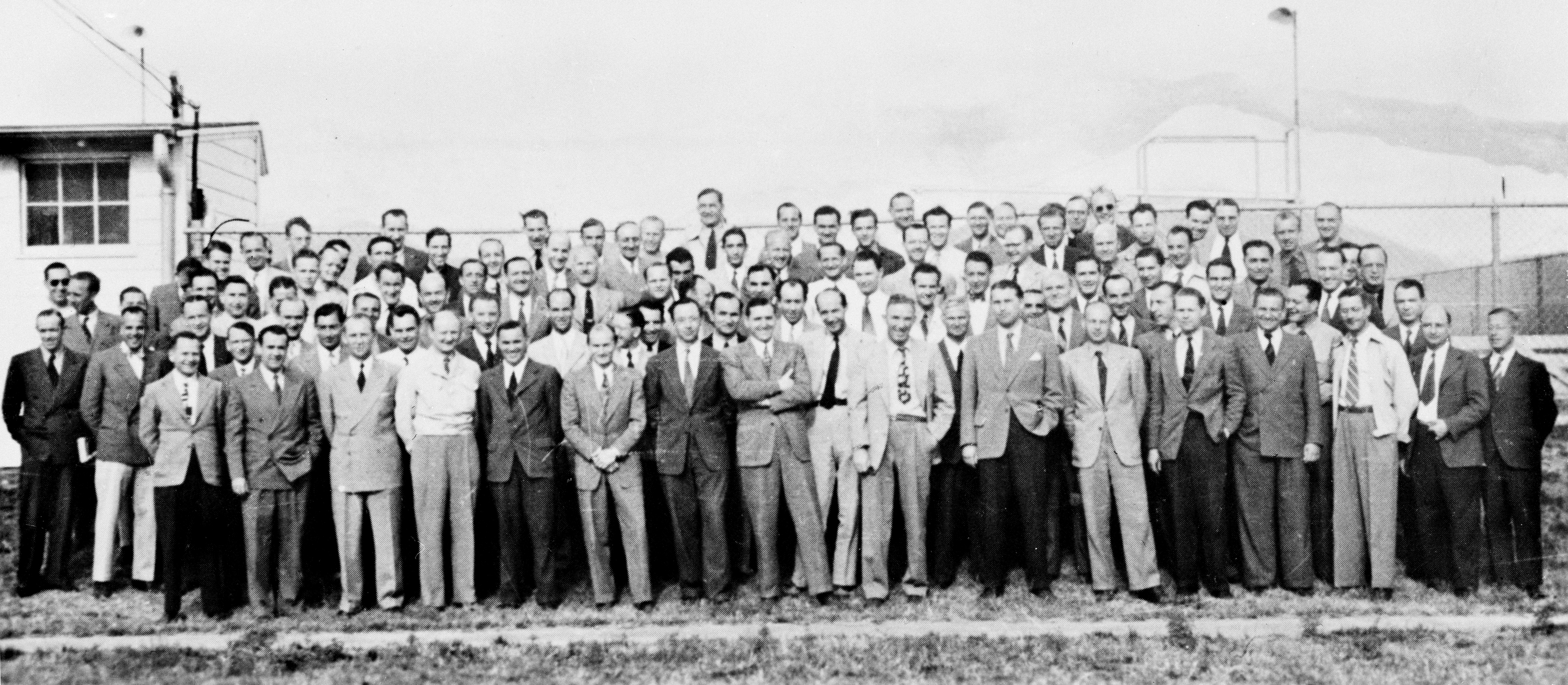
Operation Paperclip Team at Fort Bliss, Texas, August 1946. Adolf Thiel is in the last row. (pointing the mouse will show the name)

Adolf Karl Thiel (also spelled Adolph; February 12, 1915 – June 2, 2001 Los Angeles) was an Austrian-born German expert in guided missiles during World War II, and later worked for the United States Army and TRW.

Thiel had been an associate professor of engineering at the Institute of Technology in Darmstadt before joining Wernher von Braun's team at the Army Research Center Peenemünde, where he was involved in developing the V-2 rocket. By the end of the war, he was transferred to the United States by the US Army (see Operation Paperclip and German rocket scientists in the US) where he resumed his work with von Braun's group in Fort Bliss, Texas. During the nine years Thiel worked for the U.S. Army, he held positions at White Sands Missile Range in New Mexico and at Huntsville, Alabama. He primarily supervised preliminary design of the Redstone missile and other short- and intermediate-range ballistic missile systems.

Thiel left the Army in 1955 to join Space Technology Laboratories, which later became TRW. During the late 1950s, he was program manager for the Thor ballistic missile, which became a first-stage launch for the Explorer spacecraft. He was director of space projects for TRW when it developed Explorer VI and Pioneer V, two of the earliest US craft to explore interplanetary space. He oversaw all of TRW's space programs during the 1970s.

After his retirement in 1980 as a senior vice president, Thiel served as an executive consultant to TRW and on NASA planning groups. He was named a fellow of the American Astronautical Society in 1968.

== Family ==
He married Frances Thiel; they had two sons, Mike and Christopher.
