= Thiel (crater) =

Crater on the Moon

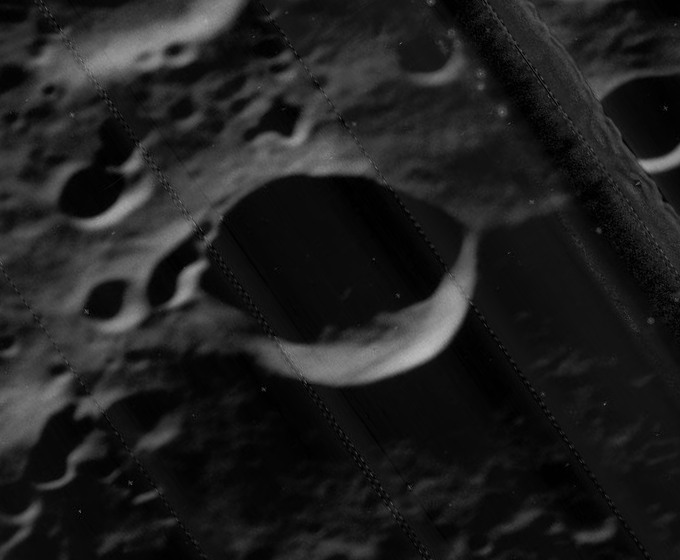
- Oblique Lunar Orbiter 5 image
- Coordinates: 40.4°N 134.5°W
- Diameter: 32 km
- Depth: Unknown
- Colongitude: 134° at sunrise
- Eponym: Walter Thiel

Thiel is a lunar impact crater on the far side of the Moon. It is located to the south of the larger crater Quetelet, and to the north-northwest of Charlier. This is a sharp-edged, roughly circular crater with a small impact along the outer rim to the north-northeast. It is otherwise relatively free from impact erosion, and the interior is unmarked by significant craters. The inner walls are uneven in places, with piles of scree along the base.

== Satellite craters ==
By convention these features are identified on lunar maps by placing the letter on the side of the crater midpoint that is closest to Thiel.

| Thiel | Latitude | Longitude | Diameter |
|---|---|---|---|
| T | 40.4° N | 136.6° W | 31 km |
