= Bernard Becker =

American ophthalmologist (1920–2013

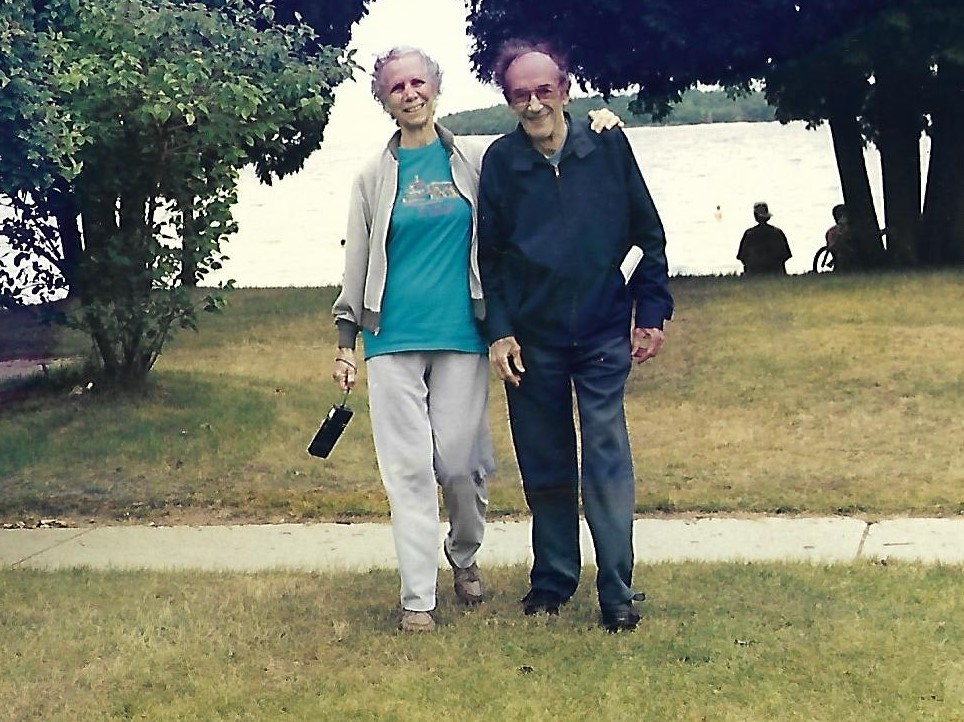
- Born: August 21, 1920; New York City, U.S.
- Died: August 28, 2013 (aged 93); St. Louis, Missouri, U.S.
- Education: Princeton University; Harvard Medical School
- Years active: 1944–2013
- Known for: Pioneer in glaucoma research; namesake of the Bernard Becker Medical Library
- Relatives: Janet Becker (wife)
- Medical career
- Profession: Physician
- Field: Ophthalmology
- Institutions: Washington University School of Medicine; Johns Hopkins University
- Sub-specialties: Glaucoma
- Research: Aqueous humor dynamics; acetazolamide; corticosteroid genetics
- Notable works: Diagnosis and Therapy of the Glaucomas

Bernard Becker (August 21, 1920 – August 28, 2013) was an American professor emeritus of ophthalmology and visual sciences at Washington University School of Medicine in St. Louis. He was born in New York City.

Becker was internationally honored as an expert on the diagnosis and treatment of glaucoma and active in teaching and research. For more than 35 years, he led Washington University's department of ophthalmology.

In 1978, students, patients, and colleagues raised funds in his honor, which now endow two faculty positions: the Bernard and Janet Becker Professorship (presently held by Dr. Shiming Chen) and the Bernard Becker Professorship (presently held by Dr. Timothy McBride).

== Early life and education ==
After graduating from Harvard Medical School in 1944, he joined the United States Army during World War II and served as a military psychiatrist.

== Death ==
A week after his 93rd birthday, Becker died from lung cancer at his home in the Central West End, St. Louis on August 28, 2013.
