= Franz Rybicki =

Austrian footballer and manager

Personal information
- Date of birth: 12 August 1924
- Place of birth: Austria
- Date of death: 25 September 2014 (aged 90)
- Position: Defender

Senior career*
Years	Team	Apps	(Gls)
1942–1946	Rapid Vienna	37	(3)
1947–1951	First Vienna		
- Kapfenberger SV

Managerial career
- 1955–1957: FC Stadlau
- 1957–1958: Ethnikos Piraeus
- 1958–1960: DFC
- 1960–1961: IJ.V.V. Stormvogels
- 1961–1963: BVV
- 1964–1966: AGOVV Apeldoorn
- 1966–1967: Ethnikos Piraeus
- * Club domestic league appearances and goals

Franz Rybicki (12 August 1924 – 25 September 2014) was an association football player and manager from Austria. He played for Rapid Vienna, First Vienna and Kapfenberger SV. He coached FC Stadlau, Ethnikos Piraeus, DFC, IJ.V.V. Stormvogels, BVV, AGOVV
