= William Mrazek =

German-American loads engineer and Operation Paperclip hire

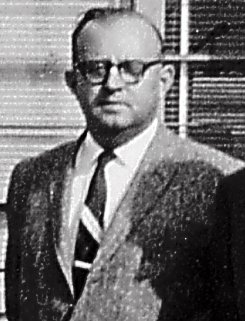
- Born: October 20, 1911; Lukavac, Austria-Hungary
- Died: February 8, 1992 (aged 80); Huntsville, Alabama, U.S.
- Education: Deutsche Technische Hochschule, Brünn (1935)
- Spouse: Berta Mrazek
- Children: 3

William "Willi" Mrazek (October 20, 1911 – February 8, 1992) was a German-American loads engineer and member of the "von Braun rocket group." Mrazek worked first at Peenemünde Army Research Center and later, through Operation Paperclip, at Fort Bliss and the Marshall Space Flight Center, where he was involved with the development of the Saturn V rocket.

== Biography ==
Mrazek was born in 1911 in what was then Austria-Hungary. He graduated from Deutsche Technische Hochschule, where he earned his Dipl. Ing., in 1935. Mrazek spent some military time after graduation on the Eastern Front, where he received a saber wound to his face; following his injury, he began work at Peenemünde, which continued from 1941 to 1945.

In 1946, Mrazek was one of the engineers and scientists invited to the United States through Operation Paperclip, arriving with von Braun's team at Fort Bliss on April 8. The Marshall Space Flight Center employed Mrazek, naming him Director of Structures and Mechanics Division in 1960; by 1969, he held the position of Assistant Director for Engineering for Industrial Operations. Mrazek also reported to the Saturn V Project Manager as Chief Engineer for all development and fabrication work on the rocket from 1965 to 1970. While working on the Saturn V, Mrazek and his team clashed with American aviation companies who were subcontracted on the project. One such instance involved an argument with North American Aviation over internal loads in the rocket's S-II phase; North American was ultimately proven right, to Mrazek's consternation.
