= Gerhard B. Heller =

German-American rocket scientist and Operation Paperclip hire

- Born: Gerhard Bernhard Heller; January 24, 1914; Eschwege, Germany
- Died: October 1, 1972 (aged 58); Nashville, Tennessee, U.S.
- Education: Technische Universität Darmstadt, Darmstadt. BS (1938) and MS (1940)
- Spouse: Herta Heller
- Children: 2

Gerhard B. Heller (January 24, 1914 - October 1, 1972) was a German-American rocket scientist and member of the "von Braun rocket team." He worked at Peenemünde Army Research Center during World War II and later, through Operation Paperclip, moved to develop rockets for the U.S., eventually becoming employed at the Marshall Space Flight Center.

== Biography ==
Heller was born in Eschwege in 1914. He attended university at the Technische Universität Darmstadt, where he majored in physical chemistry, earning his BS in 1938 and his MS in 1940. After graduating, Heller worked in the rocket team at Peenemünde from 1940 until the end of World War II in 1945.

In 1945, Heller was scouted through Operation Paperclip as part of a team to restore a V-2 rocket. He and his family traveled to the U.S. aboard an army ship, likely the Argentina, and arrived in New York. From there they took a train to Texas, where Heller was initially stationed at Fort Bliss. In 1950, he and his family traveled to Huntsville, Alabama to continue his work.

After arriving in Huntsville, Heller began work with the Army Ballistic Missile Agency. Beginning in 1951, he taught at the Redstone Arsenal Institute of Graduate Studies as a lecturer in thermodynamics. After the founding of the Marshall Space Flight Center in 1960, Heller made the move to the new organization, becoming deputy director of the Research Projects Division. By 1969 he had become Chief of the Space Thermodynamics Division of the MSFC's Space Sciences Laboratory.

Heller died in 1972 after an automobile accident. After his death, his widow, Ms. Hertha Heller, created the Gerhard B. Heller Memorial Scholarship at the University of Alabama in Huntsville, where she was faculty.
