= Bernhard Tessmann =

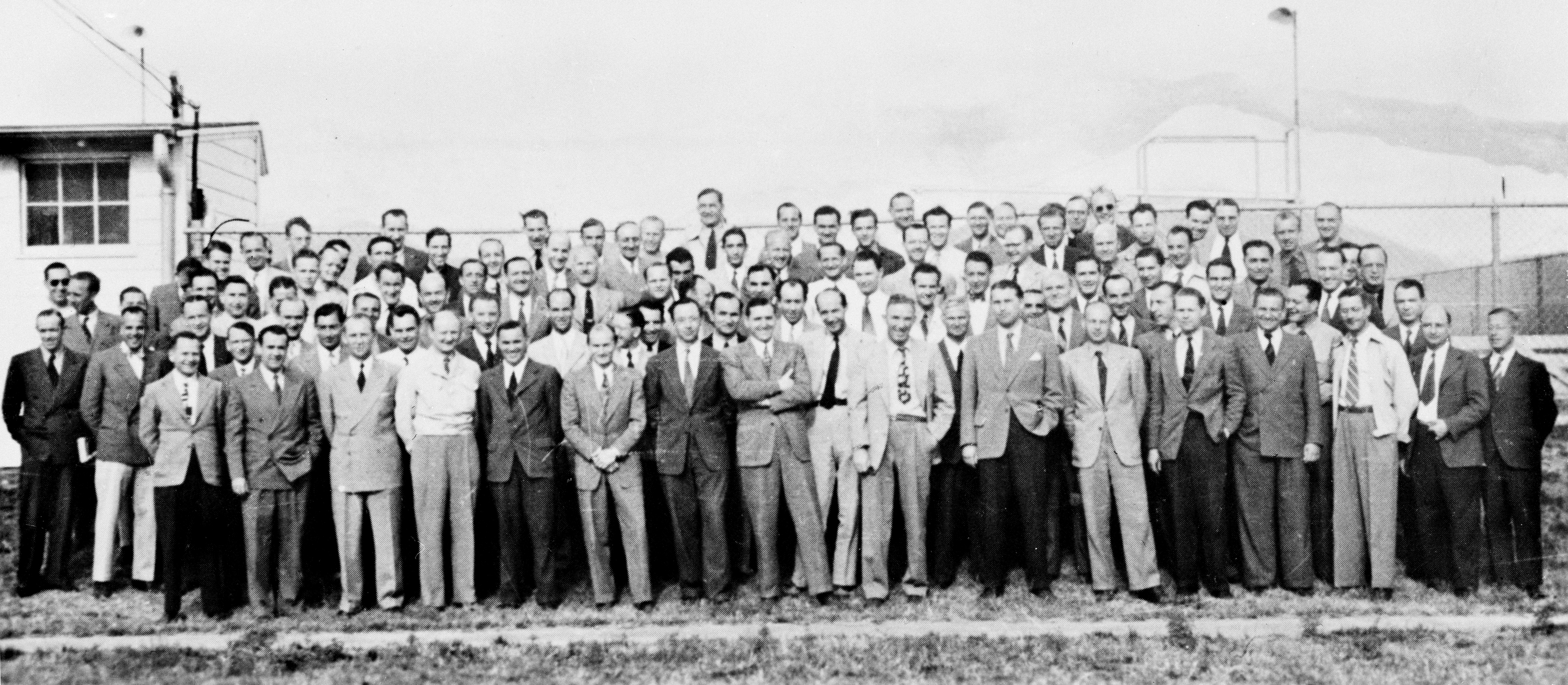
Operation Paperclip Team at Fort Bliss, Texas, August 1946. (pointing the mouse will show the name)

Bernhard Robert Tessmann (August 15, 1912 in Zingst – December 19, 1998) was a German-American expert in guided missiles during World War II, and later worked for the United States Army and NASA.

== Life ==
Tessmann first met rocket expert Wernher von Braun in 1935. He had little interest in spaceflight, even though he had seen the sets of the film Frau im Mond since his father worked at Universum Film AG studios. Tessmann was involved in the basic planning for Army Research Center Peenemünde, moving there in late 1936 to supervise construction and conduct first engine testing there at Test Stand I. Tessmann worked on wind tunnels, then on thrust measuring systems for V-2 engines.

He was evacuated after the bombing in August 1943 to Koelpinsee where he designed ground equipment for V-2 mobile units and was involved in the planning for the "Projekt Zement" underground V-2 facilities at Ebensee, Austria, and test facilities near Lehesten.

Tessmann was a key man in securing the V-2 legacy at the end of the war. Once von Braun became afraid the SS would follow the Führer's "scorched earth" policy and destroy the tons of precious V-2 documents and blueprints, he instructed his personal aide, Dieter Huzel, and Bernhard Tessmann, chief designer of the Peenemünde test facilities, to hide the documents in a safe place.

It took three Opel trucks to carry the 14 tons of papers. The little convoy headed north on April 3, 1945 toward the nearby Harz Mountains. By the end of the day Tessmann and Huzel found an abandoned iron mine in the isolated village of Dornten, which was managed by a loyal Nazi Herr Nebelung. Thirty-six hours later, all of the documents had been hauled by a small locomotive into the heart of the mine and hand-carried into the powder magazine.

Eventually, von Braun and his leading V-2 engineers and scientists voluntarily surrendered to the U.S. 44th Division. Almost as important was the recovery of the 14 tons of V-2 documents hidden by Tessman and Huzel in the Dornten iron mine.

Tessmann was transferred to the United States at the end of the war via the Operation Paperclip, and as of January 1947, was working at Fort Bliss, Texas. Thereafter he worked his entire life with the rocket team, at Fort Bliss, White Sands Missile Range, and then at Huntsville. As of 1960, he was a Deputy Director of Test Division at NASA Marshall Space Flight Center.

He died in Huntsville, Alabama. The Ilse and Bernhard Tessmann Music, and Foreign Language Scholarship, are awarded at the University of Alabama, Huntsville.
