= Helmut Horn =

German-American rocket scientist and applied physicist

- Born: Helmut Justus Karl Horn; June 24, 1912; Frankfurt, Germany
- Died: January 20, 1994 (aged 81); Huntsville, Alabama, U.S.
- Education: Technische Universität Darmstadt, Darmstadt (1939)
- Spouse: Leni Betzler
- Children: 3

Helmut Justus Karl Horn (June 24, 1912 - January 20, 1994) was a German-American engineer and applied physicist who was employed at the early Marshall Space Flight Center. Horn worked first at the Peenemünde Army Research Center and later, after the end of World War II, was hired by the U.S. through Operation Paperclip.

== Biography ==
Horn was born on June 24, 1912, in Frankfurt. He attended college at the Technische Universität Darmstadt, graduating in 1939 with an M.S. in engineering, specifically applied physics. After graduation, he went to work with the German rocket team at Peenemünde under Wernher von Braun. He continued there from 1939 until the war's end in 1945.

As a member of von Braun's rocket team, Horn was one of the engineers scouted by Operation Paperclip. He traveled to the U.S. aboard the Argentina, arriving on November 16, 1945. After arriving Horn worked within the U.S. rocket program, first at Fort Bliss and then at White Sands. His wife Leni followed him, immigrating to the U.S. to join him in 1951. By 1952, Horn had moved to Redstone Arsenal, where he taught at the Redstone Arsenal Institute of Graduate Studies as a lecturer in Applied Mathematics.

By 1960, Horn had joined the rocket team at the newly created Marshall Space Flight Center, where he first served as head of the Dynamics Analysis Branch of the center's Aeroballistics Division. In 1960 or 1961, Horn was involved with development on the Saturn program. He adapted the bilinear tangent steering law developed by mathematician Derek Frank Lawden, creating an algorithm that would improve upon existing software to calculate optimal in-flight trajectories. Horn's algorithm eventually led to the Iterative Guidance Mode used by the guidance systems of numerous Saturn projects including the Saturn V rocket. In 1962, Horn took part in investigating the viability of lunar orbit rendezvous for Project Apollo. By February 1969, he was the assistant director of MSFC's Aero-Astrodynamics Laboratory; he was later promoted to deputy director.
