= Konrad Dannenberg =

German-American rocket pioneer (1912–2009)

- Born: August 5, 1912; Weißenfels, Province of Saxony, German Empire
- Died: February 16, 2009 (aged 96); Huntsville, Alabama, United States
- Resting place: Maple Hill Cemetery
- Education: University of Hannover
- Occupations: Rocket engineer and designer
- Spouses: Ingeborg M. Kamke; Jacquelyn E. Staiger
- Children: 1

Konrad Dannenberg (August 5, 1912 – February 16, 2009) was a German-American rocket pioneer and member of the German rocket team brought to the United States after World War II.

== Early years ==
Dannenberg was born in Weißenfels, Province of Saxony (current Saxony-Anhalt). At the age of two, he and his family moved to Hannover, where he spent his youth. He became interested in space technology while attending a lecture by Max Valier, a German pioneer in that field. He witnessed two tests with a rocket-driven railroad car in Burgwedel near Hannover and then joined Albert Püllenberg's group of amateur rocketeers. Dannenberg studied mechanical engineering at the Technische Hochschule Hannover (current University of Hannover) with emphasis in diesel fuel injection, because he recognized that injectors would also be part of the process of moving propellants into a high-pressure rocket engine.

Dannenberg was a member of the Nazi Party since 1932. When World War II began, he was drafted into the German Army in 1939, serving first with a horse-artillery unit acquired by the German Army in Czechoslovakia. He took part in the initial stages of the Battle of France.

== Career ==
In the spring of 1940, through the influence of Püllenberg, Dannenberg was discharged from the army and became a civilian employee at the Heeresversuchsanstalt Peenemünde (Peenemünde Army Research Center). Under Walter Thiel's guidance, he became a rocket propulsion specialist. His main assignment was developing a rocket engine for the V-2 ballistic missile. He was at Peenemünde on October 3, 1942 to witness the launch of the first man-made object to reach outer space, a V-2 rocket. This was the first man-made vehicle to reach space based on a then-current definition of 50 miles in altitude (see Kármán line for relevant background). Many improvements on which he worked could not be completed in time for production. After Thiel's death in an August 1943 bombing raid, a design freeze stopped all development efforts. Dannenberg then became Walter Riedel's deputy and headed the crash effort to finalize production drawings of the V-2, the world's first ballistic missile, used by the Nazis to bomb London. He was interviewed for the documentary The Hunt for Hitler's Scientists.

After the end of World War II, Dannenberg was brought to the United States with 117 other German specialists under Operation Paperclip to Fort Bliss, Texas. Most members of the group performed calculations and designs of future advanced launch vehicles with longer ranges and greater payloads. About 30 members trained the U.S. Army and the support contractor General Electric to launch V-2s at the White Sands Proving Ground. Due to range limitations, all rockets were launched vertically, to limit their range. Robert H. Goddard's idea of upper atmosphere research could now be conducted on a large scale. When the Korean War started, the group was required to leave their quarters in an Annex to the Wm. Beaumont Hospital, and were eventually transferred to the Redstone Arsenal near Huntsville, Alabama, where development of the PGM-11 Redstone Missile was their first assignment. At that time, rocket pioneer and former SS major Wernher von Braun decided not to start their own rocket engine development, but to purchase an engine from North American Aviation (NAA) that was being developed by Dannenberg's former boss, Riedel, who had previously left the team to join NAA. Due to these circumstances, Dannenberg became Liaison Engineer at NAA's Rocketdyne Division and procured rocket engines for the Redstone and the Jupiter IRBM for the U.S. Army. He also became responsible for production of the Redstone and Jupiter missile systems for the Army Ballistic Missile Agency at the Chrysler plant in Detroit, Michigan.

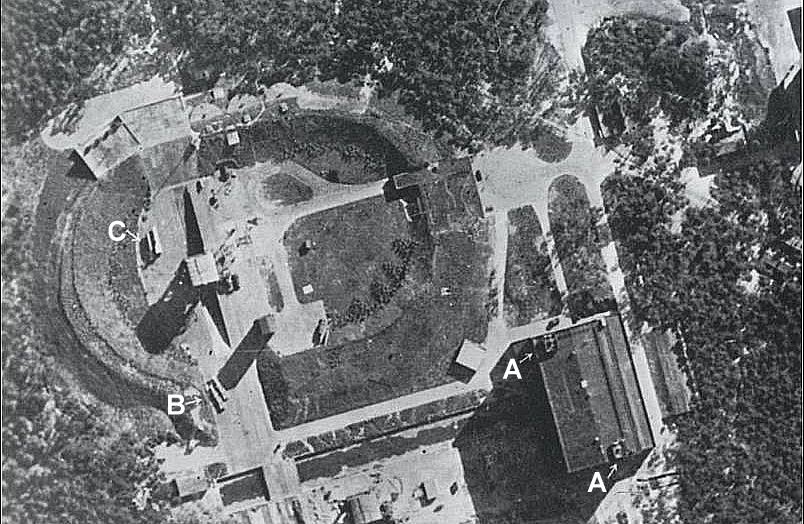
An aerial view of Test Stand VII at Heeresversuchsanstalt Peenemünde (Peenemünde Army Research Center), where Konrad Dannenberg assisted in designing and testing the first successful V2 rockets

In 1960, Dannenberg joined NASA's newly established Marshall Space Flight Center as Deputy Manager of the Saturn program. He received the NASA Exceptional Service Medal in 1973 for successfully initiating development of the largest rocket ever built, the Saturn V, which took the first human beings to the moon.

When Arthur Rudolph came back from the Army's development of the Pershing missile system, von Braun assigned the management of the Saturn system to him. Dannenberg then started to work on Saturn-based space stations, which were eventually replaced by the Space Shuttle-based ISS.

== Post-retirement ==
Dannenberg retired from the Marshall Space Flight Center in 1973 and became an associate professor of aerospace engineering at the University of Tennessee Space Institute (UTSI) in Tullahoma, Tennessee.

Dannenberg was a Fellow of the American Institute of Aeronautics and Astronautics and past president of the Alabama/Mississippi Chapter of this organization. In 1990, he received the prestigious DURAND Lectureship, and in 1996, the Hermann Oberth Award.

He lectured on basic rocketry at the United States Space Camp.

He was a member of the NASA/MSFC Retirees Association, an honorary member of the Hermann Oberth Society of Germany and a charter member of the L5 Society, which is now the National Space Society (NSS). In 1992, the Alabama Space and Rocket Center established "The Konrad Dannenberg Scholarship" in his honor, which grants the winning youngster free admittance to a Space Academy session. He attended many meetings of the International Astronautical Federation and presented a number of historical papers in their sessions.

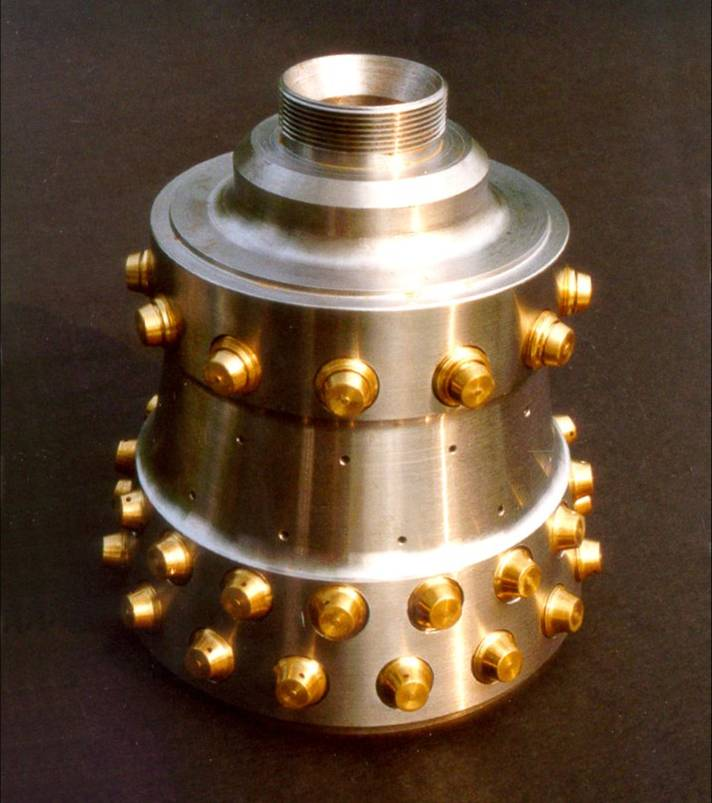
One of 18 units that was part of a rocket engine combustion chamber that Dannenberg helped design

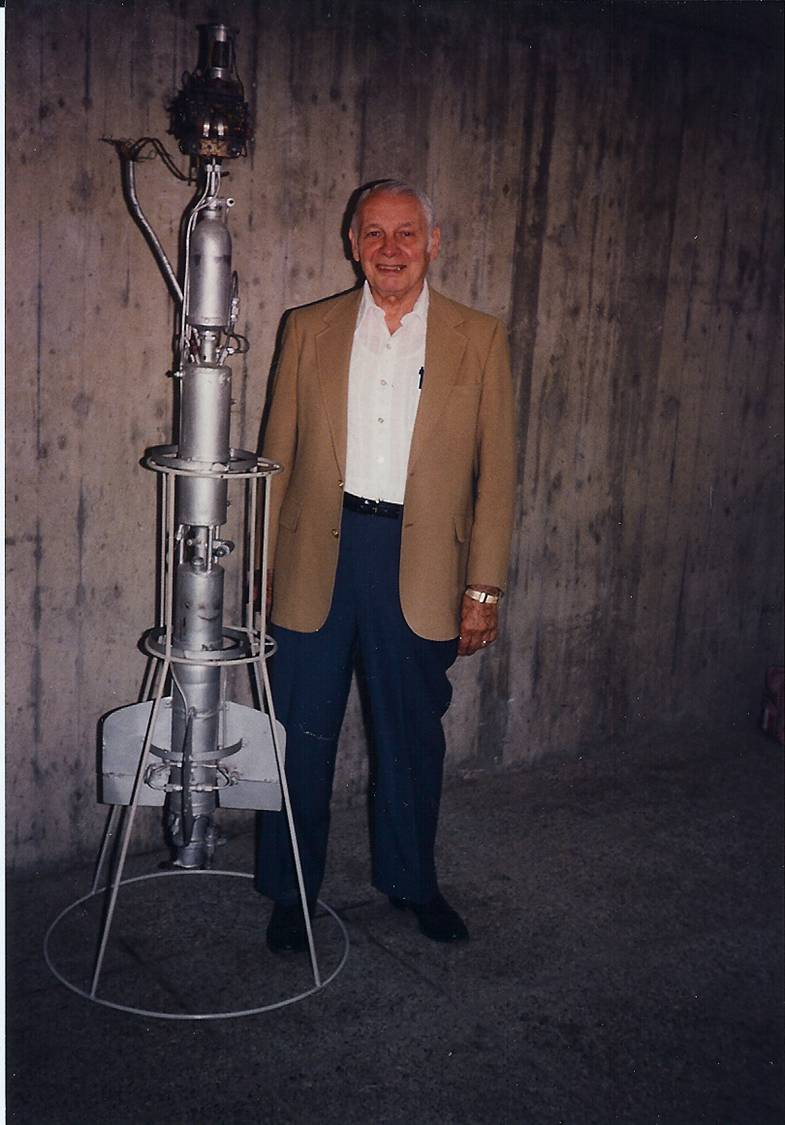
In the Historisches Museum Hannover, Dannenberg stands next to a Püllenberg R-7 rocket that he helped design.

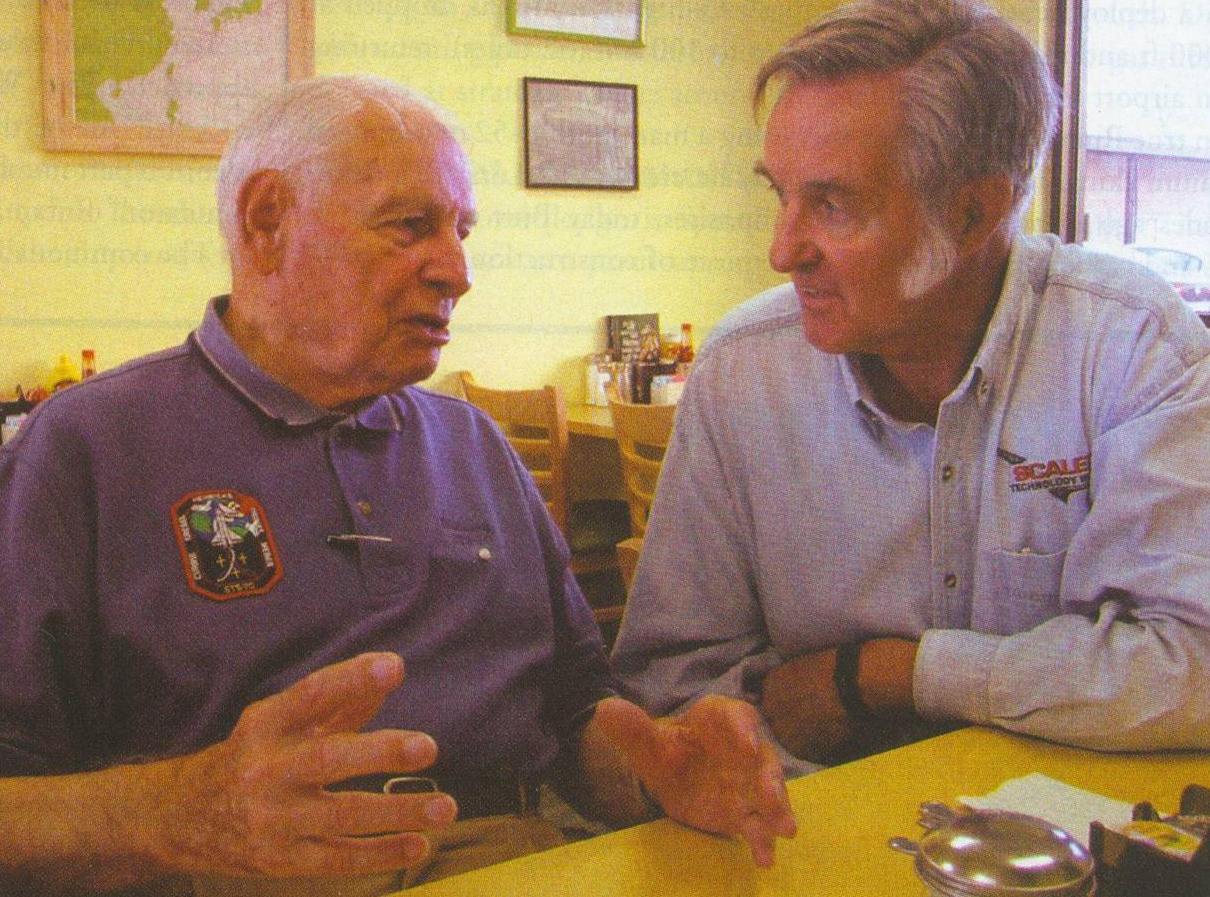
Dannenberg talks with Scaled Composite's founder, Burt Rutan.

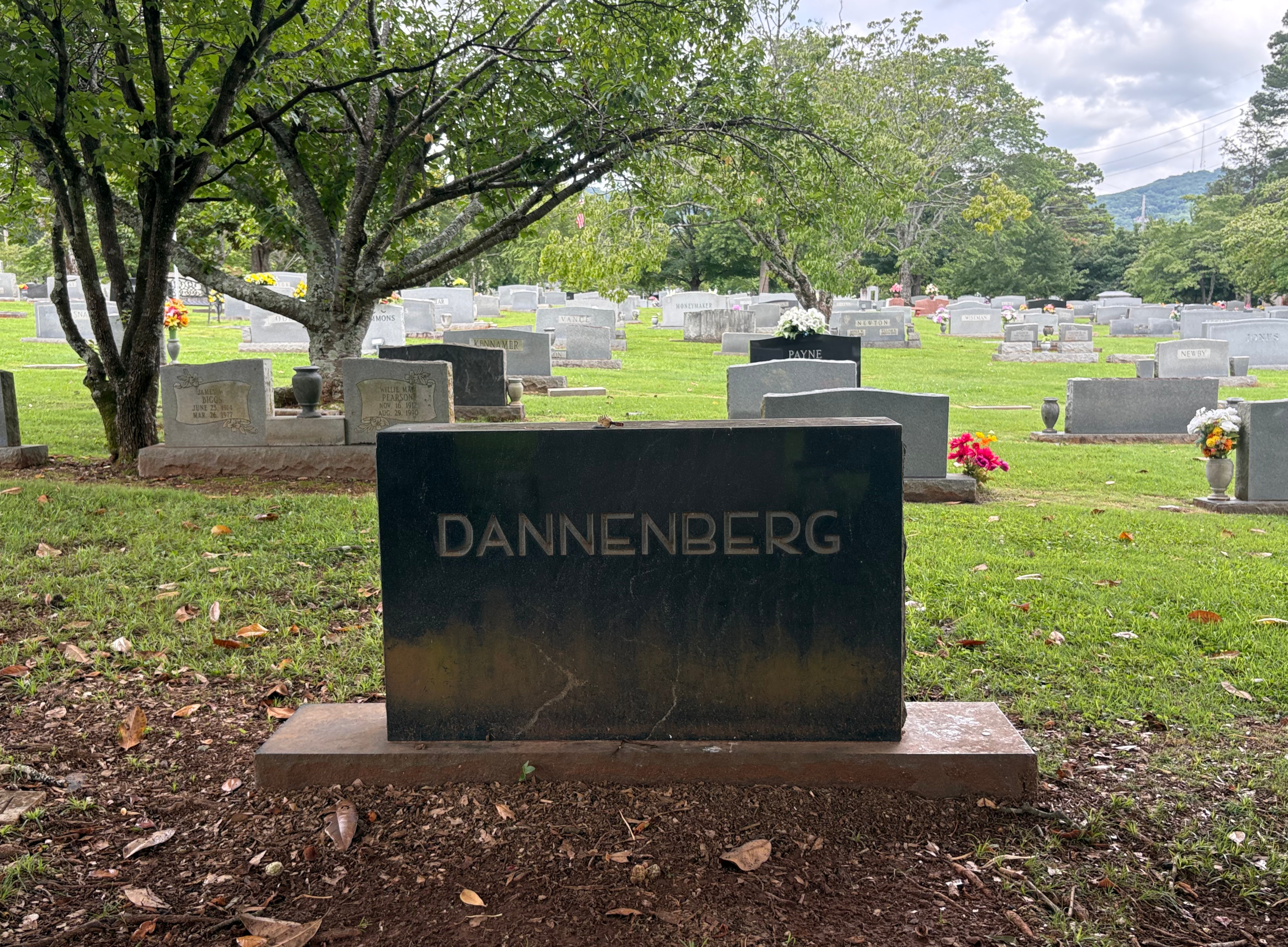
Dannenberg's grave at Maple Hill Cemetery

== Personal life ==
He was married to Ingeborg M. Kamke, and had a son, Klaus Dieter, who has two married children. From them Dannenberg had four great grandchildren. He had remarried to Jacquelyn E. Staiger of Kingston, Massachusetts. Dannenberg died in Huntsville on the morning of Monday, February 16, 2009, at the age of 96. He is buried at Maple Hill Cemetery (Huntsville, Alabama).
