= Walter Jacobi =

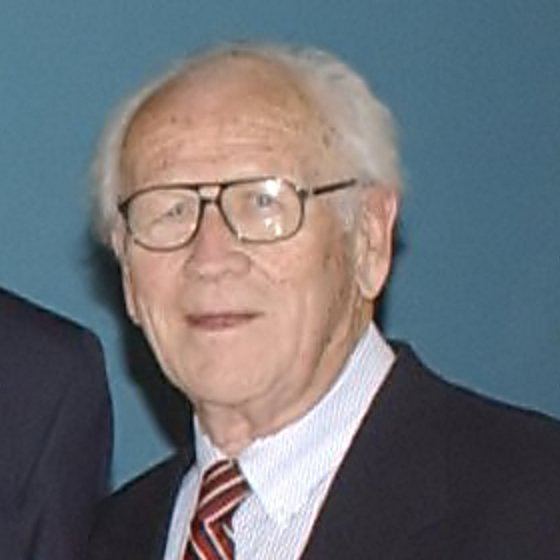
- Jacobi in 2002
- Born: January 13, 1918; Saalfeld, Germany
- Died: August 19, 2009 (aged 91); Huntsville, Alabama, United States
- Scientific career
- Fields: Aeronautics
- Workplaces: Peenemünde; Fort Bliss; Redstone Arsenal; Marshall Space Flight Center

Walter Jacobi (January 13, 1918 – August 19, 2009) was a rocket scientist and member of the "von Braun rocket group", at Peenemünde (1939–1945) working on the V-2 rockets in World War II.

He was among the scientists to surrender and travel to the United States to provide rocketry expertise via Operation Paperclip. He came to the United States on the first boat, November 16, 1945 with Operation Paperclip and Fort Bliss, Texas (1945–49). He continued his work with the team when they moved to Redstone Arsenal, and he joined Marshall Space Flight Center to work for NASA. He worked on rocket "structure and components." He continued to support the space program and appear at public events until his death.
