= Hans Fichtner =

German-American rocket scientist

- Born: September 8, 1917; Leipzig, German Empire
- Died: October 21, 2012 (aged 95) 7:15 A.M; Huntsville hospital
- Scientific career
- Fields: Aeronautics
- Workplaces: Peenemünde; Fort Bliss; Redstone Arsenal; Marshall Space Flight Center

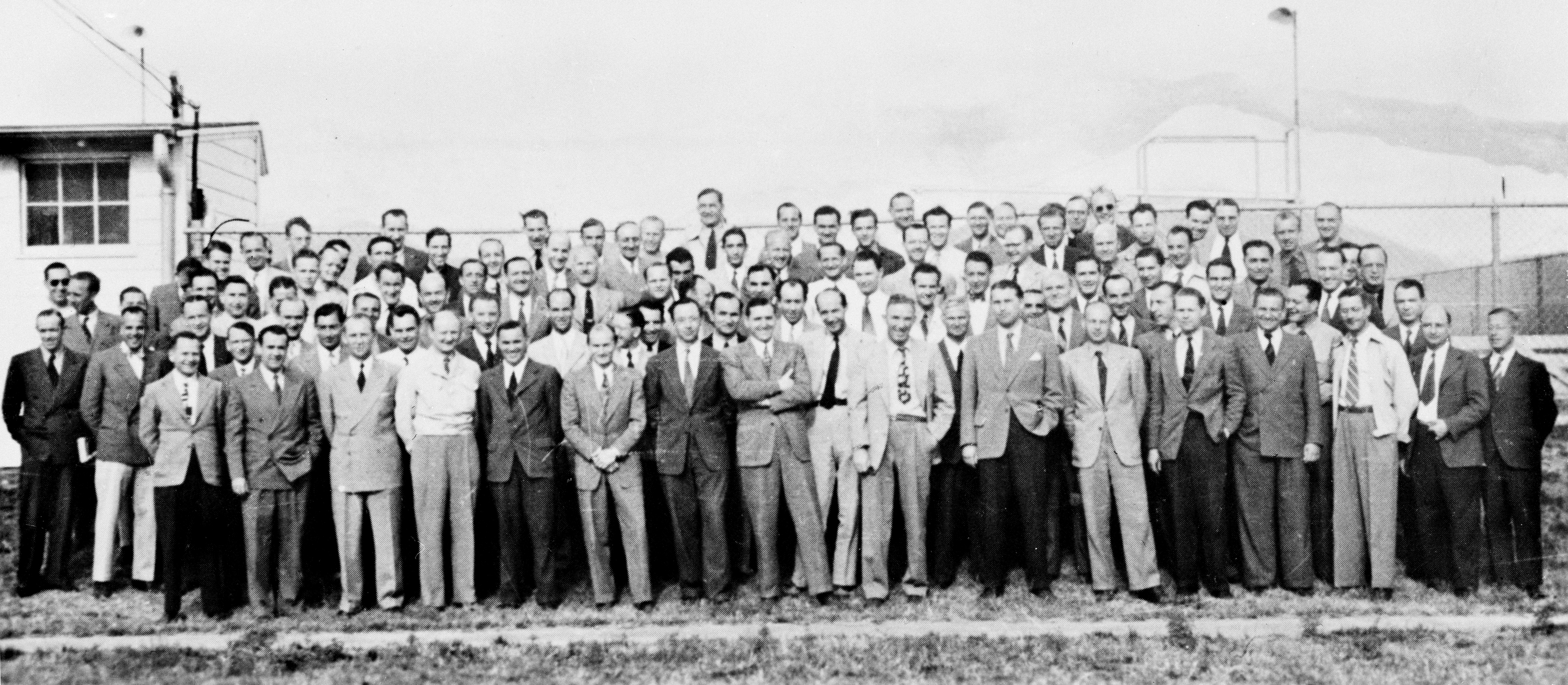
Operation Paperclip Team at Fort Bliss, Texas, August 1946. (pointing the mouse will show the name)

Hans Joachim Oskar Fichtner (September 8, 1917 – October 21, 2012) was a German-American rocket scientist who worked on V-2 rockets for Wernher von Braun at Peenemünde from 1939 to 1945. He was among the scientists to surrender and travel to the United States to provide rocketry expertise via Operation Paperclip which took them first to Fort Bliss, Texas (1945–1949). He continued his work with the team when they moved to Redstone Arsenal, and he joined Marshall Space Flight Center to work for NASA.

In a personal letter to a space aficionado, Fichtner wrote, "I worked at Peenemünde to design the control system of the A4. Later I laid out the electrical system for the V-2 ground and airborne. Arrived at the States with the 55 specialists Nov 17, 45, designed the electrical system for all White Sands V-2 launches in the first 1 1/2 years. Did all the electrical systems design for Redstone, Mercury-Redstone, Jupiter, Pershing missile. Was totally responsible for the entire ground and airborne electrical systems for the Apollo 100, 200 series, all Saturn V firings and Skylab after Apollo project. Was Chief engineer for the satellite series high energy astronomy observatory (HEAO). Worked as a consultant for the layout of the Spacelab. Electrical system with ESA in the Netherlands 1975/76. Introduced the automated, computerized checkout and firing sequence during the Saturn/Apollo program".
