= Walter Haeussermann =

German-American aerospace engineer (1914–2010)

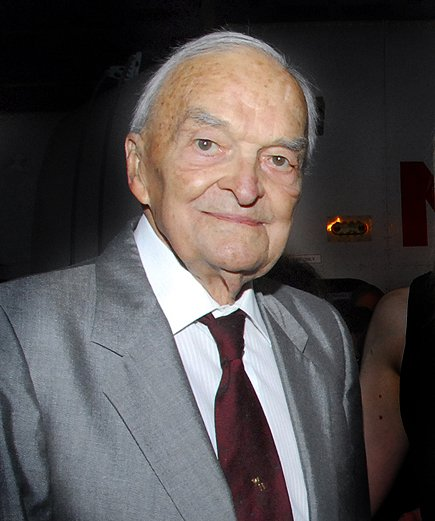
- Haeussermann in 2008
- Born: March 2, 1914; Künzelsau, Kingdom of Württemberg, German Empire
- Died: December 8, 2010 (aged 96); Huntsville, Alabama, U.S.
- Education: Darmstadt University of Technology
- Awards: Department of the Army Decoration for Exceptional Civilian Service, 1959; NASA Outstanding Leadership Medal, 1963; NASA Exceptional Service Medal, 1969; Institute of Navigation Superior Achievement Award, 1969
- Scientific career
- Fields: Mathematics, Engineering
- Workplaces: Peenemünde; Redstone Arsenal; Marshall Space Flight Center

Walter Haeussermann (also spelled Häussermann; March 2, 1914 – December 8, 2010) was a German-American aerospace engineer and member of the "von Braun rocket group", both at Peenemünde and later at Marshall Space Flight Center, where he was the director of the guidance and control laboratory. He was awarded the Department of the Army Decoration for Exceptional Civilian Service in 1959 for his contributions to the US rocket program.

== Biography ==
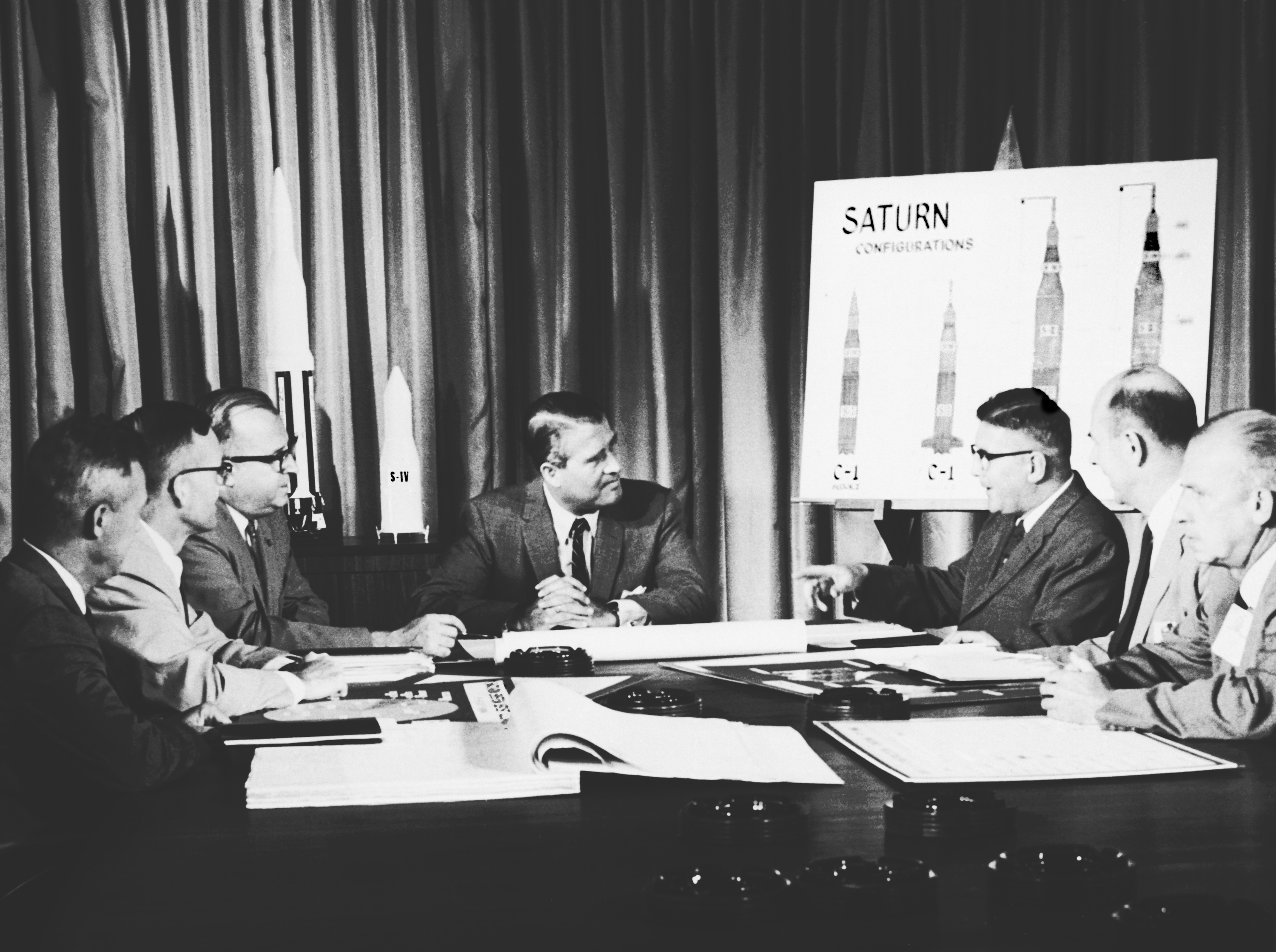
Von Braun's rocket team in 1961. Haeussermann is second from the left.

Haeussermann was born in Germany shortly before the beginning of World War I. He eventually matriculated at the Darmstadt University of Technology, where he earned a doctorate in physics. He was drafted into the German army for World War II and taken to the rocket development center at Peenemünde on December 1, 1939. In a 2008 interview, he recalled seeing a rocket engine test upon his arrival there, saying, "I was flabbergasted, because on the first day I was shown a rocket test ... I was astonished that something like this was already existing." Asked about meeting von Braun, he enthusiastically replied, "I met him the second day. I was very interested about him." He worked on the V-2 guidance and simulations by means of analog computers.

He stayed at Peenemünde 3 years, then returned to Darmstadt where he worked for Kreiselgeraete and Siemens to develop a gyroscopic guidance platform. After the war, he was invited to join von Braun's team in Fort Bliss, Texas, but initially declined because his wife was ill. Helmut Hölzer and Ernst Steinhoff accepted the Operation Paperclip invitation to the United States, traveled there in late 1945, and maintained contact with Haeussermann. Haeussermann came to the United States in 1947 to rejoin von Braun's team, working on ballistic missile guidance and control engineering at Fort Bliss. In 1951, the group moved to Redstone Arsenal.

In 1954, Haeussermann became a naturalized US citizen. At that time he was the director of the Guidance and Control Laboratory and head of the Astrionics Division of what is now Marshall Space Flight Center.

NASA was formed in 1958, and Haeussermann was on the initial roster. There, he led electrical, computer systems, guidance, and navigation systems for the Saturn V. He took his responsibility for the astronauts safe transport seriously. He said, "I refused any congratulation before Apollo 11 astronauts were safely back. Of course, we were very proud."

His contributions to the space program were recognized with the Department of the Army Decoration for Exceptional Civilian Service in 1959.

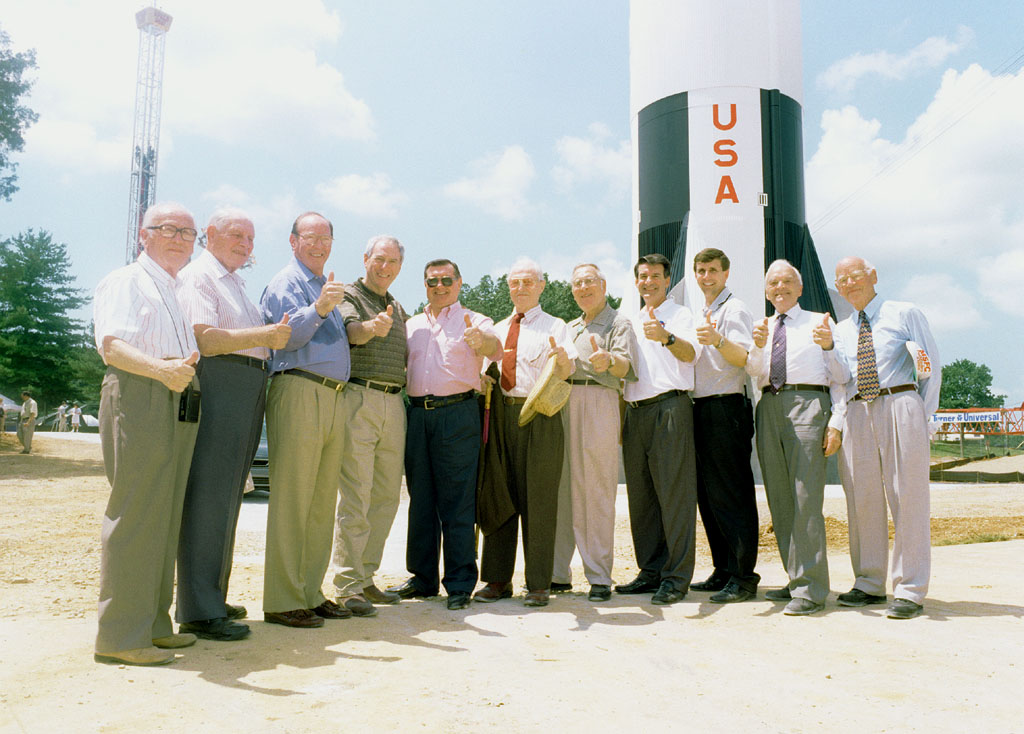
Haeussermann stands second from right in this group of dignitaries at the dedication of a full-scale standing replica of the Saturn V at the U.S. Space & Rocket Center, 1999.

Haeussermann remained an enthusiastic supporter of the space program and attended reunions and public events regularly until his death.

=== Work in guidance and control ===
Haeussermann's main area of work was in automatic guidance and control for missiles. For example, he was instrumental in the design of the Saturn V system. He also conducted research more broadly, for instance in 3-axis attitude control and the use of Hall devices in aerospace control devices. In his late career, he examined control issues related to experiments on board the Space Shuttle.

=== Arthur Rudolph ===
Haeussermann was a colleague of Arthur Rudolph, who in the 1980s was investigated by the OSI and Eli Rosenbaum for alleged Nazi war crimes. Haeussermann was part of Rudolph's defense team.

== Works ==
- Haeussermann, W. (1965) Guidance and control of saturn launch vehicles, AIAA #65-304.
- Haeussermann, W. (1970) Description and performance of the Saturn launch vehicle's navigation, guidance, and control system , NASA TN D-5869.
- Haeussermann, W. (1971) Saturn launch vehicle's navigation guidance, and control system, Automatica 7(5), 537-556.
- Haeussermann, W. (1959) The Spherical Control Motor for Three-Axis Attitude Control of Space Vehicles, NASA TM X-50071
- Haeussermann, W. (1979) Hall devices improve electric motor efficiency, NASA MFS-23828.
- Haeussermann, W. (1976) Control requirements of the Shuttle experiments, In: Symposium on Automatic Control in Space, 7th, Rottach-Egern, West Germany, May 17–21, 1976, Volume 1. (A77-24777 10-12) Düsseldorf, VDI/VDE-Gesellschaft Mess- und Regelungstechnik, 1976, p. 97-111.
