= Gerhard Reisig =

German-American engineer and rocket scientist

- Born: Gerhard Herbert Richard Reisig; March 3, 1910; Leipzig, Germany
- Died: March 9, 2005 (aged 95); Moorhead, Minnesota, U.S.
- Education: Technical University of Dresden, Dresden (BS) (1932); Technical University of Dresden, Dresden (Diploma Engineer) (1934); Technical University of Braunschweig, Braunschweig (Dr. of Engineering) (1963)
- Spouse: Gisela Haenichen
- Children: 2

Gerhard Herbert Richard Reisig (March 3, 1910 - March 9, 2005) was a German-American engineer and rocket scientist. He worked at the Peenemünde Army Research Center during World War II and later, through Operation Paperclip, at the Marshall Space Flight Center.

== Biography ==
Reisig was born in Leipzig on March 3, 1910. As a child, he attended school at the Nikolaischule. Reisig attended university at the Technical University of Dresden, where he received a BS in engineering physics in 1932 and a Diplom-Ingenieur in 1934. Years later, in 1963, he received his Doctor of Engineering from the Technical University of Braunschweig.

After university, Reisig worked from 1935 to October 1937 at the Siemens Co. In 1937 he was hired by Wernher von Braun at Peenemünde, where Reisig joined von Braun's rocket team and continued to work until 1945. Reisig worked on the A3 and A5 designs of the Aggregat rocket series as well as sounding rocket missions using the V-2 rocket. In 1943 he began working under Walter Dornberger on the ultimately unfinished Wasserfall missile project.

Reisig was acquired in Operation Paperclip and traveled to the U.S. with von Braun's team, arriving December 6, 1945. Reisig first worked at Fort Bliss before moving to Huntsville in 1951, teaching at the Redstone Arsenal Institute of Graduate Studies beginning in 1952 as a lecturer in Aerodynamics. At some point after its founding in 1956, he was employed at the Army Ballistic Missile Agency. He began work at the Marshall Space Flight Center in 1962 as a specialist in environmental effects on rockets. Reisig stayed at the MSFC until his retirement in 1973, after which he taught at the University of Tennessee Space Institute and Concordia College in Minnesota.
