= Hans Kammler =

SS engineer general (1901–1945)

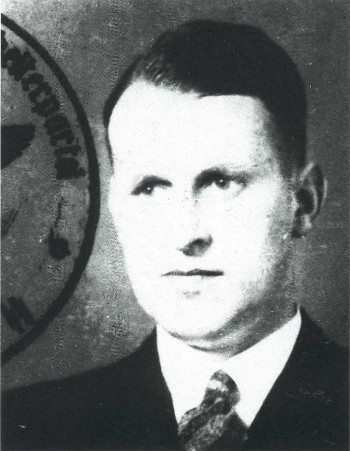
- NSDAP ID photograph, 1932
- Born: Hans Friedrich Karl Franz Kammler; 26 August 1901; Stettin, German Empire
- Disappeared: 7 May 1945; Austria
- Military career
- Allegiance: Nazi Germany
- Branch: Schutzstaffel
- Rank: SS-Obergruppenführer und General der Waffen-SS
- Commands: Office D within the SS Main Economic and Administrative Office

Hans Kammler (26 August 1901 – 9 May 1945) (Note: In 1948, a German court officially established Kammler's death date as 9 May 1945. However, as late as 2 November 1945, it was claimed he was being held in US custody.) was an SS-Obergruppenführer responsible for Nazi civil engineering projects and its top secret V-weapons program. He oversaw the construction of various Nazi concentration camps, including Auschwitz, before being put in charge of the V-2 rocket and Emergency Fighter Programs towards the end of World War II. Kammler disappeared in May 1945 during the final days of the war, although conjecture about his capture or death remains.

== Early life ==
Kammler was born in Stettin, German Empire (now Szczecin, Poland). In 1919, after volunteering for army service, he served in Freikorps Roßbach. From 1919 to 1923, he studied civil engineering at the Technische Hochschule der Freien Stadt Danzig and Munich and was awarded his doctorate of engineering (Dr. Ing.) in November 1932, following some years of practical work in local building administration.

== Nazi activist ==
In 1931, Kammler joined the Nazi Party (NSDAP), where he held a variety of administrative positions after the Nazi government came to national power in 1933. Initially, he was head of the Aviation Ministry's building department. He joined the Schutzstaffel (SS) on 20 May 1933. In 1934, he was serving the Reich's Ministry as the leader of the Reichsbund der Kleingärtner und Kleinsiedler (Reich's federation of allotment gardeners and small home owners).

Committed to the Nazi cause, engineers like Kammler "saw no contradiction between notions of blood and soil and the methods of modern organization and technology." Historian Michael Thad Allen argues that Kammler wanted to place "the best means of modern organization" at the Nazis' disposal since he believed that National Socialism was a "necessary catalyst" for modern construction. For Kammler, the concepts of "modern technology, organization, and ideologies of German supremacy" were all interwoven.

== Concentration camps and the Holocaust ==
Before joining Oswald Pohl's department at the SS Main Economic and Administrative Office (WVHA), Kammler had already been advising the SS Race and Settlement Main Office as a consultant. In June 1941, he joined the Waffen-SS. Due to Himmler's desire to increase the pace and scale of SS construction activities, Kammler was released as an adviser to the Reichskommissariat for the Reinforcement of Germandom, so his technical and managerial competencies could be exploited. In the person of Kammler, Allen writes, "technological competence and extreme Nazi fanaticism coexisted in the same man." Even Albert Speer—Adolf Hitler's chief architect—came to fear Kammler and placed him among "Himmler's most brutal and most ruthless henchmen." (Note: Speer made this comment in his work, Slave State: Heinrich Himmler’s Masterplan for SS Supremacy (London: Weidenfeld and Nicolson, 1981), 12.) Kammler was known to scrutinise the education of his subordinates as well as their ideological commitment to National Socialism, which he factored into their duty assignments and promotions.

Immediately after being assigned to the WVHA, Kammler became Pohl's deputy, where he worked with SS-Gruppenführer Richard Glücks of Office D (Concentration Camps Inspectorate), and was also named Chief of Office C, which designed and constructed all the concentration and extermination camps. On 26 September 1941—just days after the announcement of the plan for Majdanek—Kammler ordered the construction of the largest of the camps at Auschwitz. On 19 December 1941, Kammler updated Himmler about the slow progress at both Auschwitz-Birkenau and Majdanek, remarking that construction was delayed due to the freezing weather, lack of materials, and insufficient manpower. By late March 1942, the systematic mass deportation of Jews to Auschwitz had begun.

Historian Nikolaus Wachsmann states that Kammler "was intimately involved in all the major building projects in Auschwitz." For instance, in his capacity within the WVHA, Kammler oversaw the installation of more efficient cremation facilities at Auschwitz-Birkenau when the Nazis converted it into an extermination camp. Under Kammler's supervision, new crematoria were planned during August 1942 at Birkenau to facilitate burning up to one-hundred twenty thousand corpses per month.

Kammler's construction unit Amtsgruppe C was involved in the razing of the Warsaw Ghetto from April 1943 onwards.

== Secret weapons projects ==
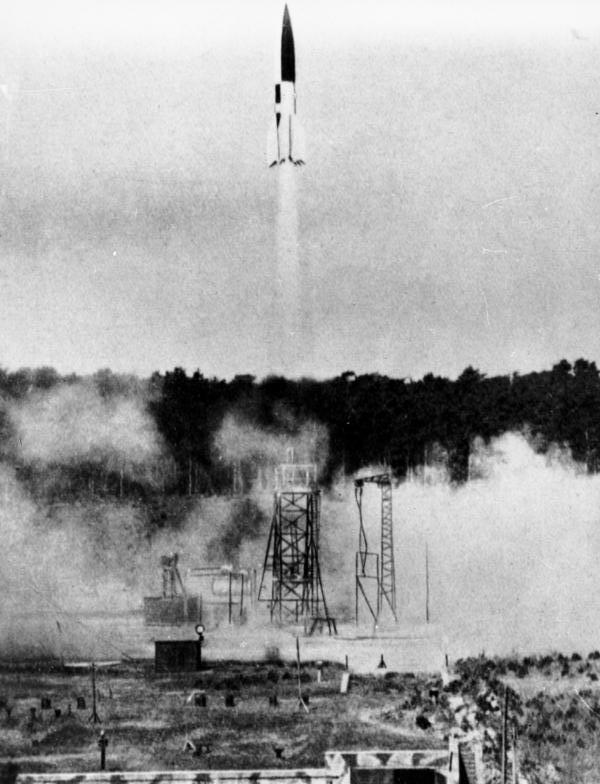
A V-2 launched from a fixed site in summer 1943

After the RAF successfully bombed the rocket production facilities at Peenemünde during August 1943, the head of the Reich Ministry of Armaments and War Production, Albert Speer, recommended transferring the V-2 rocket production underground. Hitler immediately agreed with Speer, and the two decided that the SS, with its massive supply of slave labour, was best suited for this task. As the SS construction chief, Kammler was selected to oversee the project—along with representatives Gerhard Degenkolb and Karl Maria Hettlage from Speer's ministry—which began at a huge fuel storage facility in Thuringia as Mittelwerk GmbH.

By the end of August 1943, Kammler had a sizable detachment of concentration camp inmates from Buchenwald working at the new underground installation, and before the year was out, there were so many slave labourers that another facility (Mittelbau-Dora concentration camp) had to be established. The secret weapons projects for which Kammler was given responsibility included manufacturing both the Messerschmitt Me 262 and the V-2, which Kammler—in a construction effort of ruthless brutality and speed—had in production before the end of 1943. The tunnels and weapons were built in horrendous conditions by the slave labourers from Mittelbau-Dora. Research has found that of the 60,000 people who passed through Mittelbau-Dora camp, an estimated 10,000 died producing the V2 alone, which is double the estimated 5,000 killed by the weapon system in Britain and Belgium combined. More than 20,000 died at Mittelbau-Dora in total throughout the camp's existence. Kammler's attitude towards the prisoners was utter indifference, having once exclaimed, "Don't worry about the victims. The work must proceed ahead in the shortest time possible."

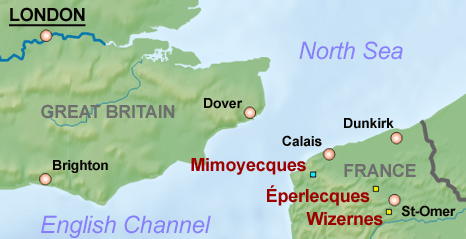
Map of the Pas-de-Calais and south-eastern England showing the location of Éperlecques and other major V-weapons sites

Due to the combination of his building experts, access to slave labour, and connections to SS facilities, Kammler became an "indispensable figure" in the armaments efforts of the SS, so much so that he was only answerable to Himmler. Speer made Kammler his representative for "special construction tasks", expecting that Kammler would commit himself to working in harmony with the ministry's main construction committee. But in March 1944, Kammler had Göring appoint him as his delegate for "special buildings" under the fighter aircraft program, which made him one of the war economy's most important managers. In April 1944, Hitler gave Kammler full control over jet-aircraft production.

In March 1944, Himmler convinced Hitler to put the V-2 project directly under SS control. On 8 August, Kammler replaced Walter Dornberger as the director, taking command and control of V-2 operations. The first rockets were launched from a site near The Hague against London on 8 September 1944. Kammler was also involved in an attempt to finish the Blockhaus d'Éperlecques near Saint-Omer, Pas-de-Calais in Northern France. The fortified bunker was to be used as a V-2 launch base but it was abandoned in September 1944 before it could be finished. On 31 January 1945, Hitler named Kammler head of all missile projects, but by this time the lack of explosives was critical, and the program was winding down. By this time, Kammler answered only to Hitler.

In March 1945, Hitler stripped Göring of his powers over aircraft support, maintenance and supply, and transferred these duties to Kammler. This culminated, in the beginning of April, with Kammler being raised to "Fuehrer's general plenipotentiary for jet aircraft".

A declassified interrogation report by a US Army field intelligence unit, dated 12 April 1945, provides the following details regarding Kammler's involvement in testing experimental rocket artillery: "On or about December 1944, [two artillery battalions] in Luxembourg and Holland were subordinated to Kammler. Both battalions turned in their 10.5 cm howitzers and were issued with new secret weapons, HDP (Hochdruckopompe, code name for a 15 cm rocket weapon), and "Rheinboot" (a 21 cm rocket weapon"). ... [Interrogees] think that Kammler was the guiding spirit, a dilettante in secret weapons, because they recall definitely that Kammler boasted on New Years Eve (1944/45) that both secret weapons had been used against orders from his superiors, "auf meine eigene Verantwortung" [transl.: "at my own risk"]."

=== Arnsberg Forest Massacre ===
In late March 1945, Kammler's car was held up on a crowded road in the Sauerland by a group of slave labourers and their families, guarded by troops of the ZV Division (V-2 rocket operators). Kammler allegedly felt he was under some "vague threat" from the slave group and ordered the ZV troops to kill them all (200 men, women, and children). The killings coincided with the evacuation of V-2 units due to the Allied advance into Germany. (Note: Two former SS men from ZV Division stated during their 1958 trial for killing Soviet and Polish workers and their families that Kammler issued the direct orders for the massacre. After the massacre, the ZV Division destroyed its V-2 equipment and became an infantry unit. Several scientific studies have been undertaken at the location to understand the nature of the massacre.)

== Disappearance and fate ==
On 1 April 1945, Kammler ordered the evacuation of 500 missile technicians to the Nazis' Alpine Fortress. Since the last V-2 on the western front had been launched in late March, on 5 April, Kammler was charged by the Oberkommando der Wehrmacht to command the defence of the Nordhausen area, where Mittelwerk was located. However, rather than defend the missile construction works, he immediately ordered the destruction of all the "special V-1 equipment" at the Syke storage site.

In the final weeks of the war in Europe, Kammler's movements became sketchy and contradictory. Further evidence of Kammler's activities consists of a telegram sent from Kammler to Speer, Himmler and Göring on 16 April, informing them of the creation of a "message centre" at Munich and the appointment of an operations chief for the construction of the Messerschmitt Me 262. On 20 April, he reportedly arrived with a group of technicians at Himmler’s Kommandostelle near Salzburg.

On 22 April, he caught up with Wernher von Braun and Walter Dornberger, both of whom were reported to have made contact with the Allies, in Oberammergau, Bavaria. He failed to agree on a joint course of action with them.

A wartime diary, relating to the surrender of the mountain resort town Garmisch-Partenkirchen to Allied troops, reports the arrival of Kammler and some 600 staff in a motorised column carrying "high-quality research material" in Oberammergau on 22 April 1945. According to this source, he came into conflict with the local commander, lieutenant Burger, over failing to seek permission to establish his quarters in the area. In Oberammergau, Kammler initially stayed in the hotel of Alois Lang, which he had commandeered for indefinite use on 9 February 1945, and then moved quarters to the Linderhof Palace in nearby Ettal. (Note: Wernher von Braun, who admitted Kammler was in Oberammergau during April 1945, reported having overheard a discussion between Kammler and his aide-de-camp in which Kammler said he planned to hide in nearby Ettal Abbey. The senior staff engineer Rudolf Brée, judged untrustworthy by the British intelligence, offered a similar story to his interrogators in February 1947.) On 23 April, Kammler sent a radio message to his office manager at Berlin, ordering him to organise the immediate destruction of the "V-1 equipment near Berlin" and then to go to Munich. On 27 April, American tanks were reported in Schongau, 35 km to the northwest of Oberammergau. On the morning of 28 April, anticipating their entry into Oberammergau that day, Kammler left the town with his staff.

His next stop, in late April/early May, was at the Villa Mendelssohn, the headquarters of SS Special Inspection IV, in Ebensee, some 270 km to the east of Oberammergau. Ebensee was the site of a concentration camp and arms factory overseen by him and part of the half-mythical Alpine Fortress complex. On the early morning of 4 May, he ordered the immediate transfer of the Ebensee office to Prague, apparently denounced by his subordinates as a suicide mission.

He drove in the direction of Linz (100 km from Ebensee), captured by the American troops on 5 May, and became separated from others in his convoy, including Karl Saur. On 6 May, he was alleged by Gottlob Berger, head of the SS Main Office, to have met with him in Kirchdorf in Tirol, almost 200 km west of Ebensee. On 7 May, British intelligence intercepted a message signed by Kammler asking the SS unit at the Leitmeritz concentration camp, a suspected V-3 production site, to report the arrival of his staff there. It is unclear whether he might have sent it after his capture.

Kammler then went missing. On 2 November 1945, however, Brigadier General George Clement McDonald (1892–1969), the director of intelligence of the US Air Forces in Europe, acting under the authority of the Air Force Intelligence Service chief in Washington, DC, commissioned the interrogation of Kammler to chief investigator Ernst Englander, indicating particular interest in German underground installations. This is understood as evidence that Kammler was by then still alive and in US custody.

=== Testimonies by other Nazis ===
In a sworn statement on 16 October 1959, Kammler's driver, Kurt Preuk, stated that Kammler's date of death was "about 10 May 1945", but that he did not know the cause of death. On 7 September 1965, Heinz Zeuner (a wartime aide of Kammler's), stated that Kammler had died on 7 May 1945 and that his corpse had been observed by Zeuner, Preuk and others. All the eyewitnesses consulted were certain that the cause of death was cyanide poisoning. In their accounts of Kammler's movements, Preuk and Zeuner claimed that he left Linderhof near Oberammergau on 28 April 1945 for a tank conference at Salzburg and then went to Ebensee (where tank tracks were manufactured). According to Preuk and Zeuner, he then travelled back from Ebensee to visit his wife in the Tyrol region, when he gave her two cyanide capsules. The next day, 5 May, at around 4 am, he is said to have departed Tyrol for Prague. Both Preuk's and Zeuner's accounts are judged to be "fictitious narratives that ... only served the purpose of obscuring the actual events and supporting the pension claims of Jutta Kammler for which her husband had to be officially declared deceased".

In a 1969 book, Wernher von Braun: Mein Leben für die Raumfahrt, journalist Bernd Ruland claimed Kammler arrived in Prague by aircraft on 4 May 1945, following which, he and 21 SS men defended a bunker against an attack by more than 500 Czech resistance fighters on 9 May. During the attack, one of Kammler's aides-de-camp shot Kammler to prevent his capture. This version can reportedly be traced to Walter Dornberger, who claimed to have heard it from eyewitnesses.

=== Official verdict ===
On 9 July 1945, Kammler's wife petitioned to have him declared dead as of 9 May 1945. She provided a statement by Kammler's driver, Kurt Preuk, according to which Preuk had personally seen "the corpse of Kammler and been present at his burial" on 9 May 1945. The District Court of Berlin-Charlottenburg ruled on 7 September 1948 that his death was officially established as 9 May 1945.

Both Preuk and Zeuner maintained their version of events when interviewed in the 1990s. Some support for this version of events came from letters written by Ingeborg Alix Prinzessin zu Schaumburg-Lippe, a female member of the SS-Helferinnenkorps, to Kammler’s wife in 1951 and 1955. In these, she affirmed that Kammler had said goodbye to her on 7 May 1945 in Prague, stating that the Americans were after him, had made him offers, but that he had refused and that they would not "get him alive".

== Post-war searches ==
US occupation forces conducted various inquiries into Kammler’s whereabouts, beginning with the headquarters of 12th Army ordering a complete inventory of all personnel involved in missile production on 21 May 1945. This resulted in the creation of a file for Kammler, stating that he was possibly in Munich. The CIC noted that he had been seen shortly prior to the arrival of US troops in Oberjoch.

The Combined Intelligence Objectives Sub-Committee (CIOS) in London ordered a search for him in early July 1945. Members of the 12th Army replied that he was last seen on 8 or 9 April in the Harz region. In August, Kammler's name made "List 13" of the UN for Nazi war criminals. Only in 1948 did the CIOS receive the information that Kammler reportedly fled to Prague and had committed suicide. Original blueprints of Kammler’s major projects were later found in the personal property of Samuel Goudsmit, the scientific leader of the Alsos Mission.

A CIC report from April 1946 listed Kammler among SS officers known to be outside Germany and considered to be of special interest to the CIC. In mid-July 1945, the head of the Gmunden CIC office, Major Morrisson, interviewed an unnamed German on the issue of a numbered account associated with construction sites for plane and missile production formerly run by the SS. A report published years later, in late 1947 or early 1948, stated that only Kammler and two other persons had access to the account. The report also said that "shortly after the occupation, Hans Kammler appeared at CIC Gmunden and gave a statement on operations at Ebensee". The CIC notes on the interview give no name, but the interviewee must have been one of the three people with access to the account. Aside from Kammler, one was known to have left Austria in May 1945; the other was in a POW camp during July.

In 1949, a report written by one Oskar Packe on Kammler was filed by the US Denazification office in Hesse. The report stated that Kammler had been arrested by US troops on 9 May 1945 at the Messerschmitt works at Oberammergau. However, Kammler and some other senior SS personnel had managed to escape in the direction of Austria or Italy. Packe did not believe the reports about a suicide, as these were contradicted "by the detailed information from the CIC" about arrest and escape.

Donald W. Richardson (1917–1997), a former OSS special agent involved in the Alsos Mission, claimed to be "the man who brought Kammler to the US". Shortly before he died, Richardson reportedly told his sons about his experience during and after the war, including Operation Paperclip. According to them, Richardson claimed to have supervised Kammler until 1947. Kammler was supposedly "interned at a place of maximum security, with no hope, no mercy and without seeing the light of day until he hanged himself". In 2019, the Woodrow Wilson International Center for Scholars published evidence that Kammler was indeed captured and interviewed by Americans during May 1945 in Germany; however, none of the evidence substantiated his stay and later suicide in the U.S., as Richardson originally claimed.

== See also ==
- Arthur Rudolph
- Jakob Sporrenberg
- List SS-Obergruppenführer

== Sources ==
- Allen, Michael Thad (2002). The Business of Genocide: The SS, Slave Labor, and the Concentration Camps. London and Chapel Hill: The University of North Carolina Press. ISBN 978-0-80782-677-5.
- Bornemann, Manfred; Broszat, Martin (1970). "Das KL Dora-Mittelbau". Studien zur Geschichte der Konzentrationslager. Schriftenreihe der Vierteljahrshefte für Zeitgeschichte (in German). 21. Stuttgart: 154–198. doi:10.1524/9783486703627.154. ISBN 978-3-486-70362-7.
- Brunelli, Roberto (2014). "La fuga segreta del custode dell'atomica nazista (25 April 2014)" [The Secret Escape of the Keeper of the Nazi Atomic Bomb]. la Repubblica (in Italian).
- Dear, Ian; Foot, M.R.D., eds. (1995). The Oxford Guide to World War II. Oxford; New York: Oxford University Press. ISBN 978-0-19-534096-9.
- Döbert, Frank; Karlsch, Rainer (2019). "CWIHP Working Paper #91 – Hans Kammler, Hitler's Last Hope, in American Hands". Woodrow Wilson International Center for Scholars.
- Dvorsky, Georg (12 March 2019). "Hundreds of Artifacts from Notorious Nazi Massacre Uncovered in German Forest".
- Gais, Huber (15 May 1945). "Ein Kriegsende – Garmisch-Partenkirchen in den letzten Apriltagen 1945". Archived from the original on 1 November 2013.
- Haunschmied, Rudolf A.; Mills, Jan-Ruth; Witzany-Durda, Siegi (2008). St. Georgen, Gusen, Mauthausen: Concentration Camp Mauthausen Reconsidered. Books on Demand Gmbh. ISBN 978-3-83347-610-5.
- Höhne, Heinz (2001). The Order of the Death's Head: The Story of Hitler's SS. New York: Penguin Press. ISBN 978-0-14139-012-3.
- Karlsch, Rainer (2005). Hitlers Bombe. Die geheime Geschichte der deutschen Kernwaffenversuche. München: Deutsche Verlags-Anstalt. ISBN 3-421-05809-1.
- U.S. Army, Mobile Field Interrogation Unit No. 1, Report No. 1/57 - PW INTELLIGENCE BULLETIN (Report). U.S. National Archives, College Park. Record Group 165, Entry Number NM-84/79, Security Classified Intell. Reports, "P Files". Stack 390, Row 34, Compartment 25, Shelf 3, Box 1916. 12 April 1945.
- Karlsch, Rainer (2014). "Was wurde aus Hans Kammler? (summary of an article in Zeitschrift für Geschichtswissenschaft, Heft 6, 2014)". Frankfurter Allgemeine am Sonntag (in German). Frankfurt: 52–53.
- Kitchen, Martin (2015). Speer: Hitler's Architect. New Haven and London: Yale University Press. ISBN 978-0-30021-600-4.
- Klee, Ernst (2016). Personenlexikon zum Dritten Reich: Wer war was vor und nach 1945 (in German). Hamburg: Nikol Verlag. ISBN 978-3-86820-311-0.
- Müller, Rolf-Dieter (2003). "Albert Speer and Armaments Policy in Total War". In Bernhard Kroener; Rolf-Dieter Müller; Hans Umbreit (eds.). Germany and the Second World War. Vol. V [Organization and Mobilization of the German Sphere of Power–Part 2, Wartime Administration, Economy, and Manpower Resources, 1942–1944/45]. Translated by Dean Cook-Radmore, Ewald Osers, Barry Smerin, and Barbara Wilson. Oxford and New York: Clarendon Press. ISBN 0-19-820873-1.
- Naasner, Walter (1998). SS-Wirtschaft und SS-Verwaltung (in German). Droste. ISBN 3-7700-1603-3.
- Neufeld, Michael J. (2013). The Rocket and the Reich: Peenemunde and the Coming of the Ballistic Missile Era. Washington DC: Smithsonian Books. ISBN 978-1-58834-467-0.
- Niewyk, Donald; Nicosia, Francis (2000). The Columbia Guide to the Holocaust. New York: Columbia University Press. ISBN 978-0-23111-201-7.
- Piszkiewicz, Dennis (2007). The Nazi Rocketeers: Dreams of Space and Crimes of War. Stackpole Books. ISBN 978-0-8117-3387-8.
- Post, Bernhard (16 December 2004). "80,000 Cremation Capacity Per Month Not Sufficient for Auschwitz – New Document". The Holocaust History Project. Archived from the original on 1 April 2012.
- Ruland, Bernd (1969). Wernher von Braun: Mein Leben fur die Raumfahrt (in German). Offenburg: Burda Verlag. OCLC 874228370.
- Schulte, Jan Erik (2001). Zwangsarbeit und Vernichtung: das Wirtschaftsimperium der SS: Oswald Pohl und das SS-Wirtschafts-Verwaltungshauptamt, 1933–1945 (in German). Wien: F. Schöningh. ISBN 978-3-50678-245-8.
- Smelser, Ronald M. (2000). Enrico Syring (ed.). Die SS: Elite unter dem Totenkopf, 30 Lebensläufe (in German). Wein: F. Schöningh. ISBN 978-3-50678-562-6.
- Solly, Meillan (15 March 2019). "400 Artifacts Unearthed at Site of Nazi Massacre Targeting Polish, Soviet P.O.W.s".
- Stargardt, Nicholas (2015). The German War: A Nation Under Arms, 1939–1945. New York: Basic Books. ISBN 978-0-46501-899-4.
- Tooze, Adam (2007). The Wages of Destruction: The Making and Breaking of the Nazi Economy. New York: Viking. ISBN 978-0-670-03826-8.
- U.S. Army (MFIU) (12 April 1945). PW Intelligence Bulletin, Report No. 1/57 (U.S. Army POW/field interrogation report). Mobile Field Interrogation Unit: PW Intelligence Bulletins. Probably RG 226 (OSS), box/folder ID TBD. NARA, College Park, Maryland: U.S. Army, Mobile Field Interrogation Unit (MFIU) No. 1.
- Utschneider, Ludwig (2000). "Rüstungsindustrie in Oberammergau im Zweiten Weltkrieg" (in German). Historical Society of Oberammergau. Archived from the original on 28 May 2023.
- van Pelt, Robert Jan (2002). The Case for Auschwitz: Evidence From the Irving Trial. Bloomington: Indiana University Press. ISBN 978-0-253-34016-0.
- Uziel, Daniel (2011). Arming the Luftwaffe: The German Aviation Industry in World War II. McFarland. ISBN 978-0-78646-521-7.
- Wachsmann, Nikolaus (2015). KL: A History of the Nazi Concentration Camps. New York: Farrar, Straus and Giroux. ISBN 978-0-37411-825-9.
- Yahil, Leni (1990). The Holocaust: The Fate of European Jewry, 1932–1945. Oxford and New York: Oxford University Press. ISBN 0-19-504522-X.
