= Vladimir Vavilov =

Vladimir Vavilov may refer to:

- Vladimir Vavilov (composer) (1925–1973), Russian guitarist and composer
- Vladimir Vavilov (football) (b. 1988), Russian footballer
