= Peenemünde Army Research Center =

Research center under Nazi Germany

- Peenemünde, Germany
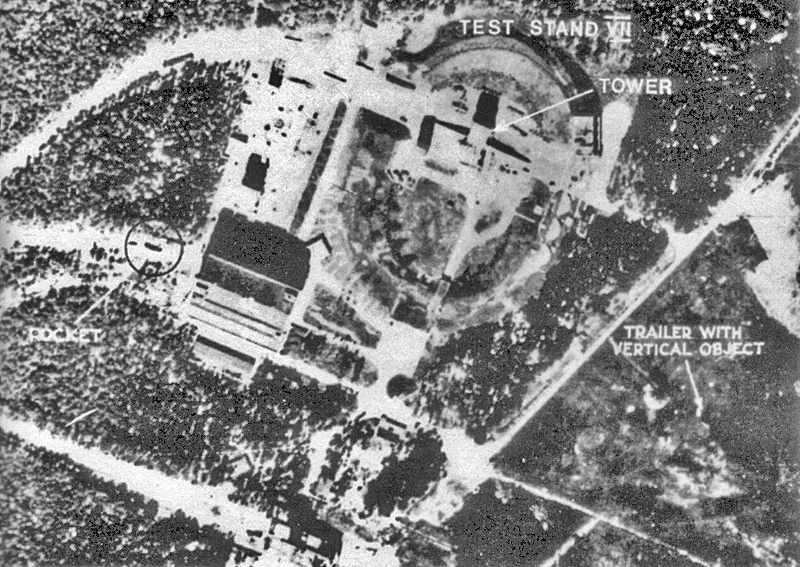
- 1943 RAF photo-recon of Test Stand VII at the Peenemünde Army Research Center

Location
- Coordinates: 54.15°N 13.80°E

Site history
- Built: 1937
- In use: World War II
- Battles/wars: Operation Crossbow (Bombing of Peenemünde in World War II)

The Peenemünde Army Research Center (German: Heeresversuchsanstalt Peenemünde, (Note: An alternative spelling is Heeresversuchsstelle Peenemünde, and Heeresanstalt Peenemünde appears on a German document with Wasserfall velocity calculations. German pronunciation: [peːnəˈmʏndə].) HVP) was founded in 1937 as one of five military proving grounds under the German Army Weapons Office (Heereswaffenamt). Several German guided missiles and rockets of World War II were developed by the HVP, including the V-2 rocket. The works were attacked by the British in Operation Crossbow from August 1943, before falling to the Soviets in May 1945.

== History ==
On April 2, 1936, the aviation ministry paid 750,000 reichsmarks to the town of Wolgast for the whole Northern peninsula of the Baltic island of Usedom. By the middle of 1938, the Army facility had been separated from the Luftwaffe facility and was nearly complete, with personnel moved from Kummersdorf. The Army Research Center (Peenemünde Ost) consisted of Werk Ost and Werk Süd, while Werk West (Peenemünde West) was the Luftwaffe Test Site (Erprobungsstelle der Luftwaffe), one of the four test and research facilities of the Luftwaffe, with its headquarters facility at Erprobungsstelle Rechlin.

== HVP organization ==
Major-General Walter Dornberger was the military leader of the V-2 rocket programme and other projects.

Wernher von Braun was the HVP technical director (Dr. Walter Thiel was deputy director until 1943) and there were nine major departments:

1. Technical Design Office (Walter J H "Papa" Riedel)
2. Aeroballistics and Mathematics Laboratory (Dr. Hermann Steuding)
3. Wind Tunnel (Dr. Rudolf Hermann)
4. Materials Laboratory (Dr. Mäder)
5. Flight, Guidance, and Telemetering Devices (German: BSM) (Dr. Ernst Steinhoff and his deputy Helmut Gröttrup)
6. Development and Fabrication Laboratory (Arthur Rudolph)
7. Test Laboratory (Klaus Riedel)
8. Future Projects Office (Ludwig Roth)
9. Purchasing Office (Mr. Genthe)

The Measurements Group (Gerhard Reisig) was part of the BSM, and additional departments included the Production Planning Directorate (Detmar Stahlknecht), the Personnel Office (Richard Sundermeyer), and the Drawings Change Service. Erich Apel was head of a development department, Konrad Dannenberg was Walter Riedel's deputy, Kurt H. Debus was engineer in charge at Test Stand VII, and Eberhard Rees managed V-2 rocket fabrication and assembly.

== Guided missile and rocket development ==
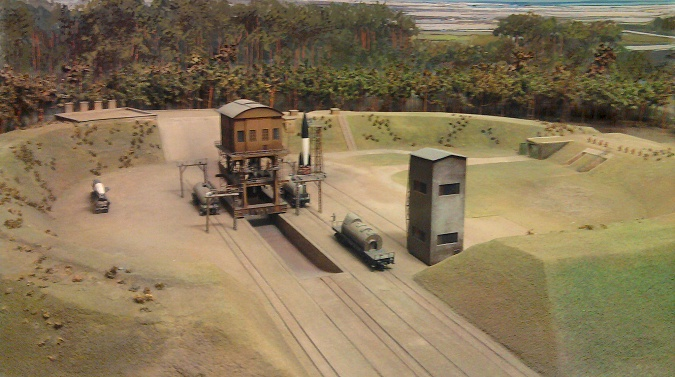
A launchpad at Peenemünde as depicted in a miniature at the Deutsches Museum, Munich

Several German guided missiles and rockets of World War II were developed by the HVP, including the V-2 rocket (A-4) (see test launches), and the Wasserfall (35 Peenemünde trial firings), Schmetterling, Rheintochter, Taifun, and Enzian missiles. The HVP also performed preliminary design work on very-long-range missiles for use against the United States. That project was sometimes called "V-3" and its existence is well documented. The Peenemünde establishment also developed other technologies such as the first closed-circuit television system in the world, installed at Test Stand VII to track the launching rockets.

According to Walter Dornberger, "Rockets worked under water." In the summer of 1942, led by Ernst Steinhoff, Pennemünde worked on sea launches, either from launching racks on the deck of a submerged submarine, or from towed floats. Dornberger summarized the launches from a depth of 30 to 50 feet (9 to 15 metres), "A staggering sight it was when those twenty heavy powder rockets suddenly rose, with a rush and a roar, from the calm waters of the Baltic."

=== Aerodynamic Institute ===
The supersonic wind tunnel at Peenemünde's "Aerodynamic Institute" eventually had nozzles for speeds up to the record speed of Mach 4.4 (in 1942 or 1943), as well as an innovative desiccant system to reduce the condensation clouding caused by the use of liquid oxygen, in 1940. Led by Rudolph Hermann, who arrived in April 1937 from the University of Aachen, the number of technical staff members reached two hundred in 1943, and it also included Hermann Kurzweg of the University of Leipzig and Walter Haeussermann.

=== Heimat-Artillerie-Park 11 ===
Initially set up under the HVP as a rocket training battery (Number 444), Heimat-Artillerie-Park 11 Karlshagen/Pomerania (HAP 11) also contained the A-A Research Command North for the testing of anti-aircraft rockets. The chemist Magnus von Braun, the youngest brother of Wernher von Braun, was employed in the attempted development at Peenemünde of anti-aircraft rockets. These were never very successful as weapons during World War II. Their development as practical weapons took another decade of development in the United States and in the U.S.S.R.

=== Peenemünde V-2 production plant ===
In November 1938, Walther von Brauchitsch ordered construction of an A-4 production plant at Peenemünde, including a coal-fueled power plant and second liquid oxygen plant sized to support future fuel needs in the field. In January 1939, Walter Dornberger created a subsection of Wa Pruf 11 for planning the Peenemünde Production Plant project, headed by G. Schubert, a senior Army civil servant. By midsummer 1943, the first trial runs of the assembly-line in the Production Works at Werke Süd were made, but after the end of July 1943 when the enormous hangar Fertigungshalle 1 (F-1, "Mass Production Plant No. 1") was just about to go into operation, Operation Hydra bombed Peenemünde. On August 26, 1943, Albert Speer called a meeting with Hans Kammler, Dornberger, Gerhard Degenkolb, and Karl Otto Saur to negotiate the move of A-4 main production to an underground factory in the Harz mountains. In early September, Peenemünde machinery and personnel for production (including Alban Sawatzki, Arthur Rudolph, and about ten engineers) were moved to the Mittelwerk, which also received machinery and personnel from the two other planned A-4 assembly sites. On October 13, 1943, the Peenemünde prisoners from the small F-1 concentration camp boarded rail cars bound for Kohnstein mountain.

== Operation Crossbow ==
Two Polish janitors of Peenemünde's Camp Trassenheide in early 1943 provided maps, sketches and reports to Polish Home Army Intelligence, and in June 1943 British intelligence had received two such reports which identified the "rocket assembly hall", "experimental pit", and "launching tower". The Allies also received information about the V-1 and V-2 rockets and the production sites from the Austrian resistance group around the priest Heinrich Maier. The group later discovered by the Gestapo was in contact with Allen Dulles, the head of the US secret service OSS in Switzerland, and informed him about the research in Peenemünde.

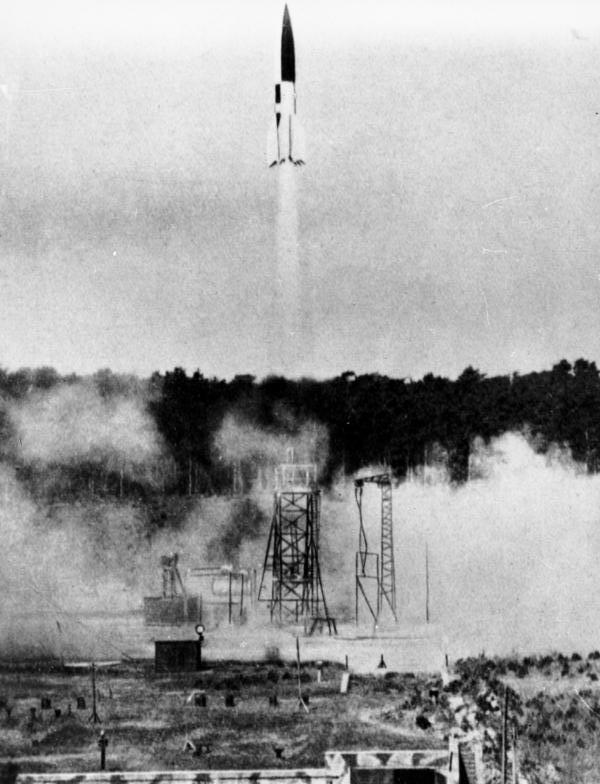
V-2 launch in Peenemünde (1943)

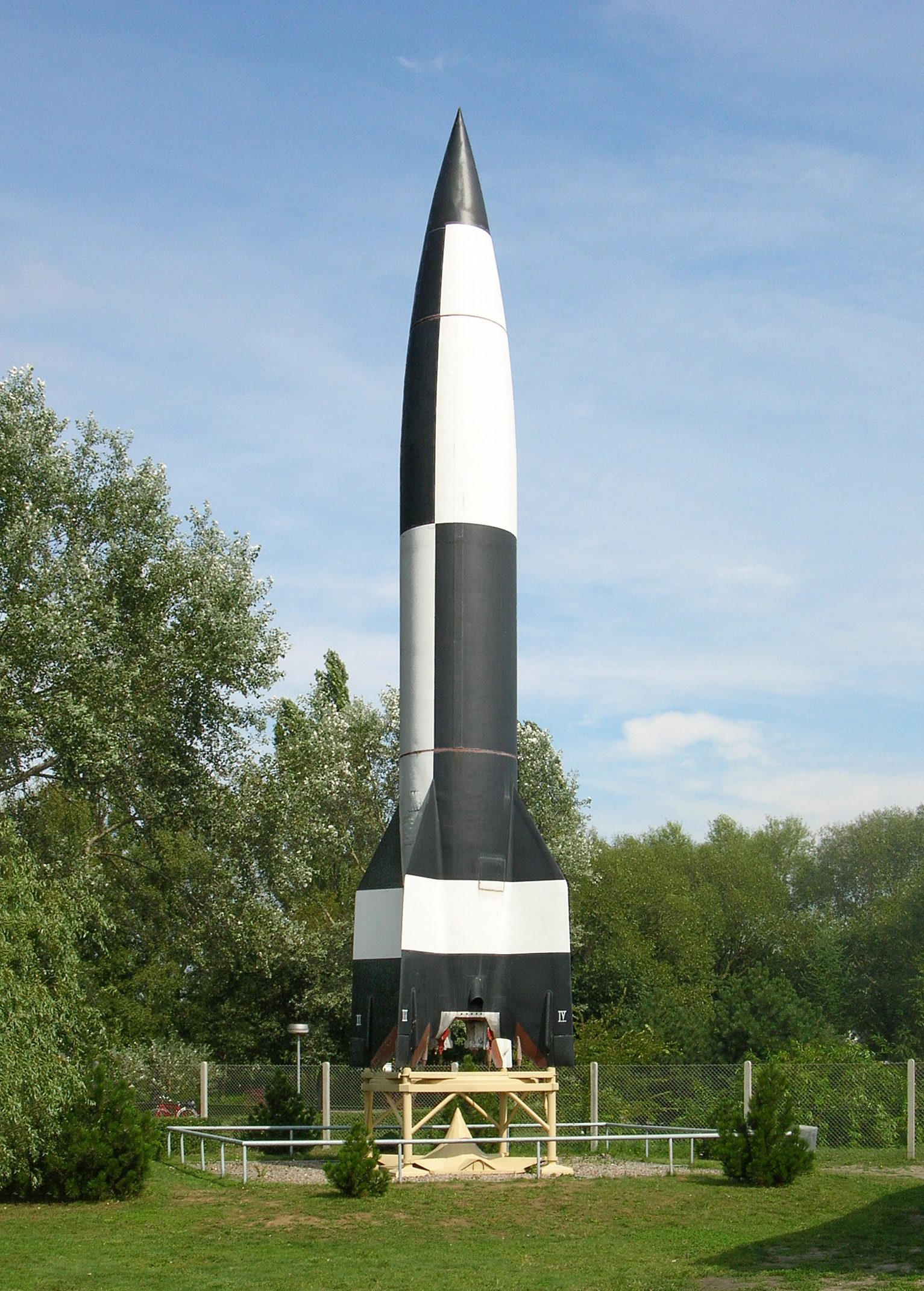
V2 in the Peenemünde Museum

As the opening attack of the British Crossbow operations against German rocket weapons, the Operation Hydra bombing raid attacked the HVP's "Sleeping & Living Quarters" (to specifically target scientists), then the "Factory Workshops", and finally the "Experimental Station" on the night of August 17/18, 1943. The Polish janitors were given advance warning of the attack, but the workers could not leave due to SS security and the facility had no air raid shelters for the prisoners. Fifteen British and Canadian airmen who were killed on the raid were buried by the Germans in unmarked graves within the secure perimeter. Their recovery at the end of the war was prevented by the Russians authorities and the bodies remain there to this day.

A year later on July 18, August 4, and August 25, the U.S. Eighth Air Force conducted three additional Peenemünde raids to counter suspected hydrogen peroxide production.

== Evacuation ==
As with the move of the V-2 Production Works to the Mittelwerk, the complete withdrawal of the development of guided missiles was approved by the Army and SS in October 1943. On August 26, 1943, at a meeting in Albert Speer's office, Hans Kammler suggested moving the A-4 Development Works to a proposed underground site in Austria. After a site survey in September by Papa Riedel and Schubert, Kammler chose the code name Zement (cement) for it in December, and work to blast a cavern into a cliff in Ebensee near Lake Traunsee commenced in January 1944. To build the tunnels, a concentration camp (a sub unit of Mauthausen-Gusen) was erected in the vicinity of the planned production sites. Speer stopped the evacuation to Ebensee because the site was needed for even more urgent war priorities.

In early 1944, construction work started for the test stands and launching pads in the Austrian Alps (code name Salamander), with target areas planned for the Tatra Mountains, the Arlberg range, and the area of the Ortler mountain. Other evacuation locations included:

- Hans Lindenmayr's valve laboratory near Friedland moved to a castle near the village of Leutenberg, 10 km (6 mi) south of Saalfeld near the Bavarian border.
- the materials testing laboratory moved to an air base at Anklam
- the wind tunnels moved to Kochel (then after the war, to the White Oak, Maryland-located U. S. Navy's Naval Ordnance Laboratory)
- Engine testing and calibration to underground facilities with dedicated liquid oxygen manufacturing at Lehesten and Zipf

Thuringia

For people being relocated from Peenemünde, the new organization was to be designated Entwicklungsgemeinschaft Mittelbau (English: Mittelbau Development Company) and Kammler's order to relocate to Thuringia arrived by teleprinter on January 31, 1945. On February 3, 1945, at the last meeting at Peenemünde held regarding the relocation, the HVP consisted of A-4 development/ modification (1940 people), A-4b development (27), Wasserfall and Taifun development (1455), support and administration (760). The first train departed on February 17 with 525 people en route to Thuringia (including Bleicherode, Sangerhausen (district), and Bad Sachsa) and the evacuation was complete in mid-March.

Occupied Poland

Another reaction to the aerial bombing was the creation of a back-up research test range, the Blizna V-2 missile launch site in southeastern Poland. Carefully camouflaged, this secret facility was built by 2000 prisoners from the concentration camp at the SS-Truppenübungsplatz Heidelager. The Polish resistance Home Army (Armia Krajowa) captured an intact V2 rocket here in 1943. It had been launched but didn't explode and was later retrieved intact from the Bug River and transferred secretly to London.

== Post-war ==
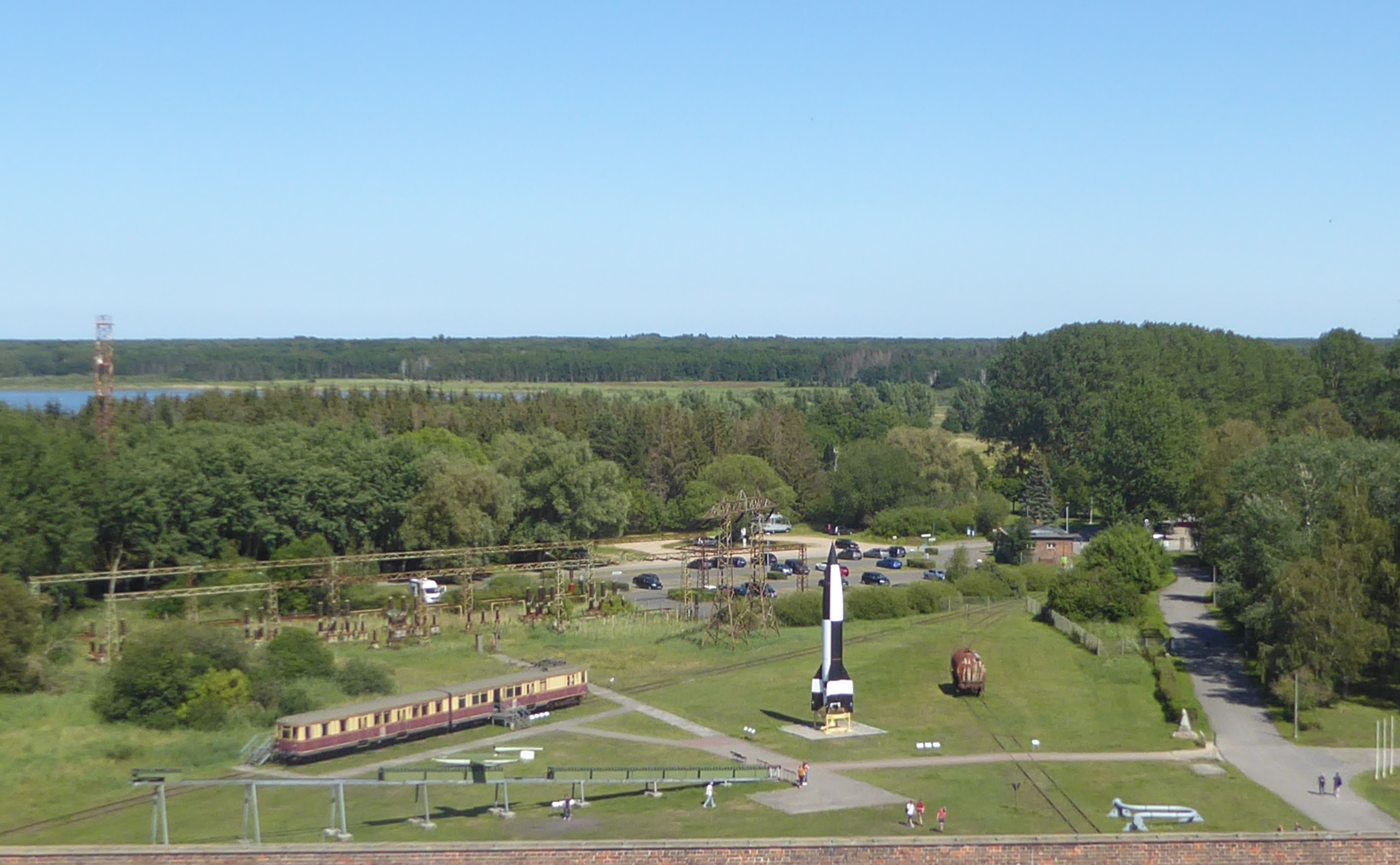
2020 07 23 Peenemünde with V1, V2 and Stadtbahn exhibits

The last V-2 launch at Peenemünde happened in February 1945, and on May 5, 1945, the soldiers of the Soviet 2nd Belorussian Front under General Konstantin Rokossovsky captured the seaport of Swinemünde and all of Usedom Island. Soviet infantrymen under the command of Major Anatole Vavilov stormed the installations at Peenemünde and found "75 percent wreckage". All of the research buildings and rocket test stands had been demolished.

At the end of April 1945, a group of more than 450 important rocket scientists from Peenemünde were captured by the U.S. Army in Oberammergau while Wernher von Braun, Walter Dornberger and several others surrendered in Reutte on May 2, 1945. As part of Operation Paperclip, a group of 127 engineers was eventually contracted for the continuation of the work at the White Sands Proving Grounds in the USA. Only a few members of the previous HVP staff, such as Helmut Gröttrup and Erich Apel, signed a contract with the Soviets and were forcibly transferred to the USSR as part of Operation Osoaviakhim in October 1946.

Although rumors spread that the Soviet space program revived Peenemünde as a test range, more destruction of the technical facilities of Peenemünde took place between 1948 and 1961. Only the power station, the airport, and the railroad link to Zinnowitz remained functional. The gas plant for the production of liquid oxygen still lies in ruins at the entrance to Peenemünde. Very little remains of most of the other Nazi German facilities there.

The Peenemünde Historical Technical Museum opened in 1992 in the shelter control room and the area of the former power station and is an anchor point of ERIH, the European Route of Industrial Heritage.

The main turbine hall of the Peenemünde plant has been used a concert venue, including a 2022 performance by the New York Philharmonic orchestra and the Baltic Sea Philharmonic as part of the Usedom Classical Music Festival.

== See also ==
- Aggregate (rocket family)
- Mikhail Devyataev

== Bibliography ==
- Neufeld, Michael J. (1995). The Rocket and the Reich: Peenemünde and the Coming of the Ballistic Missile Era. New York: The Free Press. ISBN 978-0-02-922895-1 – via archive.org.
