= Historical Technical Museum, Peenemünde =

Coordinates: 54°8′16″N 13°46′8″E

The Peenemünde Historical Technical Museum
- Historisch-Technisches Museum Peenemünde
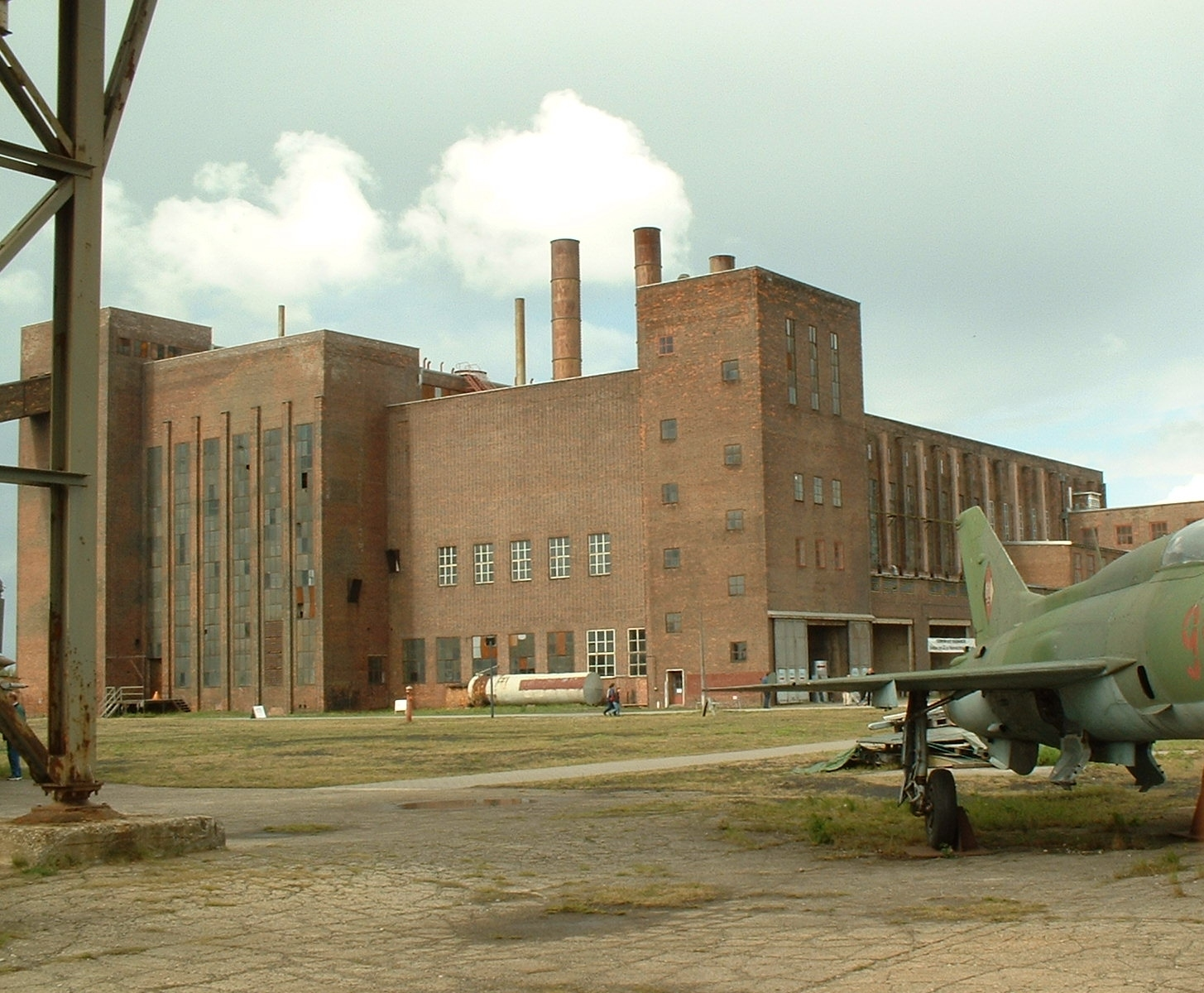
- Power Station exhibition building
- Former name: Peenemünde Information Centre for History and Technology
- Established: 1991
- Location: Peenemünde, Germany
- Type: Technology museum
- Visitors: 222,000 (2008)
- Director: Michael Gericke
- Website: Official website

The Peenemünde Historical Technical Museum (German: Historisch-Technisches Museum Peenemünde or HTM), former "Peenemünde Information Centre for History and Technology" (German: Historisch-Technisches Informationszentrum Peenemünde or HTI), is a museum, founded in 1991, in the observation bunker and site of the former power station in Peenemünde on the island of Usedom in eastern Mecklenburg-Vorpommern in Germany. The museum is dedicated to the history of the Peenemünde Army Research Centre and the Luftwaffe test site of "Peenemünde-West", especially the rockets and missiles developed there between 1936 and 1945. Since January 2007 the information centre has become an anchor point on the European Route of Industrial Heritage (ERIH), a Europe-wide network of industrial monuments, and a part of the ERIH themed routes for Energy and Transport & Communication.

In 2008 the museum had around 222,000 visitors including many school classes. Around €6.5 M were invested in the museum's renovation and expansion; a further investment of €3.9 M is planned. In 2002 the HTM was given a Coventry Cross of Nails and in 2013 the European Union Prize for Cultural Heritage/Europa Nostra Award.

== Exhibition ==
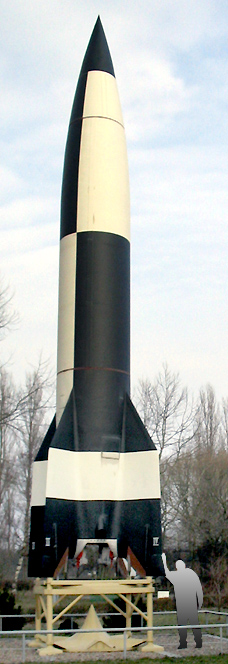
A4-Modell (HTI Peenemünde)

The main purpose of the exhibition in the power station is to be a memorial site where visitors can learn from exhibits, documents and films about the fateful pact made by the rocket engineers around Wernher von Braun with former powers in order to develop the aerospace industry.

In the mid-1960s, building on his technical experience from Peenemünde, Wernher von Braun led the design team which developed the Saturn V rocket for NASA that was used to fly to the moon. The role of the former rocket engineer in Peenemünde, however, was to develop weapons of war. Films show visitors how V-1 flying bombs worked.

These experiences formed the basis for the development of nuclear missiles by the Allies after the war. According to documents in the exhibition even Peenemünde experts took part, including in Great Britain and France, where they helped to develop the Force de Frappe.

As part of a detailed chronicle about the test site, the living and working conditions of the forced labourers and prisoners of war in Peenemünde is illustrated. In addition, there is extensive information on concentration camp prisoners, who assembled the V1-flying bombs in Bavaria and Austria under inhuman conditions.

There is a chapel near the site which commemorates all the victims.

== Open air displays ==
Amongst the showpieces on display in the open-air part of the site are a replica V-1 flying bomb (Fieseler Fi 103) and the A4 rocket.

Exhibits in the Peenemünde Historical Technical Museum include:

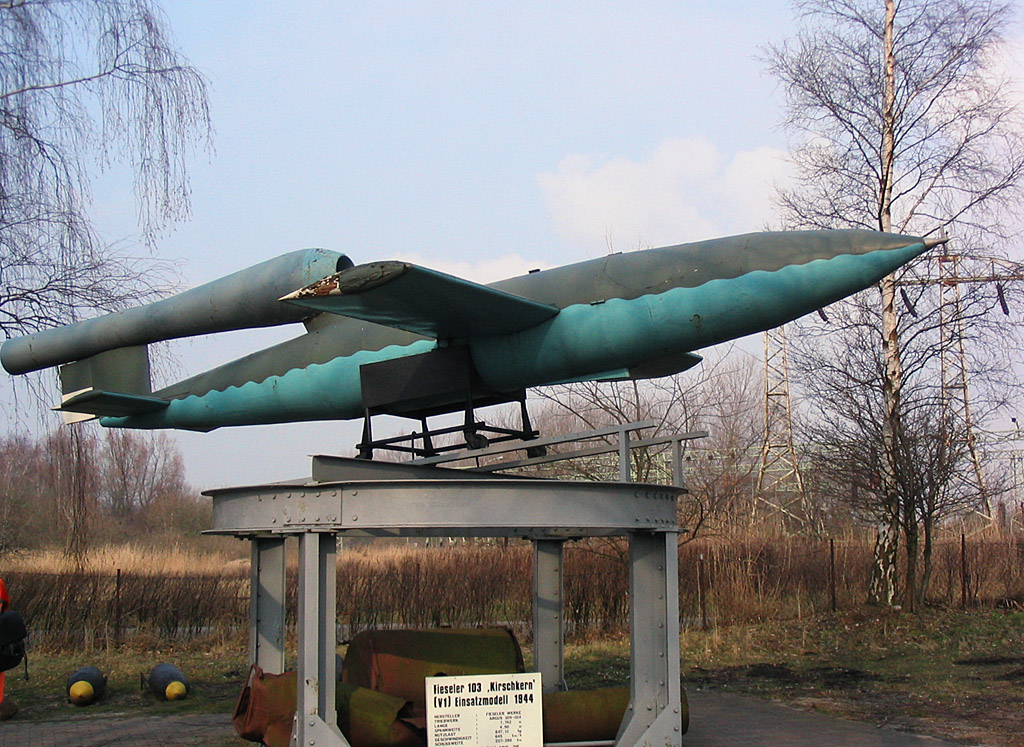
The V-1 flying bomb

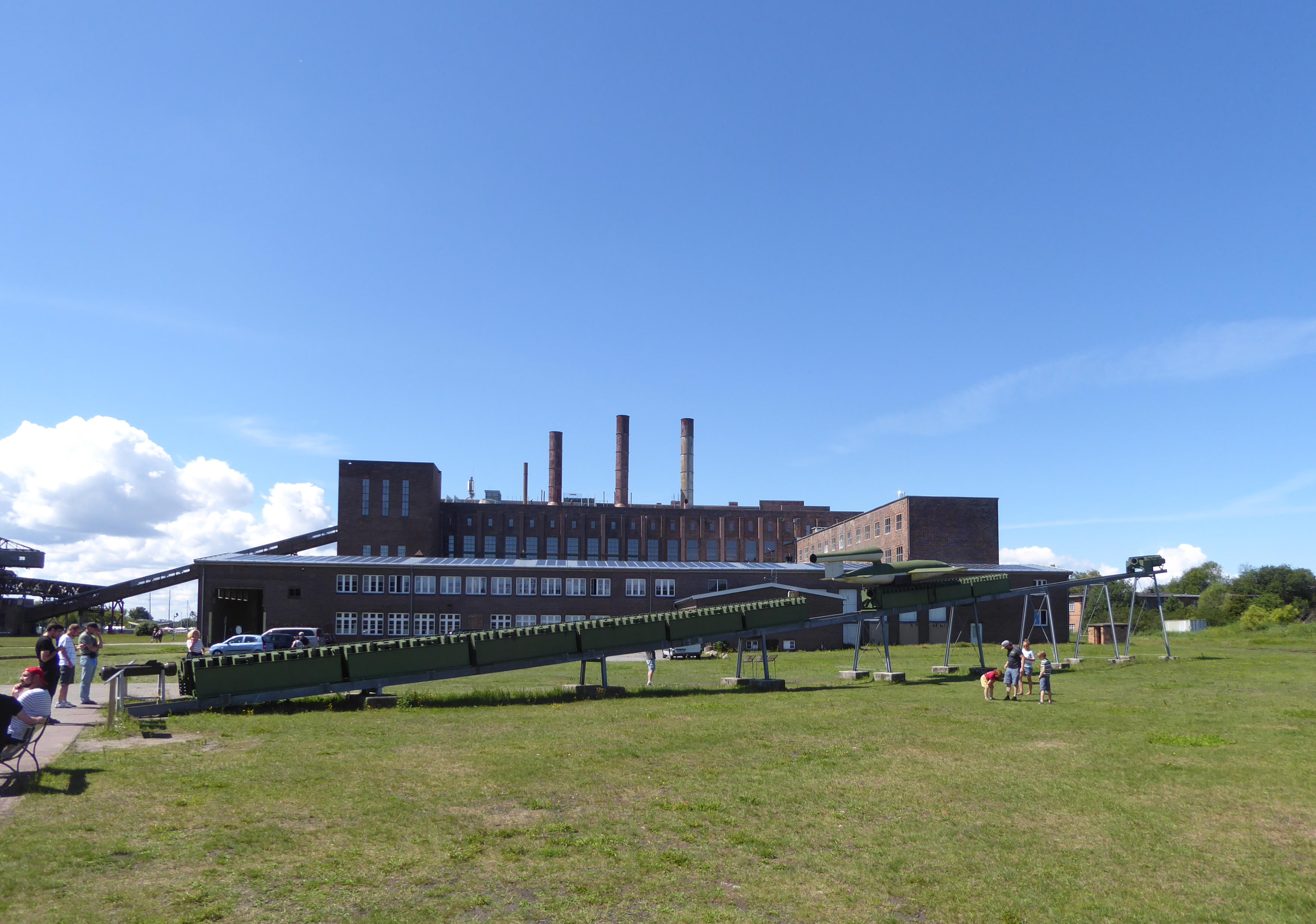
V1 rocket on launch ramp with power station behind, Peenemünde 23 07 2020

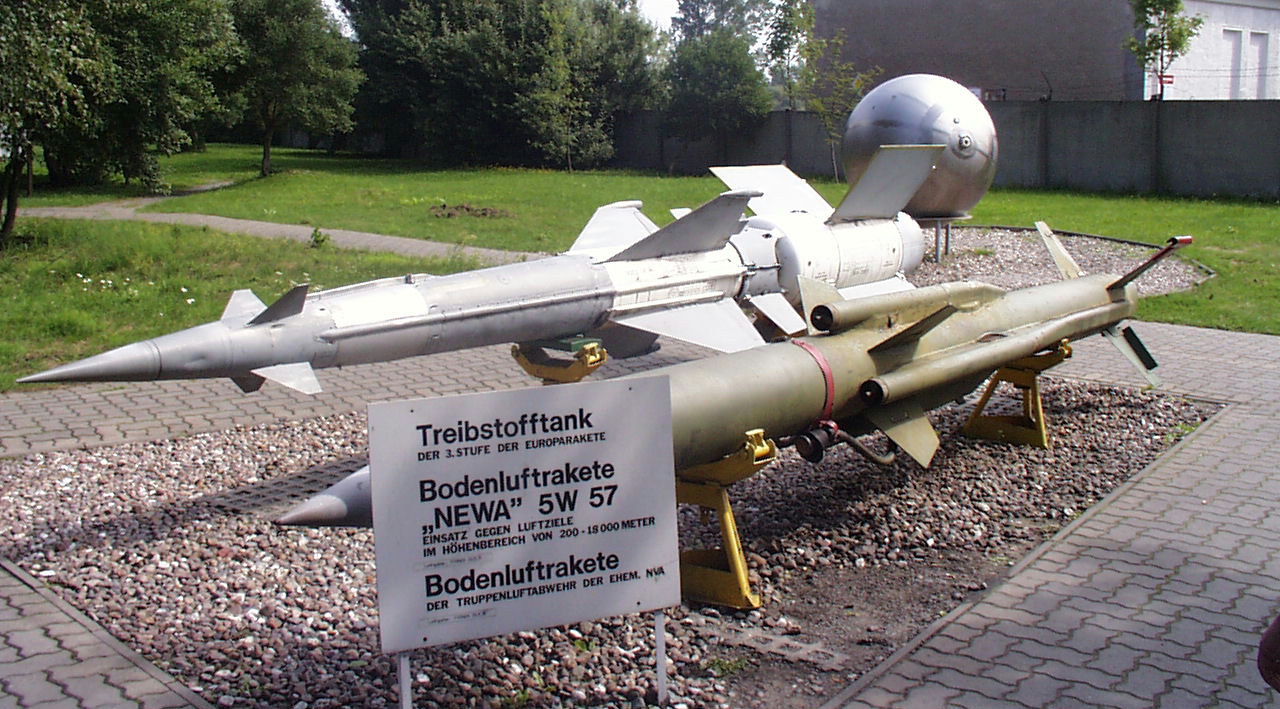
Anti-aircraft missiles

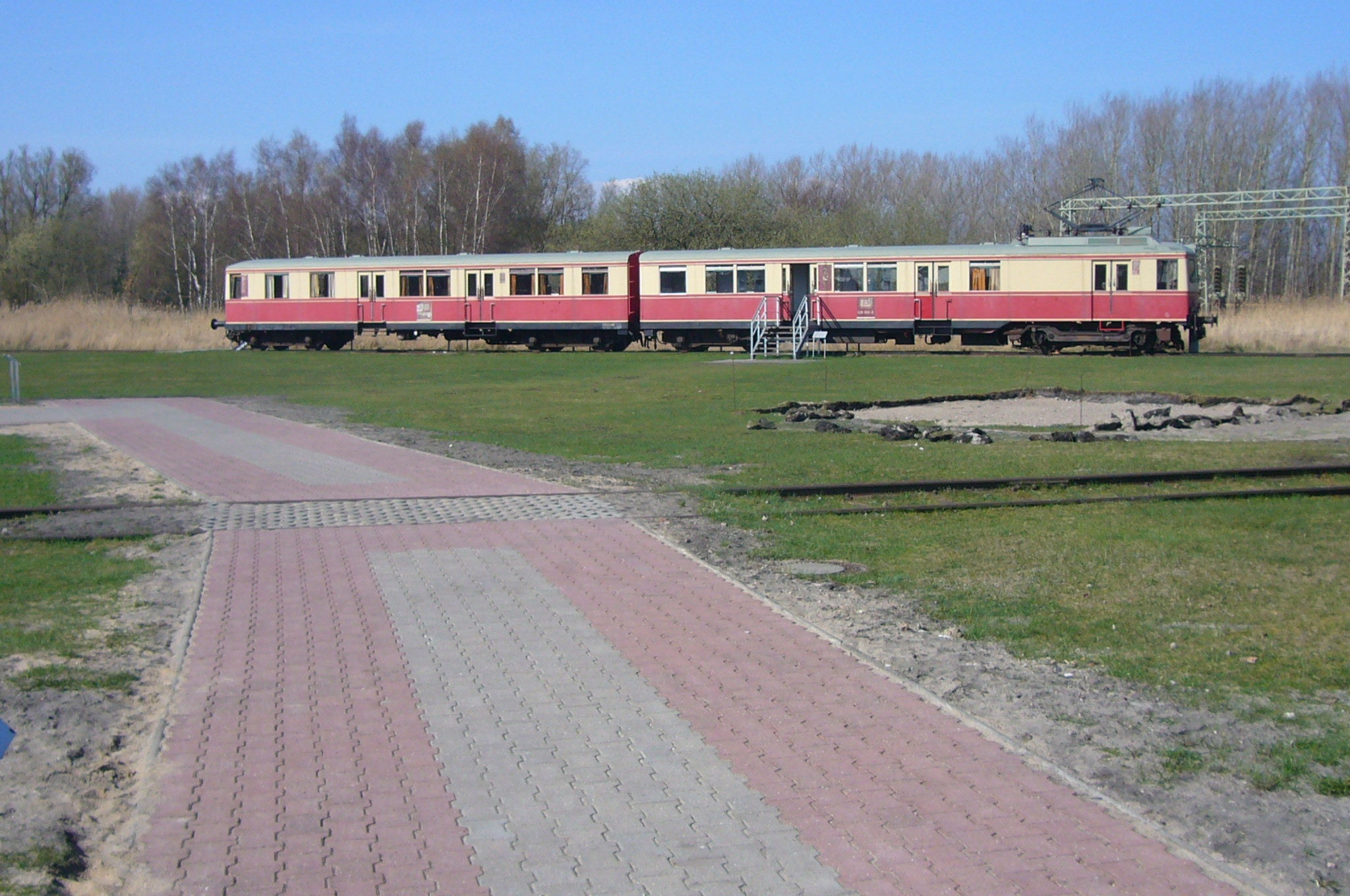
Former Peenemünde railbus in the open air site

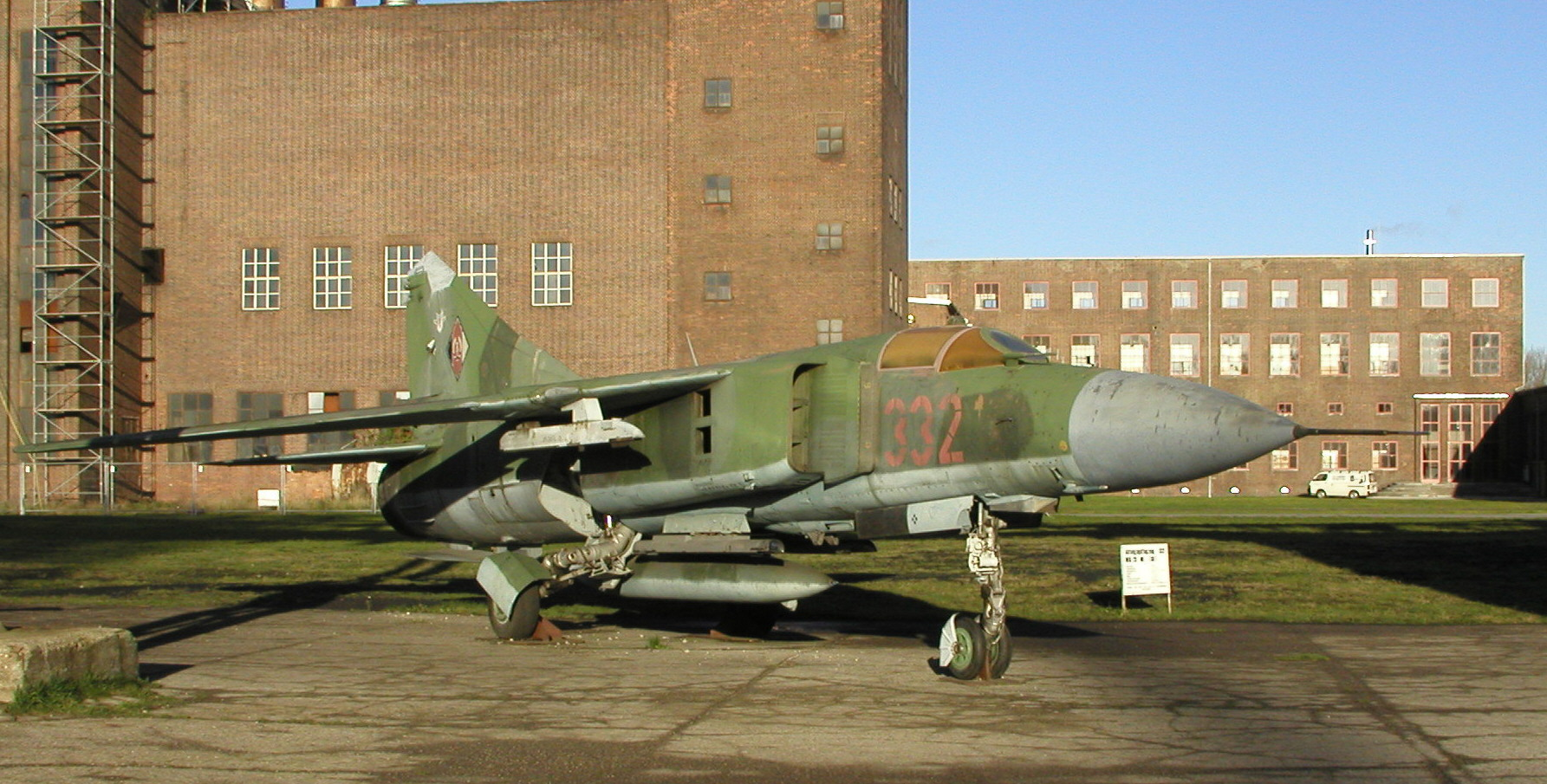
MiG-23ML of JG-9 squadron, displayed since 30 April 2010 at the Rechline Aerotechnology Museum.

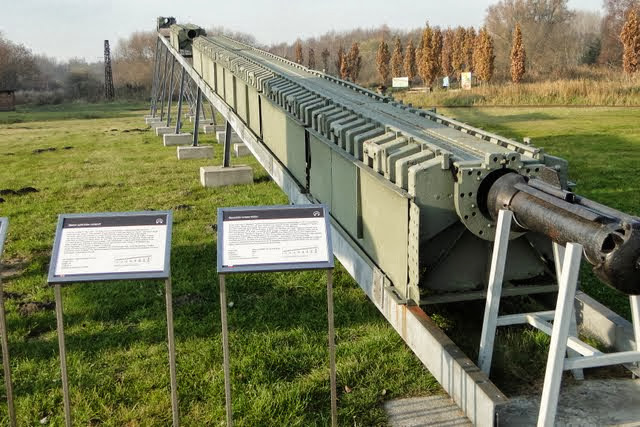
Launching pad for V1

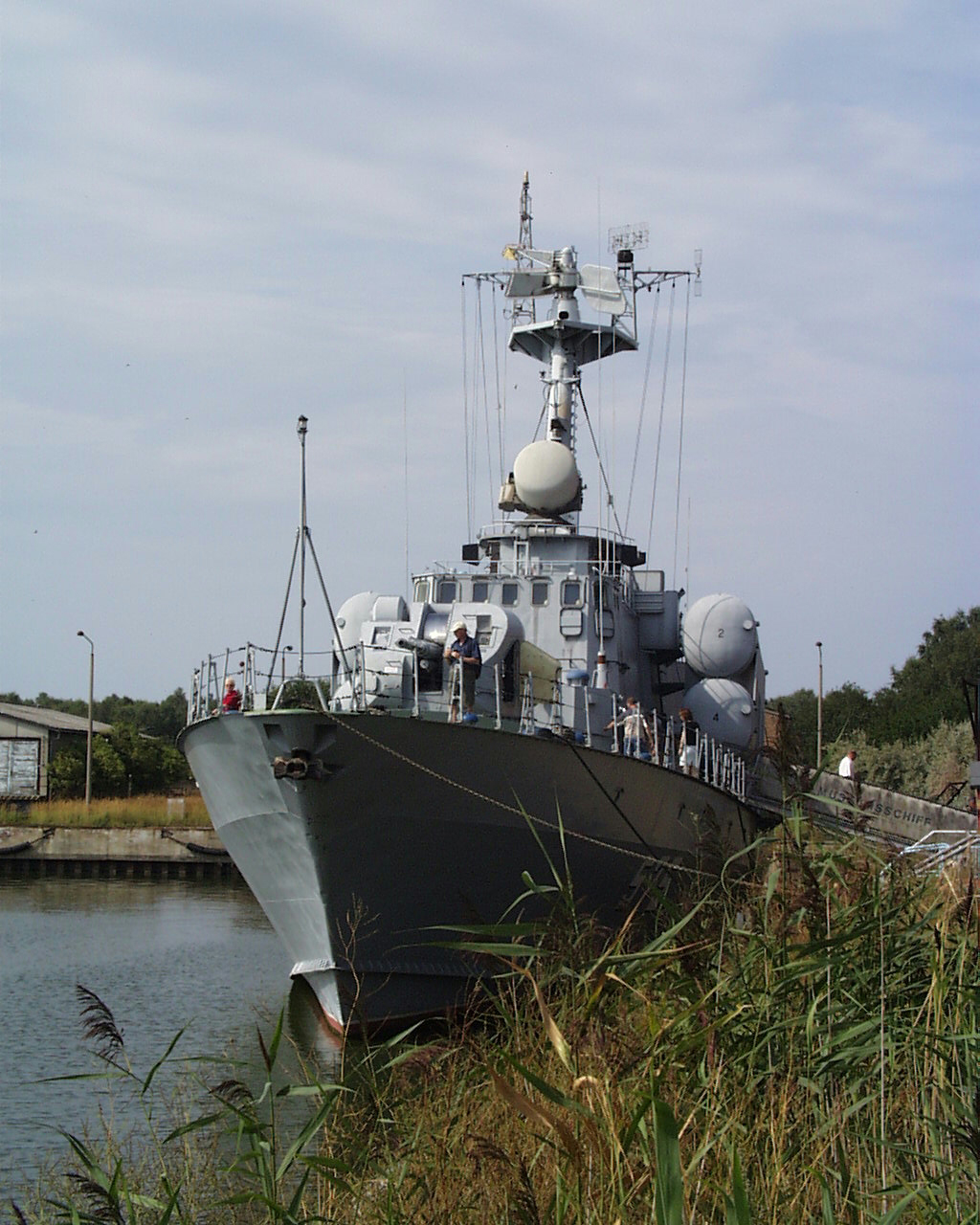
The Hans Beimler, a former Soviet-built, missile corvette of the Tarantul class operated by the Volksmarine

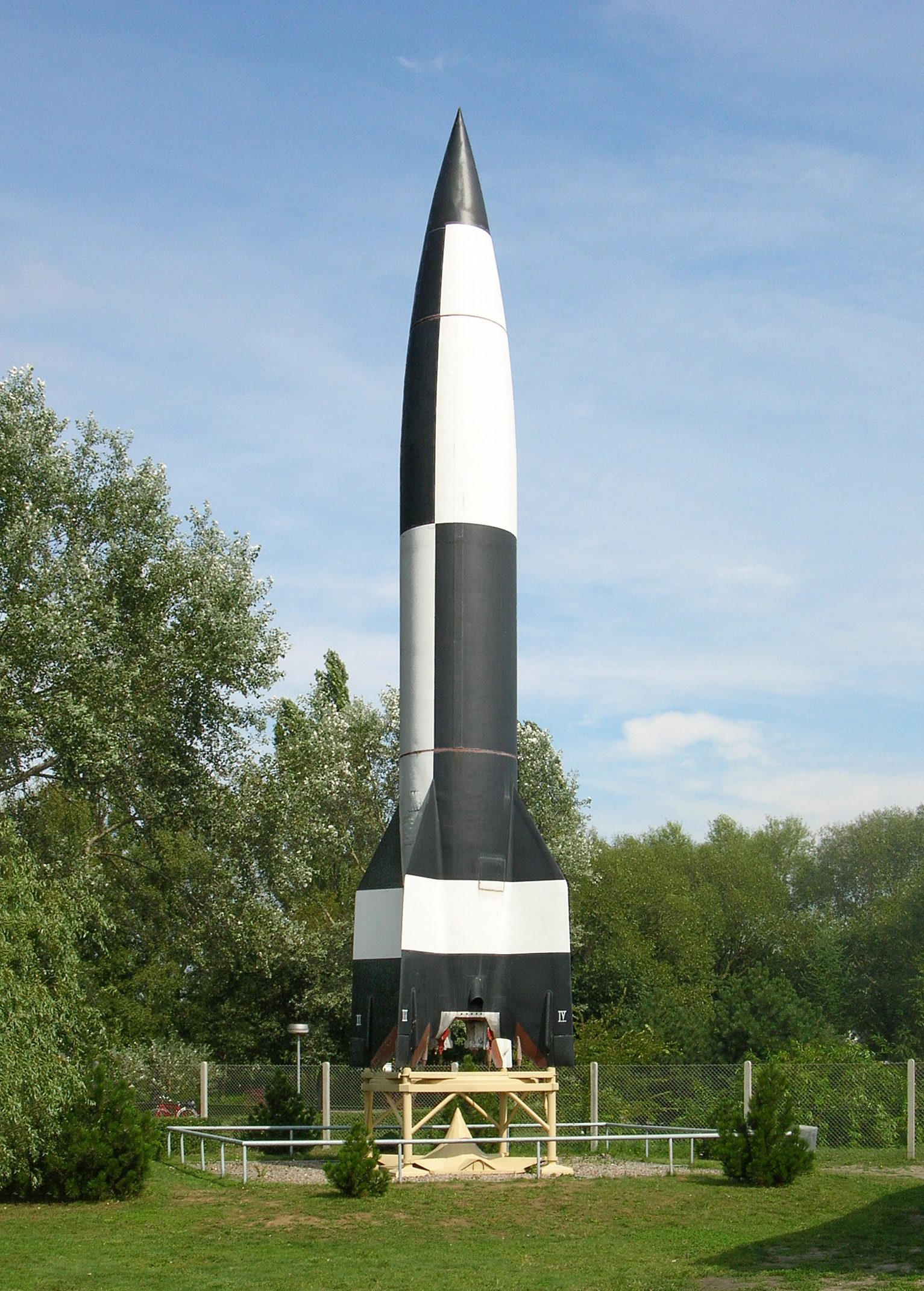
V-2 rocket replica

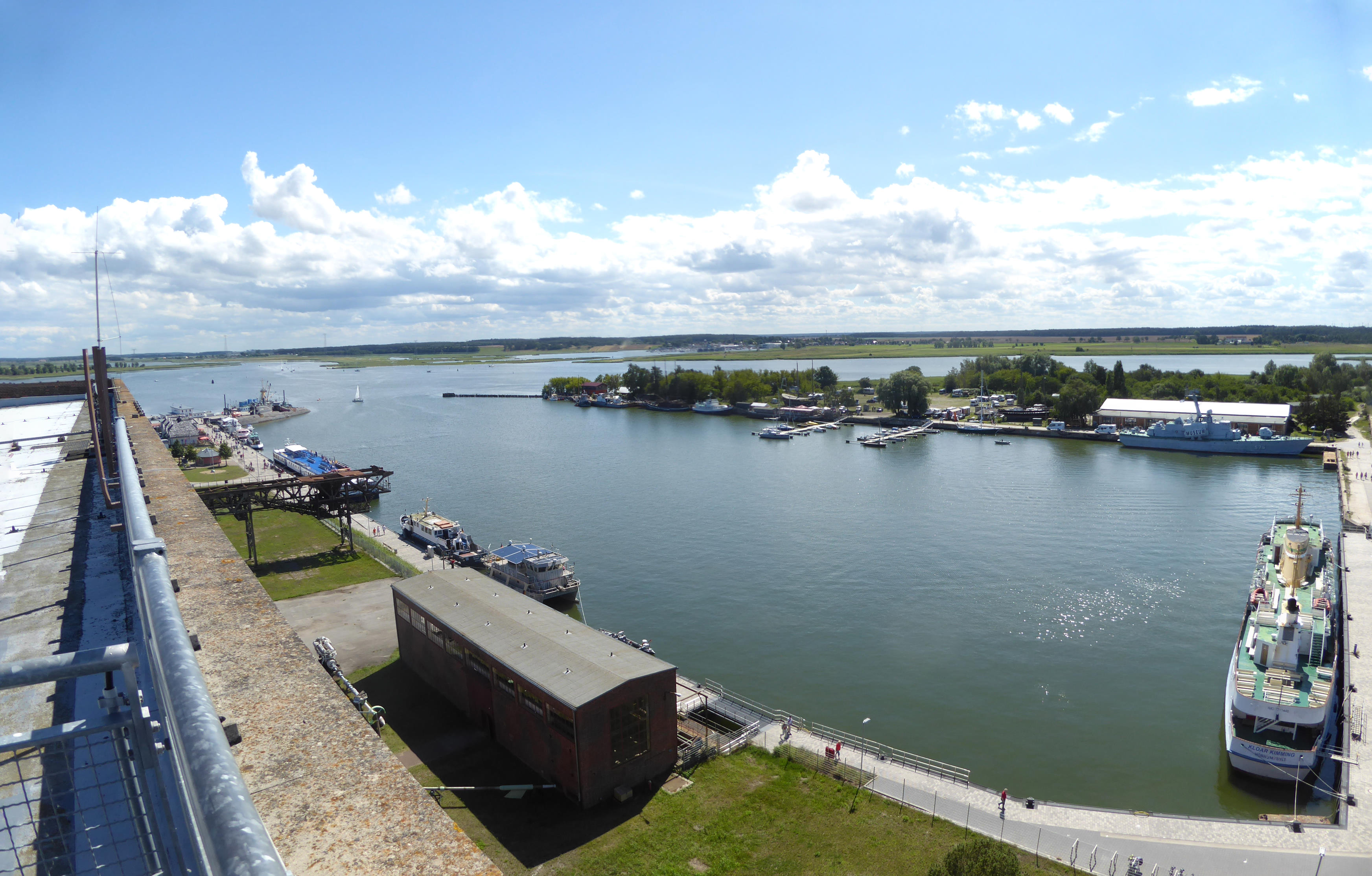
Peenemünde harbour (for importing coal) from roof of power station, on 23 07 2020

== Information boards on the Peenemünder Haken ==
There is a large number of information boards at historic locations, connected with the Army Research Centre and Luftwaffe test site, spread over the whole Peenemünder Haken ("Peenemünde Hook") and managed by the HTI. The sites include Oxygen Factory II (Sauerstoffwerk II), two former forced labour camps and a halt on the old Peenemünde industrial railway. The displayed objects and terrain are generally freely accessible and often inconspicuous. Several were laid out with the help of youth volunteers.

== See also ==
- Test Stand VII, the principal V-2 launch test facility
