= Walter Dornberger =

German Army artillery officer

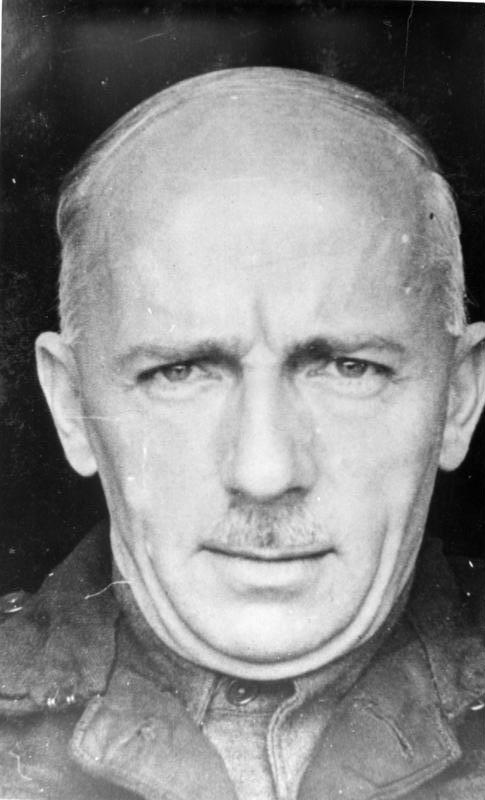
- Portrait of Major General Walter Dornberger taken during captivity, 1945
- Born: 6 September 1895; Gießen, German Empire
- Died: 26 June 1980 (aged 84); Obersasbach, West Germany
- Engineering career
- Institutions: Peenemünde Army Research Centre
- Projects: V-1 flying bomb V-2 rocket
- Military career
- Allegiance: German Empire; Weimar Republic; Nazi Germany
- Branch: Imperial German Army; Reichsheer; German Army
- Service years: 1914–1945
- Rank: Generalmajor
- Conflicts: World War I World War II

Major-General Dr. Walter Robert Dornberger (6 September 1895 – 26 June 1980) was a German Army artillery officer whose career spanned World War I and World War II. He was a leader of Nazi Germany's V-2 rocket programme and other projects at the Peenemünde Army Research Centre. After the war, the US Nazi scientist recruitment programme Operation Paperclip saw him move to the US, largely avoiding punishment for involvement in war crimes, to work for some decades in high positions in aerospace, including for Bell Aircraft and Boeing.

== Early life ==
Dornberger was born in Gießen in 1895. In 1914 he enlisted in the German army during World War 1. In October 1918, as an artillery lieutenant, Dornberger was captured by United States Marines and spent two years in a French prisoner of war camp, mostly in solitary confinement because of repeated escape attempts. In the late 1920s, Dornberger completed an engineering course with distinction at the Berlin Technical Institute, and in the spring of 1930, Dornberger graduated after five years with an MS degree in mechanical engineering from the Technische Hochschule Charlottenburg in Berlin. In 1935, Dornberger received an honorary doctorate, which Col. Karl Emil Becker arranged as Dean of the new Faculty of Military Technology at the TH Berlin.

== Rocket development ==
In April 1930, Dornberger was appointed to the Ballistics Council of the German Army (Reichswehr) Weapons Department as Assistant Examiner under Klaus von Duffenberg to secretly develop a military liquid-fuel rocket suitable for mass-production that would surpass the range of artillery. In the spring of 1932, Dornberger, his commander (Captain Ritter von Horstig), and Col. Karl Emil Becker visited the Verein für Raumschiffahrt (VfR)'s leased Raketenflugplatz (English: "Rocket Flight Field") and subsequently issued a contract for a demonstration launch. On 21 December 1932, Captain Dornberger watched a rocket motor explode at Kummersdorf while Wernher von Braun tried to light it with a flaming gasoline can at the end of a four-meter-long (13 ft) pole.

In 1933, Waffenamt Prüfwesen (Wa Prüf, English: "Weapons Testing") 1/1, under the Heereswaffenamt (Army Weapons Department), commenced work under the direction of Colonel Ing. h. c. Dornberger. Dornberger also took over his last military command on 1 October 1934, a powder-rocket training battery at Königsbrück. In May 1937, Dornberger and his ninety-man organization were transferred from Kummersdorf to Peenemünde. In September 1942, Dornberger was given two posts: coordinating the V-1 flying bomb and V-2 rocket development programs and directing active operations. The first successful test launch of a V-2 was the third test launch on 3 October 1942.

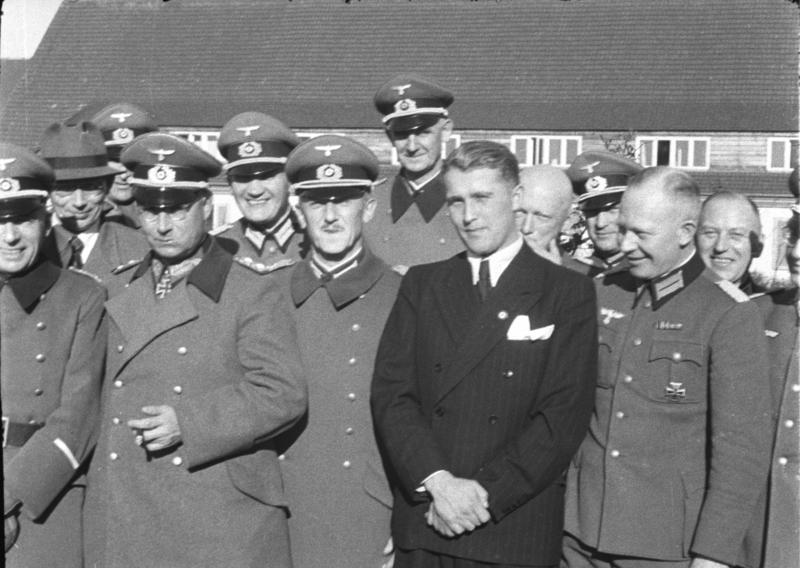
Dornberger (left) with Wernher von Braun (in civilian clothes) in Peenemünde, February 1941

In June 1943, in a speech to nearly 6,500 German employees and soldiers in Peenemünde, Dornberger blended traditional German patriotism with Nazi ideological themes while emphasizing the importance of missile development to the German war effort. The speech also referenced fears of the Soviet Union and resentment toward Allied bombing campaigns, reflecting themes commonly used in Nazi propaganda.

In the early morning of 7 July 1943, Ernst Steinhoff flew von Braun and Major-General Dornberger in his Heinkel He 111 to Hitler's Führerhauptquartier "Wolfsschanze" headquarters and the next day Hitler viewed the film of the successful V-2 test launch (narrated by von Braun) and the scale models of the Watten bunker and launching-troop vehicles:

This third day of October, 1942, is the first of a new era in transportation, that of space travel ...

— Walter Dornberger, speech at Peenemünde 3 October 1942

I have had to apologize only to two men in my whole life. The first was Field Marshal von Brauchitsch. I did not listen to him when he told me again and again how important your research was. The second man is yourself. I never believed that your work would be successful.

— Adolf Hitler, Apology to Major-General Dornberger, 8 July 1944

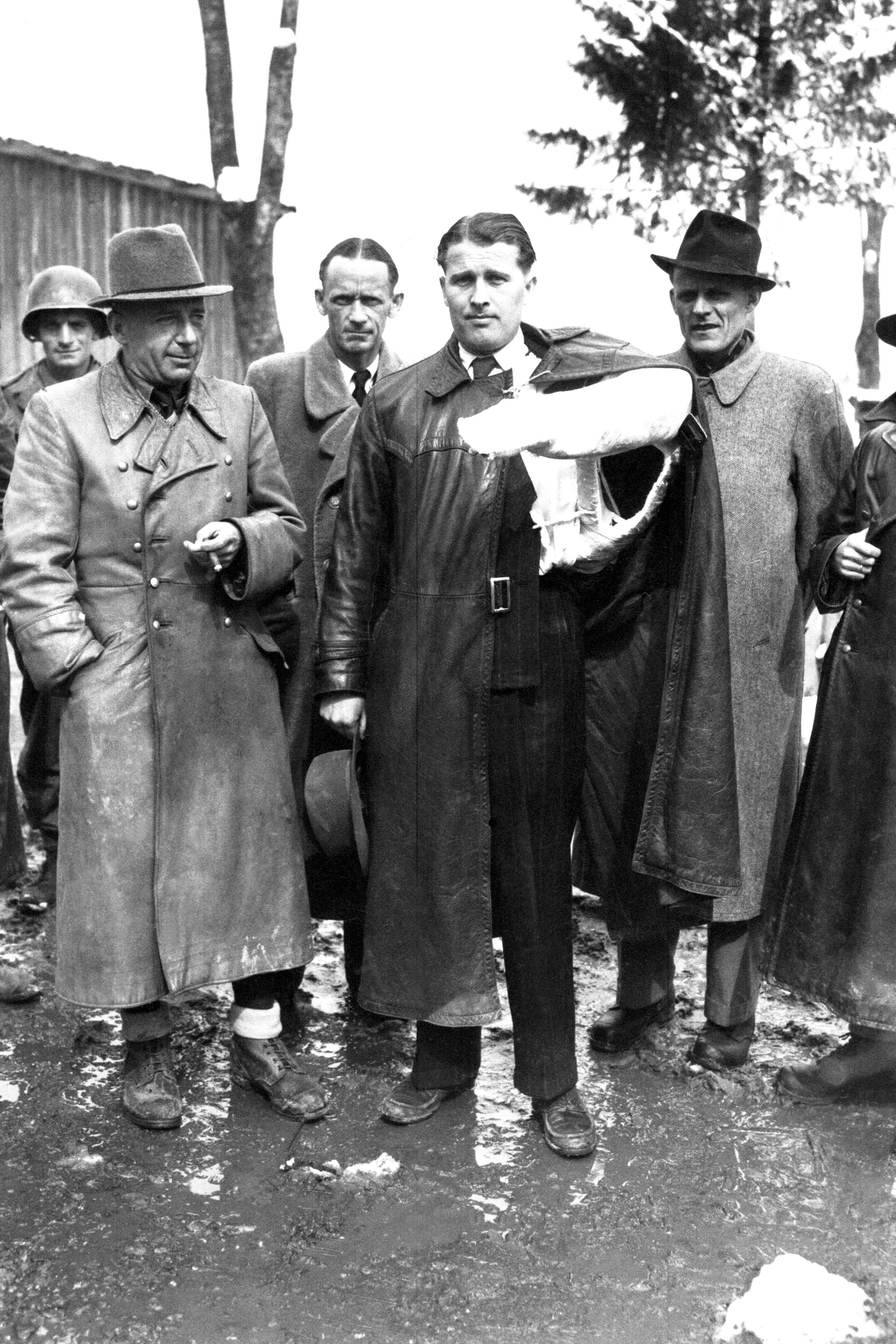
Dornberger (on the left, with hat) together with von Braun, after their surrender to Allies in Austria, May 1945

In January 1944, Dornberger was named Senior Artillery Commander 191 and was headquartered at Maisons-Lafitte near Saint Germain, and in December 1944, Dornberger was given complete authority for anti-aircraft rocket development (Flak E Flugabwehrkanonenentwicklung). On 12 January 1945 on Dornberger's proposal, Albert Speer replaced the Long-Range Weapons Commission with "Working Staff Dornberger". In February 1945, Dornberger and staff relocated his headquarters from Schwedt-an-der-Oder to Bad Sachsa, then on 6 April 1945, from Bad Sachsa to Haus Ingeborg in Oberjoch near Hindelang in the Allgäu mountains of Bavaria. Before going to the Alps, General Dornberger hid comprehensive V-2 documentation in a mine near Goslar, which were recovered by the US 332nd Engineer Regiment on 16 May 1945 by a secret action when Goslar was already occupied by the British Army.

On 2 May 1945, Dornberger, von Braun, and five other men departed from Haus Ingeborg and travelled through Gaicht Pass and towards the little Austrian village of Schattwald. They met American soldiers who convoyed the group to the Tyrolean town of Reutte for the night. At an internment camp after the war, known as "CSDIC Camp 11", the British bugged Dornberger, who in conversation with Generalmajor Gerhard Bassenge (GOC Air Defences, Tunis & Biserta) said that he and Wernher von Braun had realized in late 1944 that things were going wrong and had consequently communicated with the General Electric Corporation through the German Embassy in Portugal, with the intent of coming to some arrangement.

== Postwar ==
In mid-August 1945, after taking part in Operation Backfire, Dornberger was escorted from Cuxhaven to London for interrogation by the British War Crimes Investigation Unit in connection with the use of slave labour in the production of V-2 rockets; he was subsequently transferred and detained for two years at Bridgend in South Wales.

Along with some other German rocket scientists, Dornberger was released and brought to the United States under the auspices of Operation Paperclip and worked for the United States Air Force for three years, developing guided missiles. From 1950 to 1965, he worked for the Bell Aircraft Corporation, where he worked on several projects, rising to the post of Vice-President. He played a major role in the creation of the North American X-15 aircraft and was a key consultant for the Boeing X-20 Dyna-Soar project. He also had a role in the creation of ideas and projects which, in the end, led to the creation of the Space Shuttle. Dornberger also developed Bell's ASM-A-2, the world's first guided nuclear air-to-surface missile developed for the Strategic Air Command. Dornberger advised West Germany on a European space program. During the 1950s he had some differences with von Braun and was instrumental in recruiting several engineers out of the Huntsville's team for US Air Force projects. These included Krafft Ehricke, who later created the Centaur rocket stage and participated in several more defence projects.

Following retirement, Dornberger went to Mexico and later returned to West Germany, where he died in 1980 in Baden-Württemberg.

== Works ==
- Dornberger, Walter (1952). V-2, der Schuss ins Weltall: Geschichte einer grossen Erfindung [V-2, the Shot into Space: History of a Great Invention] (in German). Esslingen: Bechtle Verlag. OCLC 175065526.
- Dornberger, Walter (1954). V-2. New York: Viking Press. OCLC 1223668.

== Awards and decorations ==
- Iron Cross (1914), 1st and 2nd Class (World War I)
- Knight Second Class of the House Order of the White Falcon, with Swords (World War I)
- Hesse General Honor Decoration (World War I)
- Wound Badge (1918) in Black (World War I)
- Wehrmacht Long Service Award, 4th to 1st class
- War Merit Cross, 1st and 2nd Class with Swords
- Knights Cross of the War Merit Cross with Swords (29 October 1944)

== See also ==
- Arthur Rudolph
- List of German inventors and discoverers
- Aggregat (rocket family)
- V-3 cannon
