= Vavilov =

Vavilov (Russian: Вави́лов, feminine: Vavilova) is a Russian surname. Notable people with the surname include:

- Andrey Petrovich Vavilov (b. 1961), Russian politician and businessman
- Elena Vavilova (born 1962), also known as Tracey Foley, Russian KGB sleeper agent
- Natalya Vavilova (born 1959), Russian actress
- Nikolai Vavilov (1887–1943), Russian geneticist
- Sergey Ivanovich Vavilov (1891–1951), Russian physicist
- Vladimir Sergeyevich Vavilov (born 1988), Russian footballer
- Vladimir Fyodorovich Vavilov (1925–1973), Russian guitarist and composer

== See also ==
- "Vavilov" (Cosmos: Possible Worlds), an episode of Cosmos: Possible Worlds
- Vavilov (crater)
- Canada (Minister of Citizenship and Immigration) v Vavilov, a 2019 Supreme Court of Canada case
