= Ernst Steinhoff =

German-American rocket scientist

- Born: February 11, 1908; Treysa, Regierungsbezirk Kassel, Province of Hesse-Nassau, German Empire
- Died: December 2, 1987 (aged 79); Alamogordo, New Mexico
- Education: Technische Hochschule Darmstadt
- Scientific career
- Fields: Aeronautics, Meteorology, Engineering
- Workplaces: Peenemünde Army Research Center; Fort Bliss; Holloman Air Force Base

Ernst August Wilhelm Steinhoff (February 11, 1908 – December 2, 1987) was a German-American rocket scientist and member of the "von Braun rocket group", at the Peenemünde Army Research Center (1939–1945).

Ernst Steinhoff saw National Socialist (Nazi) doctrines as "ideals" and became a member of the NSDAP in May 1937. He was a glider pilot, holding distance records, and had the honorary Luftwaffe rank of "Flight Captain".

== Life ==
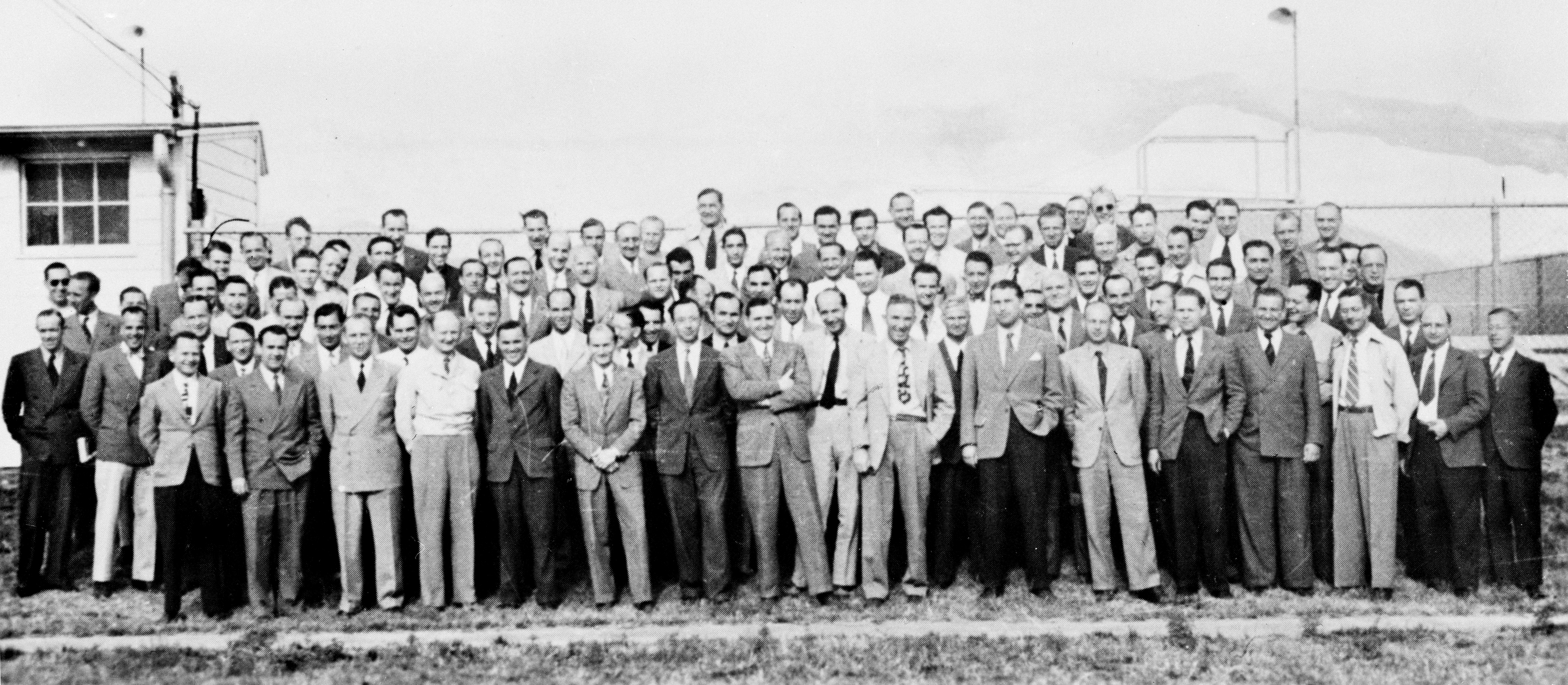
Operation Paperclip Team at Fort Bliss, Texas, August 1946. Ernst Steinhoff is in the first row. (pointing the mouse will show the name)

Ernst Steinhoff was born in 1908 in Treysa, Germany. After graduating Gymnasium with Abitur in Kassel, in 1929, he enrolled in the Darmstadt Institute of Technology in Darmstadt. During his studies, he became a member of the Burschenschaft Markomannia Darmstadt (later Burschenschaft Rheno-Markomannia Darmstadt) in 1929. He received three degrees there: a Bachelor of Science degree in Aeronautics in 1931, a Master of Science in Meteorology in 1933 and in 1940 his PhD (Dr.-Ing.) at the Technische Hochschule Darmstadt (today Technische Universität Darmstadt) with a dissertation on aviation instruments.

His younger brother Friedrich Steinhoff assisted rocket experiments while commanding U-511 in 1942. Ernst was among the scientists to surrender and travel to the United States to provide rocketry expertise via Operation Paperclip. Friedrich was captured aboard U-873 and committed suicide in a Boston jail before Ernst came to the United States on the first boat, November 16, 1945. with Operation Paperclip and Fort Bliss, Texas (1945–1949). He then moved to Holloman Air Force Base where he also worked closely with White Sands Missile Range in New Mexico. He focused on guidance, control, and range instrumentation throughout his career. He was awarded the Decoration for Exceptional Civilian Service in 1958 for his contributions to the US rocket program. In 1979 he was inducted into the New Mexico International Space Hall of Fame.

Steinhoff is being credited as one of the first pioneers to popularize the concept of space resource utilization for Mars exploration. He became the first chairman of Working Group on Extraterrestrial Resources (WGER).

As of 1981, Mrs. Dixie Cantwell of Alamogordo, NM, was working on researching and writing the biography of "Alamogordo's well-known scientist, Dr. Ernest A Steinhoff". The status of said biography, and its progress remains unknown.

His daughter Monika Steinhoff is a painter in Santa Fe, New Mexico, and a children's park on Holloman AFB is named after him.
