= Vladimir Vavilov (footballer) =

Russian footballer

Personal information
- Full name: Vladimir Sergeyevich Vavilov
- Date of birth: 4 August 1988 (age 38)
- Height: 1.74 m (5 ft 8 1/2 in)
- Positions: Midfielder; forward

Senior career*
Years	Team	Apps	(Gls)
2005	FC Khimki-2		
2006–2009	FC Khimki	1	(0)
2009	→ FC Lokomotiv-2 Moscow (loan)	21	(4)
2010	FC Lokomotiv-2 Moscow	24	(2)
2011–2012	FC Istra	21	(2)
- * Club domestic league appearances and goals

Vladimir Sergeyevich Vavilov (Russian: Владимир Серге́евич Вавилов; born 4 August 1988) is a former Russian professional football player.

== Club career ==
He played in the Russian Football National League for FC Khimki in 2006.
