= Khua =

Khua or KHUA may refer to:

- Khua, a variety of the Mon–Khmer Bru language of Southeast Asia
- Khoa, a dairy product of South Asia
- KHUA, the ICAO code for Redstone Army Airfield, a military airport in Alabama, US

== See also ==
- Kuha (disambiguation)
