= Heinz Hilten =

German-American architect and Operation Paperclip hire

- Born: April 29, 1909; Berlin, Germany
- Died: March 1, 2013 (aged 103); Huntsville, Alabama, U.S.
- Occupation: Architect
- Spouse: Kaete Hilten
- Children: 3
- Buildings: Propulsion and Structural Test Facility, Rosenaustadion, Saturn V Dynamic Test Stand
- Projects: Point Mallard Park, Von Braun Center concert hall

Heinz Hilten (April 29, 1909 – March 3, 2013) was a German-American architect and member of the "von Braun rocket team." He was a later Operation Paperclip hire and was involved in the design of numerous buildings in Space Age-era Huntsville, Alabama, both for NASA and for general use.

== Biography ==
Hilten was born in Berlin on April 29, 1909. Towards the beginning of World War II, he was drafted into the German Army, which eventually assigned him to the Peenemünde Army Research Center. Hilten worked there from June 1944 to April 1945 as part of Wernher von Braun's team, designing buildings for the V-2 rocket program.

After the end of World War II, Hilten did not immediately move to the U.S. with Operation Paperclip, instead remaining in Germany to aid in post-war reconstruction. Hilten served as Architect and Planner for Augsburg until 1954; his notable design projects in this capacity included the Frauenfachschule, a women's trade school, and the Rosenaustadion, a sports stadium built from the rubble of aerial bombings during the war. Hilten reportedly considered the Rosenaustadion his greatest design achievement.

In 1954, Hilten traveled to Huntsville to rejoin von Braun and his team. Hilten was named Architect and Master Planner for Redstone Arsenal, where he designed buildings to accommodate the facility's rapid expansion. In 1960 he moved to the newly created Marshall Space Flight Center, taking up the same title. Hilten's designs at the MSFC included numerous test stands and launch facilities for NASA's rocket program, including the Propulsion and Structural Test Facility and the Saturn V Dynamic Test Stand. "I always said that I was not a space scientist that designed the rockets, but that I designed the space those scientists worked with," Hilten is quoted on this era of his career. He continued to work at the MSFC until his retirement in 1978.

Outside of Hilten's aerospace architecture, he also designed or was involved in the design of many buildings and projects, public and private, in the Huntsville area. Among others, he worked on Huntsville's Memorial Parkway, Point Mallard Park, and the Von Braun Center concert hall; Hilten played at the latter location with the Huntsville Symphony Orchestra during its first full season. He also did architectural work for the private homes of several other Operation Paperclip hires, including swimming pool designs for Wernher von Braun and Ernst Stuhlinger.
