= Redstone Test Stand =

- U.S. National Register of Historic Places
- U.S. National Historic Landmark
- Alabama Historic Civil Engineering Landmark
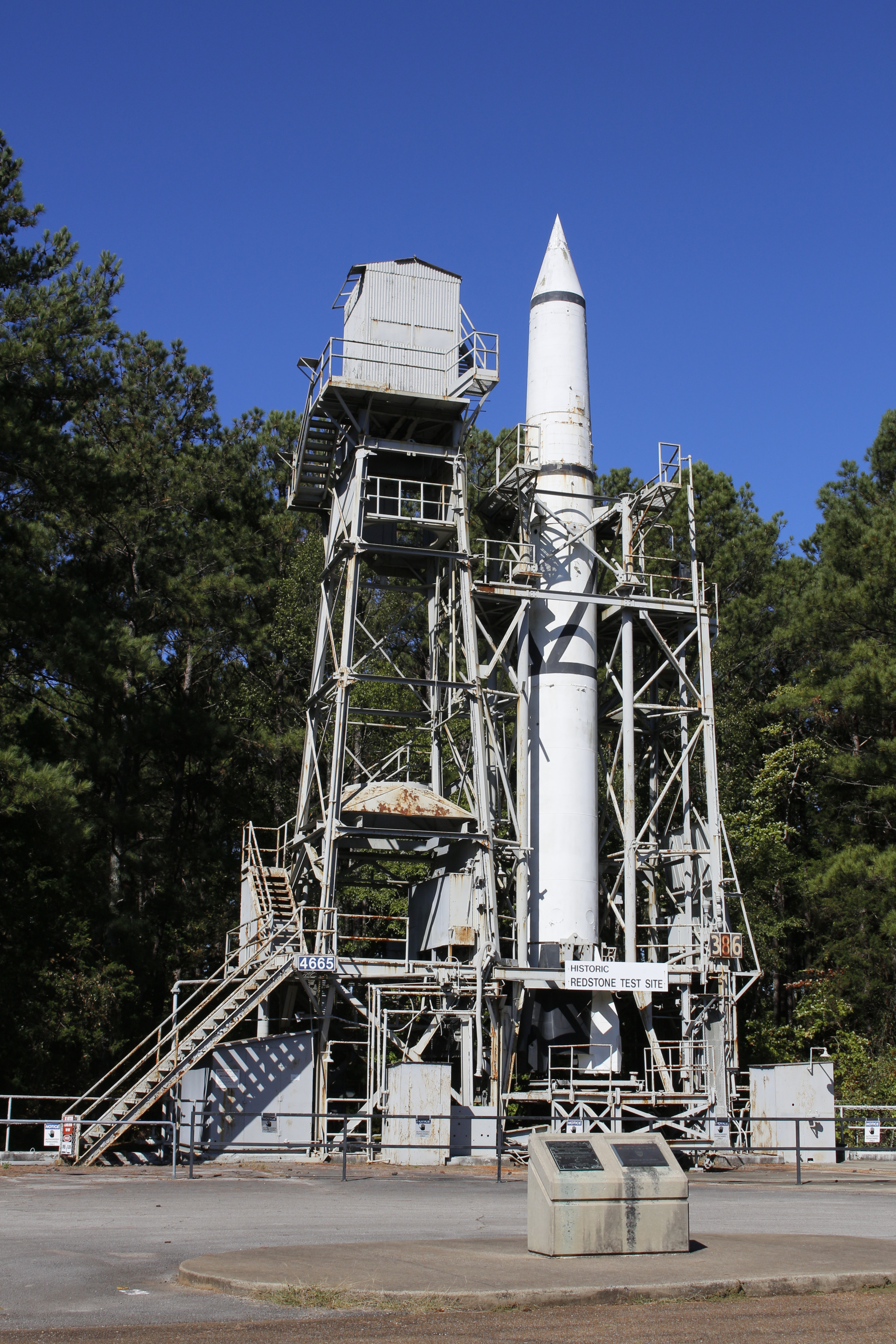
- Redstone Test Stand at the MSFC in Huntsville, AL. Cold Calibration Unit (left) PGM-11 Redstone missile in static test stand (right)

- Location within Huntsville, Alabama Location within Alabama Location within the United States
- Nearest city: Huntsville, Alabama
- Coordinates: 34°37′58.7676″N 86°39′58.1436″W
- Built: 1953; 73 years ago
- Architect: U.S. Army
- NRHP reference No.: 76000341

Significant dates
- Added to NRHP: May 13, 1976
- Designated NHL: October 3, 1985
- Designated AHCEL: 1979

The Redstone Test Stand or Interim Test Stand was used to develop and test fire the Redstone missile, Jupiter-C sounding rocket, Juno I launch vehicle and Mercury-Redstone launch vehicle. It was declared an Alabama Historic Civil Engineering Landmark in 1979 and a National Historic Landmark in 1985. It is located at NASA's George C. Marshall Space Flight Center (MSFC) in Huntsville, Alabama on the Redstone Arsenal, designated Building 4665. The Redstone missile was the first missile to carry a detonated nuclear weapon. Jupiter-C launched to test components for the Jupiter missile. Juno I put the first American satellite Explorer 1 into orbit. Mercury Redstone carried the first American astronaut Alan Shepard into space. The Redstone earned the name "Old Reliable" because of this facility and the improvements it made possible.

The Interim Test Stand was built in 1953 by Dr. Wernher von Braun's team for a mere US$25,000 (equivalent to $300,840 in 2025) out of materials salvaged from the Redstone Arsenal. In 1957 the permanent test facility called the Static Test Tower was finally finished, but the Army decided to continue operations at the Interim Test Stand rather than move. From 1953 to 1961, 362 static rocket tests were conducted there, including 200 that led directly to improvements in the Redstone rocket for the Mercury crewed flight program. Adapted over the years, it never experienced the growth in size and cost that typified test stands in general, remaining a testament to the engineering ingenuity of the rocket pioneers.

== Background ==
Liquid-propellant rocket development has always proceeded in three steps:

1. Engine testing
2. Static rocket testing
3. Test launches

First, prototype engines are tested in a Rocket engine test facility, where the most promising designs are refined during a period of extensive testing. After an engine has been proven, the complete rocket is assembled. In this second step, the rocket is anchored to a static test stand. With the rocket held down, engineers run the engine at full power and refine the system. The test launch is third, when the missile is fired into the sky. Wernher von Braun and his team used this process to develop the V-2 or A4 missile in Germany during WWII.

Von Braun and members of his team decided to surrender to the United States military to ensure they were not captured by the advancing Soviets or shot by the Nazis to prevent their capture. They came to the United States via Operation Paperclip. The Army first assigned the Germans to teach German missile technology, assist with the launching of captured V-2's, and continue rocket research as part of the Hermes project at Fort Bliss, Texas and White Sands Proving Grounds

On April 15, 1950, the Army consolidated their far-flung guided missile and rocket research and development efforts into the Ordnance Guided Missile Center (OGMC) at Redstone Arsenal. The Army bought the former WWII munitions facility from the Army Chemical Corps. That summer and fall, members of the German rocket team moved from Fort Bliss to Huntsville. They conducted a preliminary study for proposed 500-mile (800 km) range missiles and began developing one, called Hermes C-1. The study envisioned warhead payloads of 1,500 and 3,000 pounds (680 and 1,360 kg), with the first test launch in 20 months. Cold War tensions escalated by the Korean War drove the payload up to a 6,900-pound (3,100 kg) atomic bomb with a reduced range. The system with its new specifications took the name Redstone, and had to be highly reliable, accurate, and quickly produced, priority 1A. The development program for the Redstone began in earnest on May 1, 1951. Separate from the missile development program, another budget line item was to bear the cost of constructing facilities for research and development at Redstone Arsenal because those facilities could also be used for other projects. However, the construction of facilities was not funded.

== Early development, 1952–1955 ==
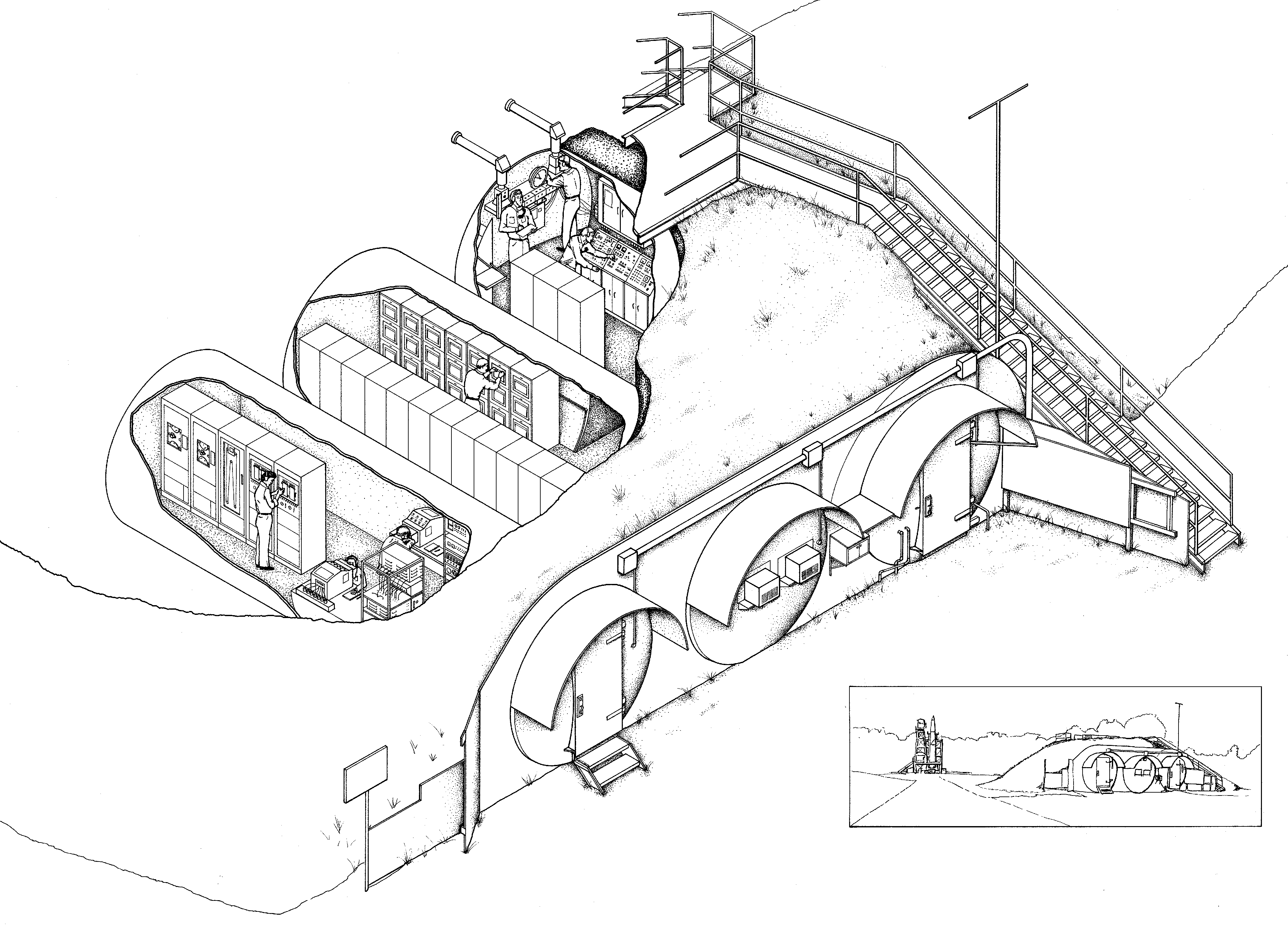
Drawings of buried railroad tanker vessels used as bunkers for instrumentation and control. Note periscopes in right tank

The first twelve missiles were built at Redstone Arsenal. Assembly of the first Redstone began in the fall of 1952. Engineers needed a propulsion test stand to improve the missile, but they were not allowed to spend research and development funds on constructing facilities even for a cause vital to national security. Rather than wait for funding to go through the two-year Congressional appropriation process, then wait further for construction, Fritz A. Vandersee designed an interim test stand for $25,000, the maximum amount allowed. The large concrete foundation cost nearly all of the money. On this base, welders built a small stand with metal salvaged from around the arsenal. Three railroad tank cars that had been used to transport chemicals at the arsenal during the war were cleaned, modified, and buried 300 feet (91 m) away to serve as control and observation bunkers. To view the firings, the tanks also contain two periscopes believed to have been from two surplus Army tanks.

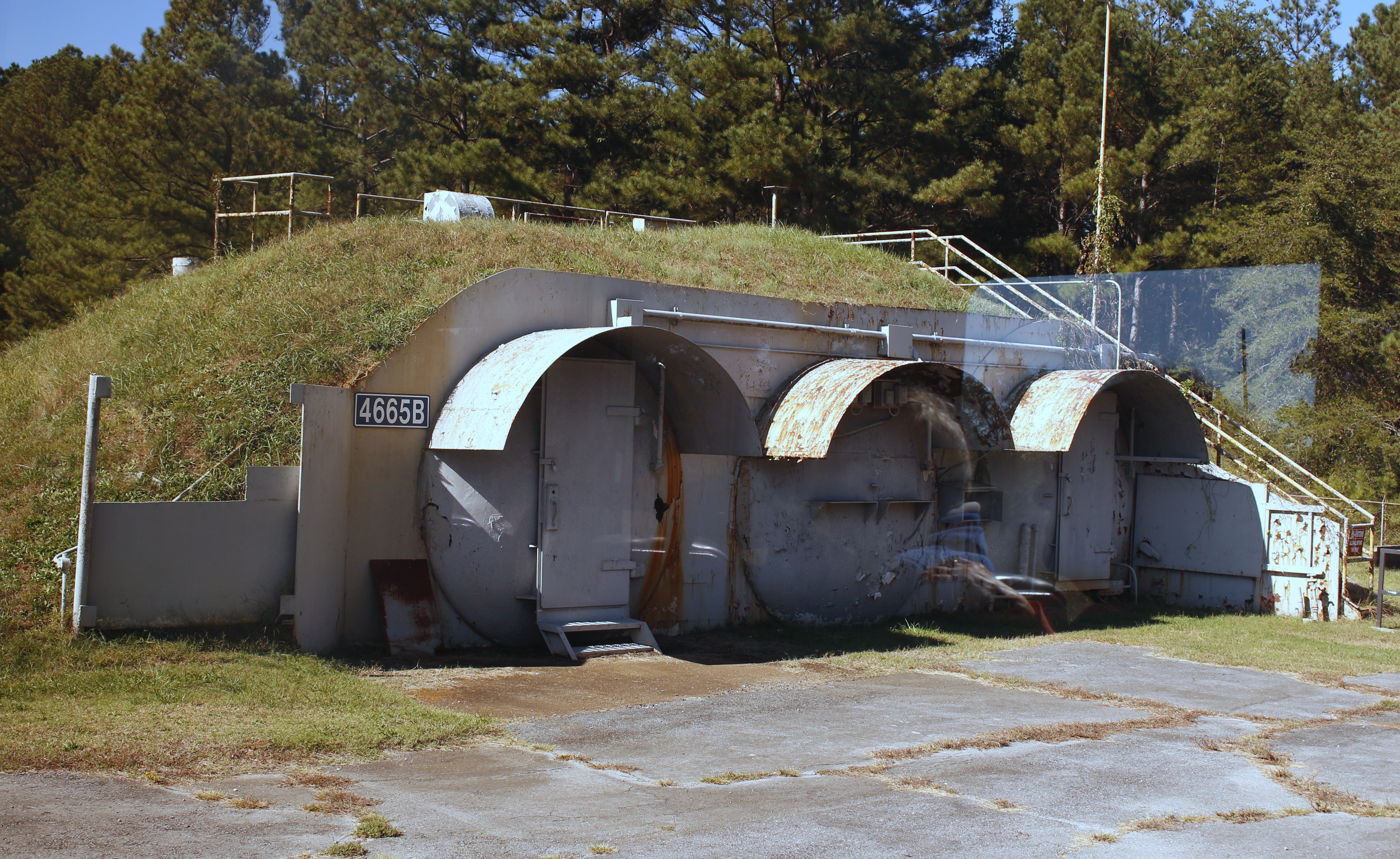
Bunker entrance in 2017

When workers assembled the first Redstone missile at Redstone Arsenal in spring of 1953, the Redstone Interim Test Stand stood ready. A crane hoisted the missile (without the warhead) onto the stand and placed a frame atop the missile. Cables were attached to the frame to steady the missile. After extensive tests, workers fueled the missile and fired the engine for tests lasting no more than 15 seconds. After several successful test runs, the missile went to Cape Canaveral Air Force Station for the test flight. Launches provided valuable information on the guidance system, but most improvements on the propulsion system came from lessons learned at the Interim Test Stand, where engineers could evaluate the internal workings of the propulsion system while it was firmly anchored to the ground. A total of fourteen tests were performed with the first four missiles.

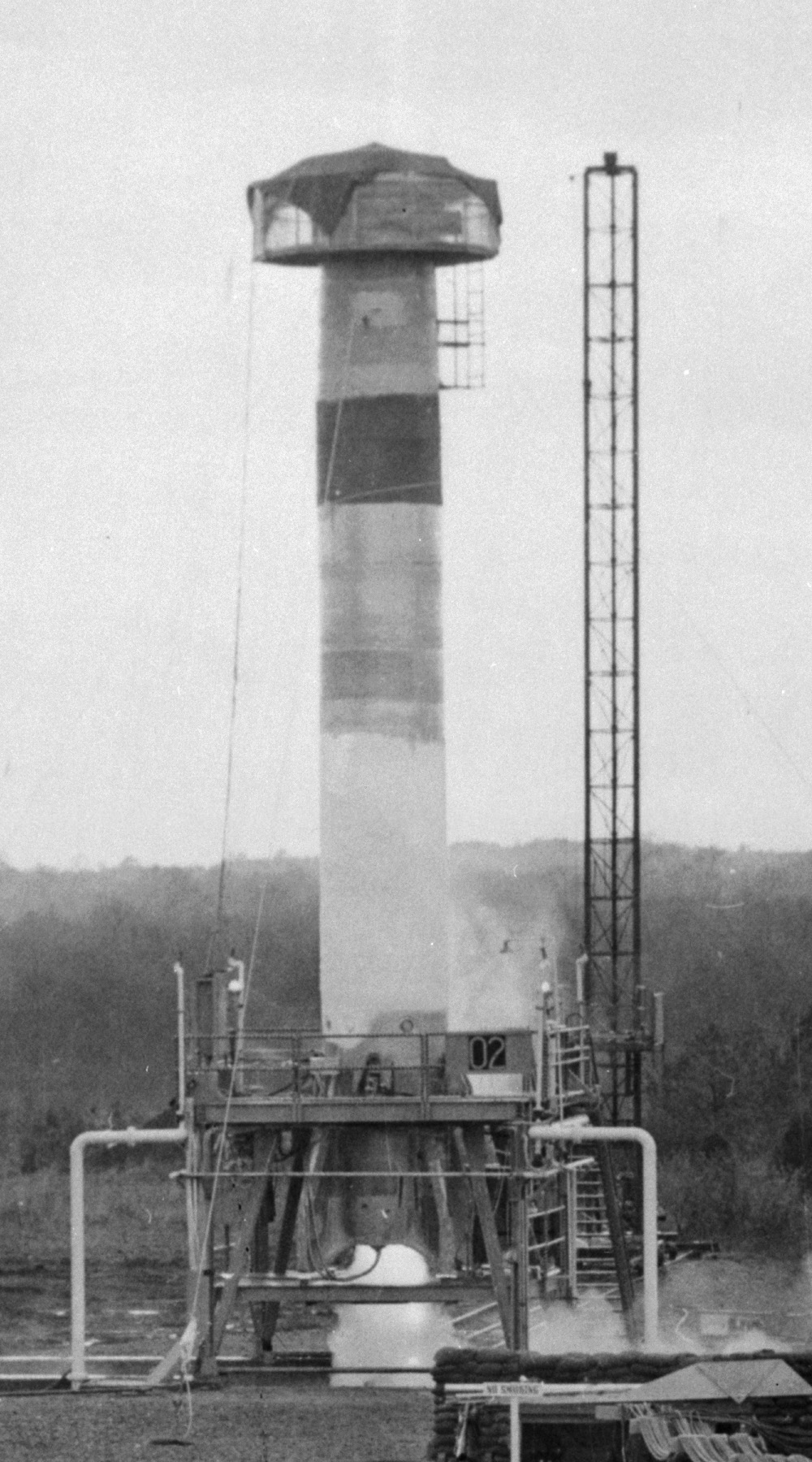
Redstone Test Stand during missile test #02

Before congressional appropriation and construction of permanent facilities was completed, the engineers used the information gained during static testing at the Interim Stand to steadily improve the Redstone system. The next eight missiles stood for twenty-two tests. The tower to the left of the missile (shown above right) is the Cold Calibration Unit, built in 1954. It held only the Redstone's alcohol and liquid oxygen tanks, pumps, valves and flow meters in various configurations. The liquids flowed into another set of tanks and were used to test and calibrate the valves and flow meters to assure that accurate measurements were made during the static fire testing and to assure a proper alcohol to oxygen mixture ratio. Oxygen-rich propellant mixtures had caused most engine explosions in the early years of liquid rocket development.

In the original version of the facility, flames were directed in a trench beneath the rocket in two opposite directions. In December 1955, workers installed a new more durable elbow-shaped flame deflector designed by Rocketdyne engineer Carl Kassner. Water injected through small holes in the elbow quickly turned to steam, keeping the flame away from the metal elbow.

== Army Ballistic Missile Agency, 1956–1958 ==
The Army Ballistic Missile Agency (ABMA) was established on February 1, 1956 to turn the experimental Redstone rocket into an operational weapon and to develop a new Jupiter Intermediate Range Ballistic Missile (IRBM). The Redstone missile development continued with routine missile qualification tests and several improvements were made to the Interim Test Stand. A load cell was added to directly measure the thrust of the missile. A cutoff system was added to detect rough combustion in the engine and automatically stop tests. This system prevented engine damage while engineers solved the problem. The first Redstone built by Chrysler was tested at the Interim Stand. Chrysler built thirty-eight developmental Redstone missiles and all sixty-three tactical Redstones in Detroit. In addition, several of the Redstone missiles were modified to aid the Jupiter missile development program. These longer missiles were called Jupiter-C and test fired on the Interim Stand after it was enlarged and strengthened. A series of tests using propellants chilled to −25 °F (−32 °C) established that the Redstone could be deployed in the Arctic.

In 1957 the permanent Propulsion and Structural Test Facility was finally completed using the funds appropriated by Congress for the Redstone, but the ABMA decided to continue using the Interim Test Stand for the Redstone. After four years of development, the interim facilities had proven adequate for testing the Redstone and Jupiter-C, and the Army felt that a move to the new facilities would be disruptive to its busy schedule.

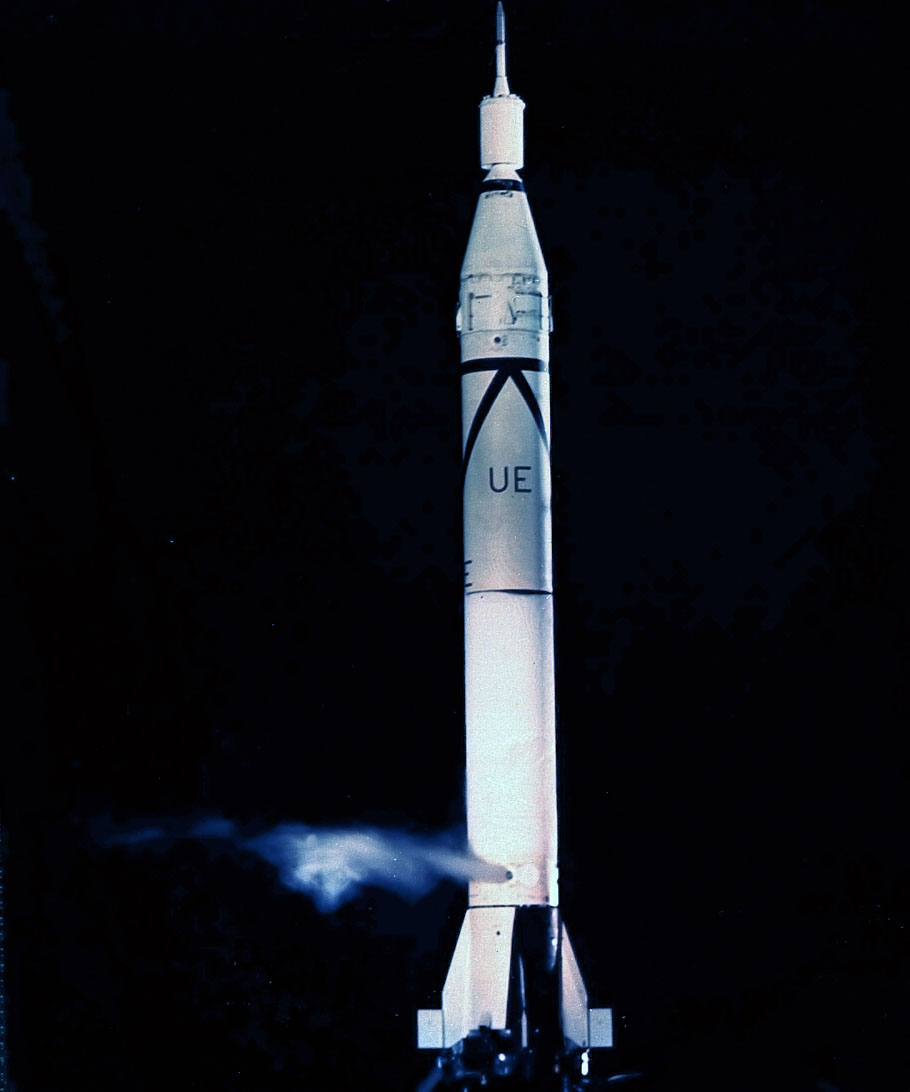
Juno I awaiting launch with Explorer I

Dr. von Braun had proposed to Project Orbiter using a Redstone as the main booster for launching artificial satellites on June 25, 1954. The day Sputnik 1 launched, October 4, 1957, von Braun had been showing incoming Defense Secretary Neil McElroy around the Redstone Arsenal. They received the news about Sputnik as they relaxed that afternoon. Von Braun turned to McElroy. "We could have been in orbit a year ago," he said. "We knew they [the Soviets] were going to do it! Vanguard will never make it. We have the hardware on the shelf… We can put up a satellite in 60 days." McElroy was not confirmed until the next week and did not have the power to back their proposal. On November 8, McElroy directed the Army to modify two Jupiter-C missiles and to place a satellite in orbit by March 1958. The first stage was soon test fired. Eighty-four days later, on January 31, 1958, the ABMA launched the first US satellite, Explorer I, into orbit. Following this successful launch, five more of these modified Jupiter-C missiles (subsequently re-designated Juno I) were launched in attempts to place additional Explorer satellites in orbit. During this satellite program, the Department of the Army gathered a great deal of knowledge about space. Explorer I gathered and transmitted data on atmospheric densities and the earth's oblateness. It is primarily remembered, though, as the discoverer of the Van Allen cosmic radiation belt.

Because of its proven reliability and accuracy, the Department of Defense decided to use the Redstone missile in tests to study the effects of nuclear detonations in the upper atmosphere, Operation Hardtack I. After being static-fired at the Interim Stand in January 1958, two missiles were shipped to the Pacific Test Range. In July and August, the missiles became the first missiles ever to detonate atomic warheads.

In 1958, Redstone development ended and Chrysler began mass production for deployment. Only a few of these missiles were tested at the Interim Test Stand because the propulsion system had become so reliable.

== Mercury-Redstone, 1959–1960 ==
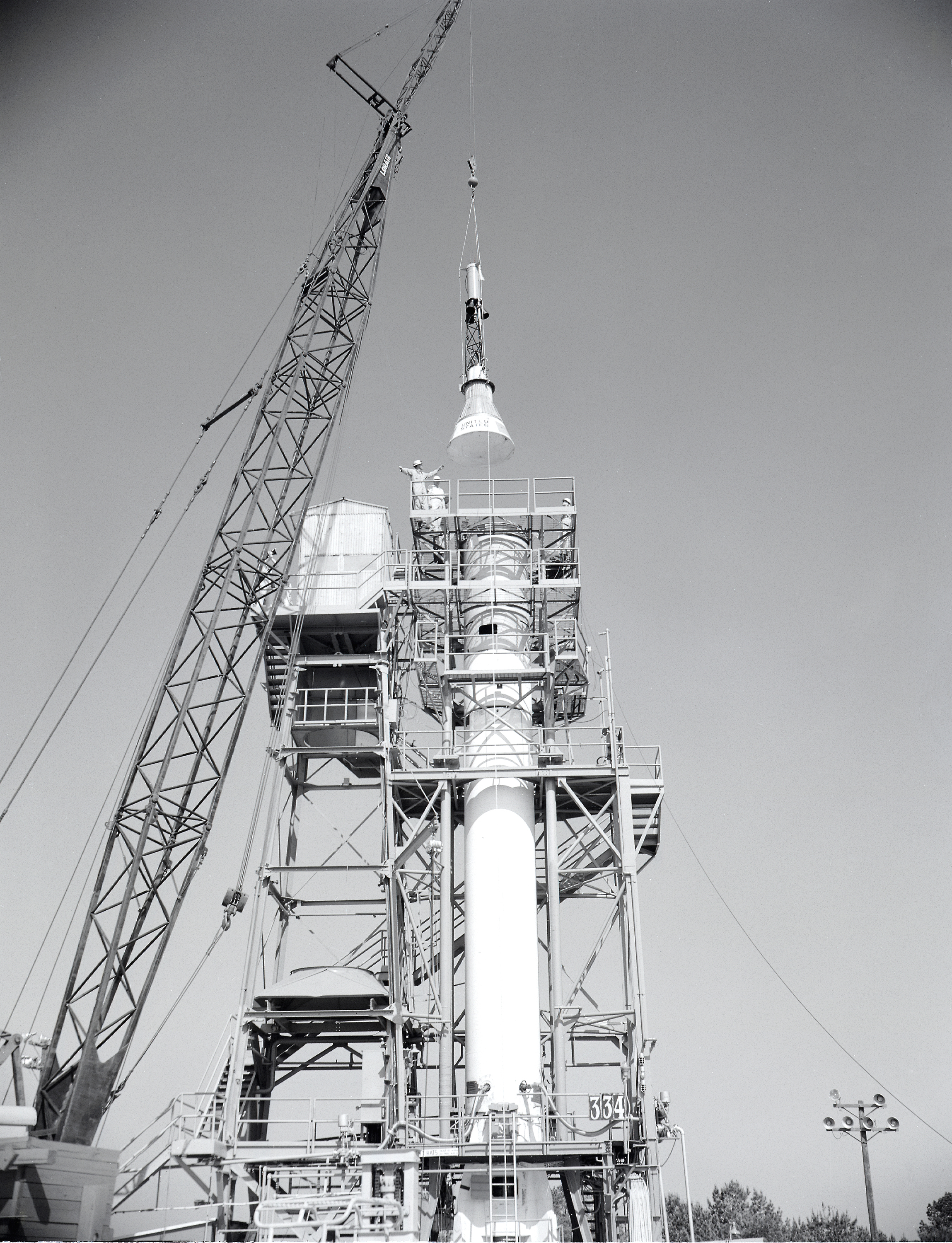
Installation of a Mercury capsule on the Mercury-Redstone Test Booster (TB) for Full (110-116 sec) runs, May 1960

As the space race continued, the civilian space agency, NASA started on October 1, 1958 but the Army kept von Braun and the ABMA for another year and a half. NASA's Project Mercury chose the "Old Reliable" Redstone, with its unmatched launch record, as America's first crewed launch vehicle. Nevertheless, the Army had to make improvements for crewed missions. The crew at the Interim Test Stand ran over 200 static firings to improve the Redstone propulsion system. In addition, all eight Mercury-Redstone launch vehicles endured a full duration acceptance test at the interim stand. On July 1, 1960, 4,670 people transferred from the ABMA to NASA forming the Marshall Space Flight Center (MSFC).

The first test flight, Mercury-Redstone 1, occurred on November 21, 1960. After rising a few inches off the launch pad, electrical cables disconnecting in the wrong order caused the engine to shut down. The launch vehicle sustained minor damage and was returned to MSFC. Static fire testing on the Redstone Test Stand in February 1961 verified that repairs were successful. The second test launch, Mercury-Redstone 1A, was successful on December 19, 1960. On January 31, 1961, a chimpanzee named Ham flew into space on Mercury-Redstone 2. Another test flight, Mercury-Redstone BD, added to evaluate changes, confirmed the system was ready.

Alan B. Shepard Jr. became the first American in space on May 5, 1961. Mercury-Redstone 3 was a suborbital flight to an altitude of 115 miles and a range of 302 miles. This flight demonstrated that man was capable of controlling a space vehicle during periods of weightlessness and high accelerations. The last Mercury-Redstone flight, Mercury-Redstone 4, also a crewed suborbital flight, carried Virgil I. Grissom to a peak altitude of 118 miles and safely landed him 303 miles downrange. The Redstone Test Stand contributed to the success of the first two Americans to fly in space.

== Epilogue ==
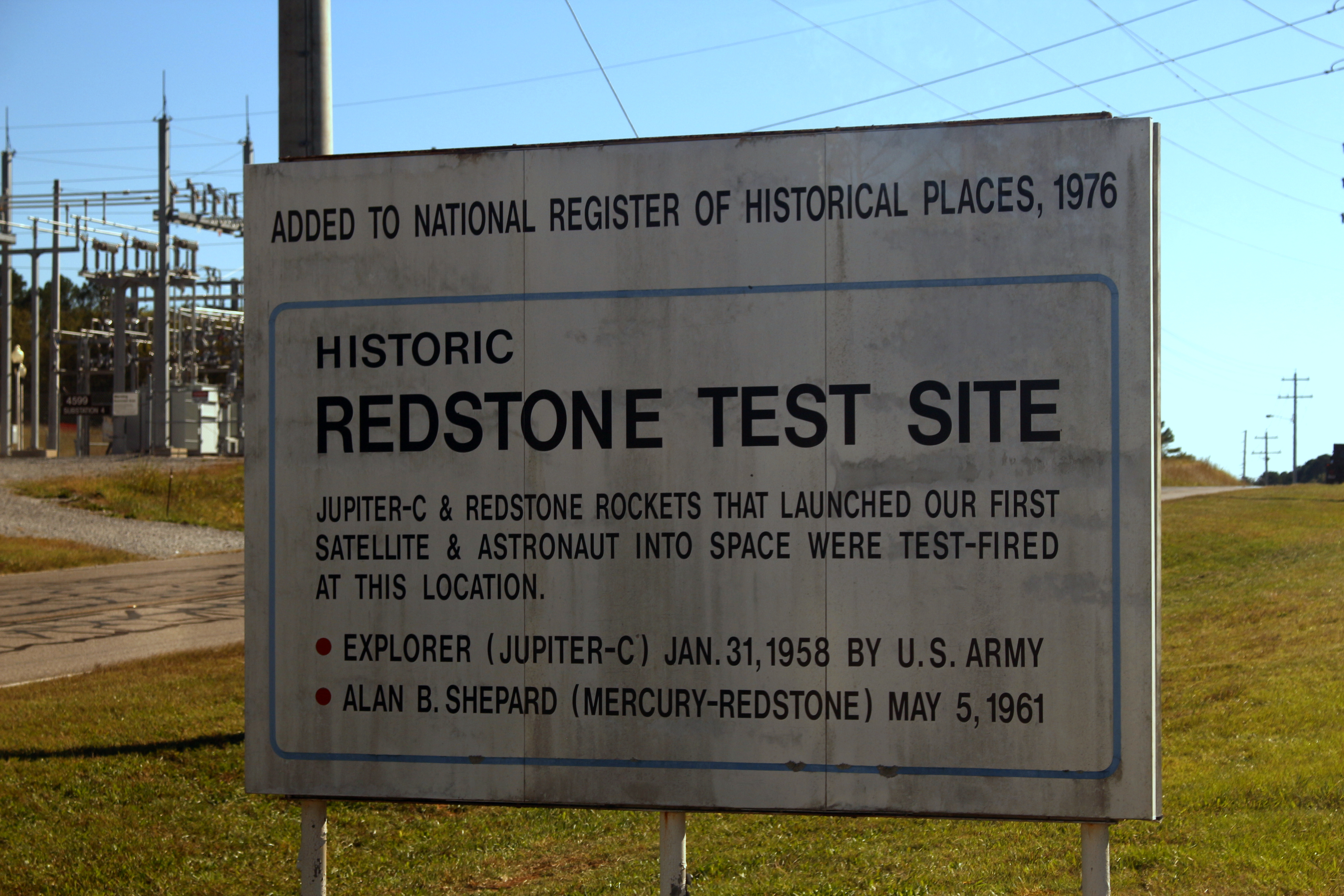

The Redstone Test Stand phased out of use in October, 1961. After becoming rundown and littered, the site was restored for the US Bicentennial. A Redstone missile, which US Army Missile Command (MICOM) loaned to NASA, was installed on February 27, 1976. It was listed on the National Register of Historic Places as being nationally significant on May 13, 1976. Alabama Section, American Society of Civil Engineers declared it an Alabama Historic Civil Engineering Landmark in 1979. It was declared a National Historic Landmark on October 3, 1985. The Interim Test Stand is in good condition.

== See also ==
- List of National Historic Landmarks in Alabama
- List of German rocket scientists in the United States
- Sputnik crisis
