= Redstone Arsenal =

United States Army post since 1941

- Redstone Arsenal, Alabama
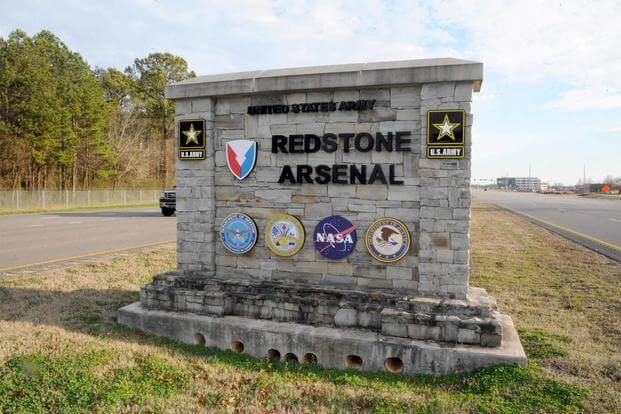
- Redstone Arsenal Sign, Gate 9

Site information
- Type: Army post
- Controlled by: United States Army
- Website: installations.militaryonesource.mil/in-depth-overview/redstone-arsenal

Location
- Coordinates: 34°41′03″N 86°39′15″W

Site history
- Built: 1941 (85 years ago)
- In use: 1941–present

Garrison information
- Garrison: U.S. Army Aviation and Missile Command; U.S. Army Materiel Command; Missile Defense Agency; U.S. Army Space and Missile Defense Command; DEVCOM Aviation and Missile Center

Redstone Arsenal is a United States Army base and census-designated place in Madison County, Alabama, adjacent to Huntsville, Alabama, in the Wheeler National Wildlife Refuge. It is part of the Huntsville-Decatur Combined Statistical Area. The arsenal hosts over 75 tenant agencies including many that are part of the Department of Defense such as the United States Space Command, NASA's largest field center (the Marshall Space Flight Center), and Department of Justice agencies including the Federal Bureau of Investigation.

The arsenal has a government and contractor workforce that averages 36,000 to 40,000 personnel daily. The base has benefited from decisions by the Defense Base Realignment and Closure Commission and has a residential population of 837 as of 2020.

Established during World War II as a chemical manufacturing facility, in the immediate post-war era the arsenal was used for research and development by former Nazi German rocket scientists who were brought to the United States as part of Operation Paperclip. The team first worked on ballistic missiles, starting with derivatives of the V-2 rocket, before moving on to a series of ever larger designs.

In 1956, the Army was relieved of most of its ballistic missiles in favor of similar weapons operated by the US Air Force. The German design team became part of the newly founded civilian NASA. The Cold War had moved to space, and the U.S. intended to compete with the Soviet Union there and across the globe. The arsenal served as the primary site for space launch vehicle design and testing into the 1960s.

== Geography ==
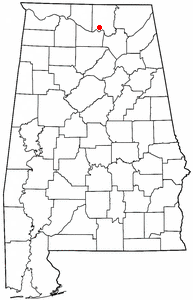
The location of Redstone Arsenal in Alabama

Redstone Arsenal is located at 34°41′03″N 86°39′15″W. The Redstone CDP has a total area of 7.8 square miles (20.1 km^{2}), all land, including extensive wetland areas associated with the Tennessee River and several local springs, much of which is maintained by the Wheeler National Wildlife Refuge.

== Tenant organizations, commands and units ==
- Department of Defense
  - United States Space Command
  - Missile Defense Agency
  - Defense Intelligence Agency
    - Missile and Space Intelligence Center
  - United States Army
    - US Army Space and Missile Defense Command/Army Forces Strategic Command
    - US Army Materiel Command
    - US Army Aviation and Missile Command
    - US Army Contracting Command
    - US Army Security Assistance Command
    - US Army Engineering and Support Center
    - US Army Combat Capabilities Development Command Aviation and Missile Center
    - Logistics Data Analysis Center (LDAC)
    - Redstone Test Center
    - PEO Aviation
    - PEO Missiles and Space
- National Aeronautics and Space Administration (NASA)
  - Marshall Space Flight Center
  - Blue Origin (Space Industry Support - Rocket Development/Testing)
- Department of Justice
  - Federal Bureau of Investigation
    - Operations and Analytical Support Headquarters
    - Terrorist Explosive Device Analytical Center (TEDAC)
    - Hazardous Device School
    - Tennessee Valley Regional Computer Forensics Lab (TVRCFL)
  - Bureau of Alcohol, Tobacco, Firearms and Explosives (ATF)
    - National Center for Explosives Training and Research

== History ==
=== Pre-1941 ===
The land occupied by the Redstone Arsenal was previously inhabited by Native Americans. 651 prehistoric archaeological sites have been archived at Redstone Arsenal to date. At least 22 have components dating to the Paleo-Indian period (9200 to 8000 BC). The Paleo-Indian handhewn projectile point called the Redstone Point was named after the Arsenal where it was first identified.

Euro-Americans settlers began to establish homesteads on the land that is now Redstone Arsenal by the first decade of the 19th century. Prior to the Civil War, the landscape was dominated by several large plantations, the remains of which survive as archaeological sites. The land played a peripheral role during the Civil War with activity limited to the posting of pickets along the Tennessee River bank. Following the war, many of the large plantations were increasingly divided into smaller parcels owned by small farmers, who included former slaves and their descendants. By the start of the 20th century, many of the farms were owned by absentee owners, with the land being worked by tenants and sharecroppers. The remains of hundreds of tenant and sharecropper houses still dot the landscape around the installation.

At the beginning of the 20th century, the approximately 57-square-mile (150 km^{2}) area of rolling terrain, which contained some of the richest agricultural land in Madison County, included such small farming communities as Spring Hill, Pond Beat, Mullins Flat, and Union Hill. Although there was no electricity, indoor plumbing, or telephones, few roads, and fewer cars or tractors, the people who lived in the area prospered enough to support their own stores, mills, shops, gins, churches, and schools. A total of 46 historic cemeteries including slave cemeteries, plantation family cemeteries, and late 19th to early 20th century community cemeteries are maintained on the installation as Redstone Arsenal cemeteries.

=== Huntsville Arsenal ===
As part of the mobilization leading to U.S. involvement in World War II, Huntsville Arsenal was established in 1941 to create an inland chemical weapons plant in addition to one in Edgewood, Maryland. It was announced by the War Department on July 3, 1941. Over 550 families were displaced when the Army acquired the land, including over 300 tenants and sharecroppers. Most of the landowners were allowed to salvage their assets and rebuild elsewhere. The remaining buildings were almost all razed by the War Department. A land-use agreement was arranged with the Tennessee Valley Authority for the Army to use about 1,250 acres (5.1 km^{2}) of land along the Tennessee River.

The military installation was originally composed of three separate entities: the Huntsville Arsenal and the Huntsville Depot (later the Gulf Chemical Warfare Depot), which were operated under the auspices of the Chemical Warfare Service; and the Redstone Ordnance Plant, operated by the United States Army Ordnance Department. The name Redstone drew on the region's red rocks and soil.

In the immediate post-war era the Arsenal was used for research and development by German weapons rocket scientists who had been brought to the U.S. as part of Operation Paperclip. The team first worked on ballistic missiles, starting with V-2 rocket derivatives, before moving on to a series of ever larger designs. Many of their tests were carried out at White Sands Missile Range and flights between the two locations were common. In late 1956 the Army was relieved of most of its ballistic missiles in favor of similar weapons operated by the US Air Force.

The German design team was spun off to become part of the newly founded National Aeronautics and Space Administration (NASA). The Cold War had moved to space, and the US intended to compete with the Soviet Union there as well as across the globe. The Arsenal served as the primary site for space launch vehicle design into the 1960s.

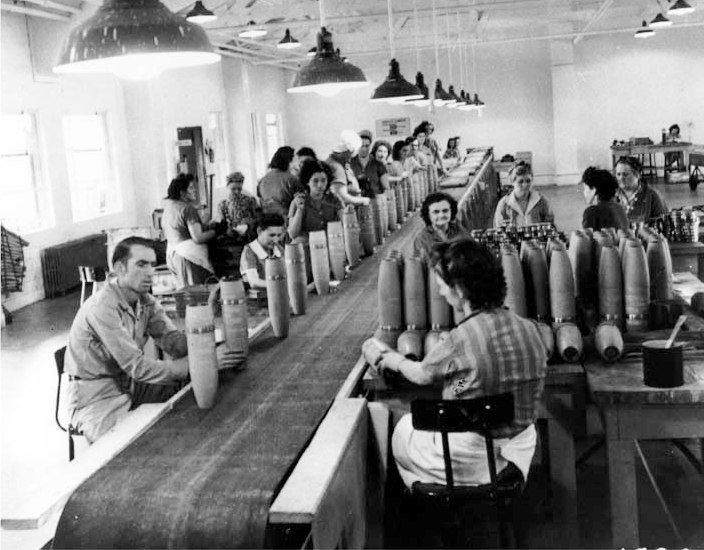
1940s munitions production at Huntsville Arsenal

In its early years, the arsenal produced and stockpiled chemical weapons such as phosgene, Lewisite, and mustard gas. The use of toxic gases in warfare was banned under the Geneva Protocol of 1925, but the U.S. signed with the reservation that it be allowed to use chemical weapons against aggressors who used them. The facility also produced carbonyl iron powder (for radio and radar tuning), tear gas, and smoke and incendiary devices. The arsenal also produced small pyrotechnic devices including small solid-fuel rockets during the war.

In recognition of its production record, the arsenal received the Army-Navy "E" Award four times, the first on October 31, 1942. The ordnance plant was renamed Redstone Arsenal in 1943. Through the war years, more than 27,000,000 items of chemical munitions were produced and 45,200,000 ammunition shells were loaded. Redstone Army Airfield was established in 1943 for the 6th Army Air Force to test incendiary devices in preparation for the firebombing of Japanese cities.

Three days after the announcement of the Japanese surrender, production facilities at the installation were put on standby. After the war, Huntsville Arsenal was briefly used as the primary storage facility for the Chemical Warfare Service, and for manufacture of gas masks and dismantling of surplus incendiary bombs. Most of the wartime civilian workforce was furloughed, dropping to 600 from a wartime high of around 4,400. Much of the arsenal land was leased for agriculture, and many of the buildings were leased for local industry. By 1947, the installation was declared to be excess, the first step toward demilitarization.

Major political and commercial efforts were made in searching for government or business tenants for the space. In early 1948, several buildings of Huntsville Arsenal were leased by the newly formed Keller Motors Corporation with the intention of establishing a major automobile manufacturing complex. Only 18 Keller prototype vehicles were built before the firm's president and primary organizer, George Keller, suddenly died and the operation folded.

The Army Air Forces was searching for a site to establish a major air development center and considered Huntsville Arsenal. In 1949, a competing site near Tullahoma, Tennessee was selected. The Office of the Assistant Secretary of the Army then directed that Huntsville Arsenal be advertised for sale by 1 July 1949. The proposed sale never happened, because the Army found it needed the land for the new mission of developing and testing rocket systems. Thiokol Corporation moved operations to Redstone Arsenal from Maryland in the summer of 1949 to research and develop rocket propellants, while Rohm and Haas began work on rockets and jet propulsion. On June 30, 1949, Huntsville Arsenal was deactivated and consolidated with the other two entities to become Redstone Arsenal. Command responsibilities were assumed by Redstone.

=== Army Ordnance Corps ===
At the close of World War II, a number of key German scientists and engineers were brought to the United States under Operation Paperclip. Colonel Holger Toftoy arranged for 127 individuals, including Wernher von Braun, to receive contracts for work on Army missiles. In late 1945, they began arriving at Fort Bliss, Texas, where, using components brought from Germany, started upgrading the V-2 missile. Testing was done at the nearby White Sands Proving Ground in New Mexico.

On June 1, 1949, the Chief of Ordnance of the United States Army designated Redstone Arsenal as the Ordnance Rocket Center, its facility for ordnance rocket research and development. In April 1950, the Fort Bliss missile development operation, then with 130 German contract employees, 120 civil-service employees, and 500 military personnel, was transferred to Redstone Arsenal. This became the Ordnance Guided Missile Center (OGMC), with Major James Hamill as acting commander and von Braun as technical director. An initial project was the Major tactical missile.

Upon the outbreak of the Korean War in June 1950, OGMC was given the mission of developing a surface-to-surface ballistic missile with an objective range of 500 miles (800 km). Starting with an upgraded Major missile, the design went through a series of improvements and ultimately became the PGM-11 with the popular name Redstone rocket. To expedite development, an existing engine was used, greatly reducing the operational range to between 58 and 200 miles.

During the Korean War, ammunition production was resumed at Redstone Arsenal. From July 1951 through July 1955, around 38,700,000 rounds of chemical artillery munitions were produced.

The Ordnance Missile Laboratories (OML) was formed in 1952 to coordinate research and development within the OGMC. Holger Toftoy, who had originally recruited von Braun and his team of missile specialists, was assigned to Huntsville and promoted to Brigadier General as director of the OML. Test operations were under Kurt Debus, who set up the Interim Test Stand and the launch facility at Cape Canaveral, Florida. Redstone static fire testing began in the spring of 1953, followed by the first launch at Cape Canaveral on August 20, 1953.

The OML had many other research and development programs. Under Toftoy, the organization included the R&D Division under Col. Miles Birkett Chatfield, the Field Service Division under Maj. Ben Keyserling, and the Industrial Division. In the R&D Division there were the Surface-to-Air Projects under Maj. Rudy Axelson, the Surface-to-Surface Division under Maj. Dan Breedon, and Special Projects under Lt. Colonel John O'Conner. Projects in Surface-to-Air included the Nike B (later called the Nike Hercules), Hawk and others.

Surface-to-Surface projects were the Honest John, Little John, Lacrosse, and Corporal Type III; the liquid-fueled Corporal Type III was soon canceled and the solid Thiokol fueled Sergeant project started. The Jet Propulsion Laboratory (JPL) at the California Institute of Technology was an Army research operation at that time, as NASA did not exist at the time. It was JPL that designed the Corporal system and later was the R&D designer of the Sergeant.

At a 1954 meeting of the Spaceflight Committee of the American Rocket Society, von Braun proposed placing a satellite into orbit using the Redstone with clusters of small solid-fuel rockets on top. The proposal, Project Orbiter, was rejected in 1955.

=== Ordnance schools ===
In March 1952, the commanding officer at Redstone Arsenal officially established the Provisional Redstone Ordnance School. In December, the Ordnance Guided Missile School (OGMS) was established, taking over the provisional operation. The OGMS greatly expanded through the years, occupying a large land area with many buildings and providing a wide variety of missile and munitions courses for thousands of students from the U.S. as well as many foreign countries.

In 1966, the name was changed to the Missile and Munitions Center & School, and then to the Ordnance Missile and Munitions Center and School in the mid-1980s. In 1994, the School Brigade disbanded and was replaced by the reformed 59th Ordnance Brigade, which had previously disbanded in Europe in 1992. In 2002, the school was renamed the Ordnance Munitions and Electronic Maintenance School, and moved to Fort Lee in 2011.

=== Army Ballistic Missile Agency ===
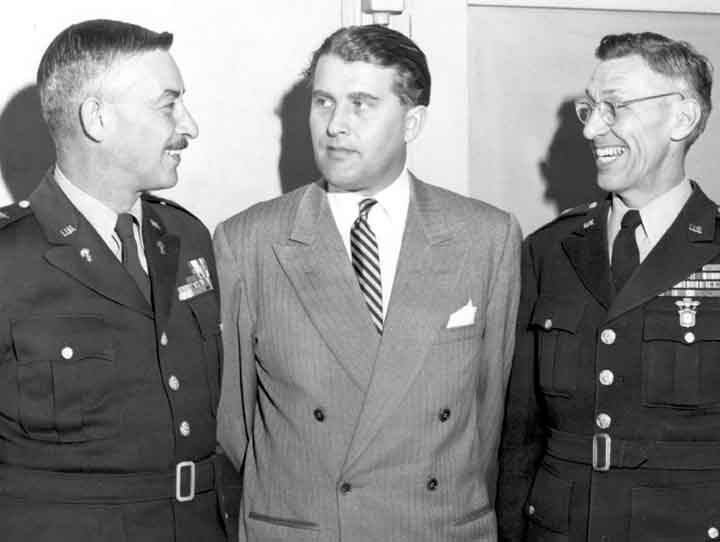
RSA commander Maj. Gen. John Medaris, Wernher von Braun, and RSA deputy commander Brig. Gen. Holger Toftoy (left to right) in the 1950s

The Army Ballistic Missile Agency (ABMA), commanded by Maj. Gen. John Medaris, was formed on 1 February 1956, taking over from Redstone Arsenal the facilities and personnel of OGMC. Von Braun was the Director of ABMA's Development Operations Division. Redstone Arsenal then became an Army post, supporting the ABMA and, in the future, other agencies. Medaris also commanded RSA, and BG Toftoy was deputy.

The ABMA's primary mission was developing and fielding the Army's first intermediate-range ballistic missile, the Jupiter. By August 1958, the system was delivered to the Air Force for early deployment overseas. Jupiter deployment to Turkey later proved to be a cause of and significant bargaining chip in the Cuban Missile Crisis. During his command, Medaris' operation also fielded the PGM-11 Redstone and MIM-23 Hawk missiles, accelerated the development of the Nike Zeus system, and began development of the MGM-31 Pershing missile system, which later played a role in ending the Cold War.

As part of the 1957–58 International Geophysical Year, both the U.S. and the Soviet Union proposed to launch a scientific satellite. Although von Braun had proposed in 1954 that the OML could place a satellite in Earth orbit, the Naval Research Laboratory, using its Vanguard rocket, was given this assignment.

On October 4, 1957, the USSR orbited Sputnik I, the first Earth satellite. A second Sputnik was launched a month later. On December 6, 1957, a first attempt to launch a satellite-carrying Vanguard failed. Toftoy, Medaris, and von Braun immediately pleaded for the opportunity to show what the Army's "space team" could do. The go-ahead was given and on 31 January 1958, America's first satellite, Explorer I, was placed into orbit using a modified Jupiter launch vehicle (a four-stage system designated Juno I).

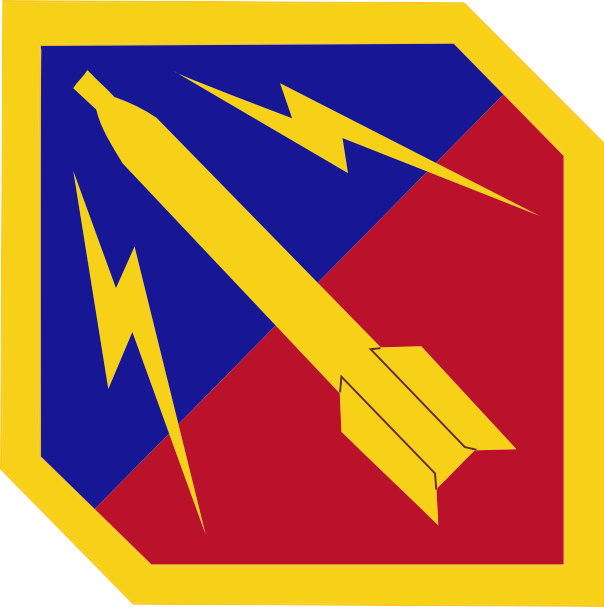
Ordnance Missile Command SSI

By 1958, 20,000 civilian, military, and contractor workers were employed within Redstone Arsenal. The Army Ordnance Missile Command (AOMC) was formed in March 1958. Headquartered at Redstone Arsenal and commanded by Maj. Gen. Medaris, AOMC had several subordinate elements, including ABMA, White Sands Missile Range, and the Jet Propulsion Laboratory at California Institute of Technology. Another local activity, the Army Rocket and Guided Missile Agency (ARGMA), was formed and added to AOMC in June.

Six months after Explorer I, President Dwight Eisenhower created the National Aeronautics and Space Administration (NASA) on July 29, 1958. On October 21, 1959, he approved the transfer of all Army space-related activities to NASA. This was accomplished effective July 1, 1960, when 4,670 civilian employees, about $100 million worth of buildings and equipment, and 1,840 acres (7.4 km^{2}) of land transferred from RSA/ABMA's Development Operations Division to NASA's George C. Marshall Space Flight Center (MSFC). Von Braun was MSFC's first director.

=== Army Missile Command ===
The U.S. Army Missile Command (MICOM) was activated on August 1, 1962 at Redstone Arsenal, absorbing all of the personnel, facilities, and projects remaining in the prior AOMC. On March 12, 1964, the Francis J. McMorrow Missile Laboratories were dedicated in memory of MICOM's first commander, who died while in command.

Dating from the start of AMC, Project Nike involving anti-aircraft missiles had been conducted. As the intercontinental ballistic missile (ICBM) came into being, a much higher-performance system was needed for ICBM defense. The Advanced Research Projects Agency (ARPA) examined the requirements and recommending a system, designated Nike-X, incorporating phased-array radars, high-performance computers, and separate low-altitude (Sprint) and high-altitude (Spartan) high-velocity interceptor missiles. To manage this development, in 1963 MICOM created the Nike-X Project Office headed by Colonel (later Brigadier General) Ivy O. Drewry.

The People's Republic of China exploded its first thermonuclear bomb in June 1967. Hence, ABM system requirements were revised and the Sentinel System was born, replacing Nike-X. In 1968, the Army Ballistic Missile Defense Agency (ABMDA) was formed, taking over Sentinel and other ballistic missile defense projects previously under MICOM. Commanded by B. G. Drewry, ABMDA established operations adjacent to Redstone Arsenal in the Cummings Research Park. In May 1974, all ballistic missile defense efforts were consolidated under a single manager in the Ballistic Missile Defense Organization, which eventually evolved into today's U.S. Army Space and Missile Defense Command.

On July 17, 1997, the former Army Missile Command combined with the aviation portion of the U.S. Army Aviation and Troop Command (ATCOM), creating a new organization at RSA, the United States Army Aviation and Missile Command (AMCOM).

=== Today ===
Redstone Arsenal remains the center of testing, development, and doctrine for the Army's missile programs. Besides the U.S. Army Materiel Command and the U.S. Army Aviation and Missile Life Cycle Management Command, Redstone houses the Tactical UAV Project Office, Redstone Test Center (RTC), the Missile Defense Agency, the Missile and Space Intelligence Center, and other operations.

After operating as a tenant on Redstone Arsenal for over half a century, the Ordnance Munitions and Maintenance School was moved to Fort Lee (formerly Fort Gregg-Adams), Virginia.

Redstone Arsenal continues to host the Marshall Space Flight Center, NASA's largest field center for propulsion analysis and development, which developed the Saturn rocket family in the 1960s and propulsion systems for the Space Shuttle in the 1970s and 1980s.

Redstone Scientific Information Center, a 450,000-volume library established by NASA and the Army in 1962, was shuttered on September 30, 2019. The cost-saving measure was announced by Combat Capabilities Development Command Aviation & Missile Center (AvMC); selected documents from Redstone were acquired by NASA's Marshall Space Flight Center.

On September 2, 2025, United States President Donald Trump announced that the United States Space Command Headquarters would be moved from Peterson Space Force Base in Colorado to Redstone Arsenal.

== Demographics ==
Historical population
Census	Pop.	Note	%±
1980	5,728		—
1990	4,909		−14.3%
2000	2,365		−51.8%
2010	1,946		−17.7%
2020	837		−57.0%
2024 (est.)	690	▼	−17.6%
U.S. Decennial Census

Redstone Arsenal saw a decline in population in 2024 estimates.

Redstone Arsenal first appeared as a census designated place in the 1980 U.S. Census

=== 2020 census ===
Redstone Arsenal CDP, Alabama – Racial and ethnic composition Note: the US Census treats Hispanic/Latino as an ethnic category. This table excludes Latinos from the racial categories and assigns them to a separate category. Hispanics/Latinos may be of any race.
Race / Ethnicity (NH = Non-Hispanic)	Pop 2000	Pop 2010	Pop 2020	% 2000	% 2010	% 2020
White alone (NH)	1,243	1,232	479	52.56%	63.31%	57.23%
Black or African American alone (NH)	732	377	225	30.95%	19.37%	26.88%
Native American or Alaska Native alone (NH)	8	20	4	0.34%	1.03%	0.48%
Asian alone (NH)	45	33	27	1.90%	1.70%	3.23%
Native Hawaiian or Pacific Islander alone (NH)	12	7	3	0.51%	0.36%	0.36%
Other race alone (NH)	5	6	0	0.21%	0.31%	0.00%
Mixed race or Multiracial (NH)	100	62	48	4.23%	3.19%	5.73%
Hispanic or Latino (any race)	220	209	51	9.30%	10.74%	6.09%
Total	2,365	1,946	837	100.00%	100.00%	100.00%

=== 2010 census ===
In the 2010 census, there were 1,946 people, 343 households, and 301 families residing in the CDP. There were 379 housing units. The racial makeup of the CDP was 69.1% White, 20.8% Black or African American, 1.2% Native American, 1.7% Asian, 0.4% Pacific Islander, 2.9% from other races, and 4.0% from two or more races. 10.7% of the population were Hispanic or Latino of any race.

There were 343 households, out of which 68.2% had children under the age of 18 living with them, 72.6% were married couples living together, 13.1% had a female householder with no husband present, and 12.2% were non-families. 11.4% of all households were made up of individuals, and none had someone living alone who was 65 years of age or older. The average household size was 3.27 and the average family size was 3.56.

24.8% of the population was aged under 18, 36.1% were aged from 18 to 24, 33.0% from 25 to 44, 5.8% from 45 to 64, and 0.3% who were 65 years of age or older. The median age was 21.9 years. For every 100 females, there were 203.6 males. For every 100 females age 18 and over, there were 249.6 males.

The median income for a household in the CDP was $53,142. The median family income was $48,750. Men had a median income of $31,018 versus $25,500 for females. The per capita income was $24,739. About 0% of families and 0% of the population were below the poverty line, including 0% of those under age 18 and none of those age 65 or over.

=== 2000 census ===
In the 2000 census, there were 2,353 people, 487 households, and 446 families residing in the CDP. The population density was 300.8 inhabitants per square mile (116.1/km^{2}). There were 879 housing units at an average density of 111.8 per square mile (43.2/km^{2}). The racial makeup of the CDP was 56.5% White, 31.7% Black or African American, 0.4% Native American, 2.0% Asian, 0.8% Pacific Islander, 3.3% from other races, and 4.8% from two or more races. 9.3% of the population were Hispanic or Latino of any race.

There were 487 households, out of which 79.5% had children under the age of 18 living with them, 79.7% were married couples living together, 8.8% had a female householder with no husband present, and 8.4% were non-families. 7.8% of all households were made up of individuals, and none had someone living alone who was 65 years of age or older. The average household size was 3.48 and the average family size was 3.67.

32.9% of the population was aged under 18, 19.2% were aged from 18 to 24, 43.2% from 25 to 44, 4.6% from 45 to 64, and 0.1% who were 65 years of age or older. The median age was 24 years. For every 100 females, there were 150.5 males. For every 100 females age 18 and over, there were 170.1 males.

The median income for a household in the CDP was $35,435. The median family income was $40,208. Men had a median income of $29,053 versus $24,063 for females. The per capita income was $14,860. About 9.0% of families and 10.4% of the population were below the poverty line, including 11.7% of those under age 18 and none of those age 65 or over.

Gallery of Redstone Arsenal images
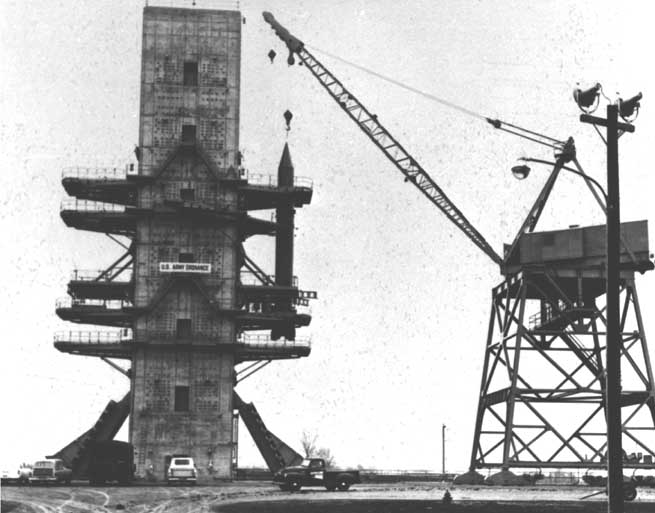
1956: Redstone missile testing on a Static Test Stand

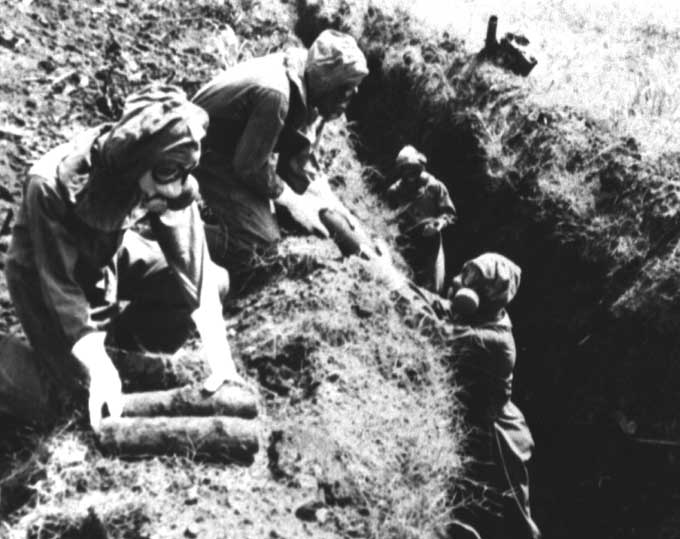
1957: Contaminated land and buildings at RSA were reclaimed by Chemical Corps personnel.

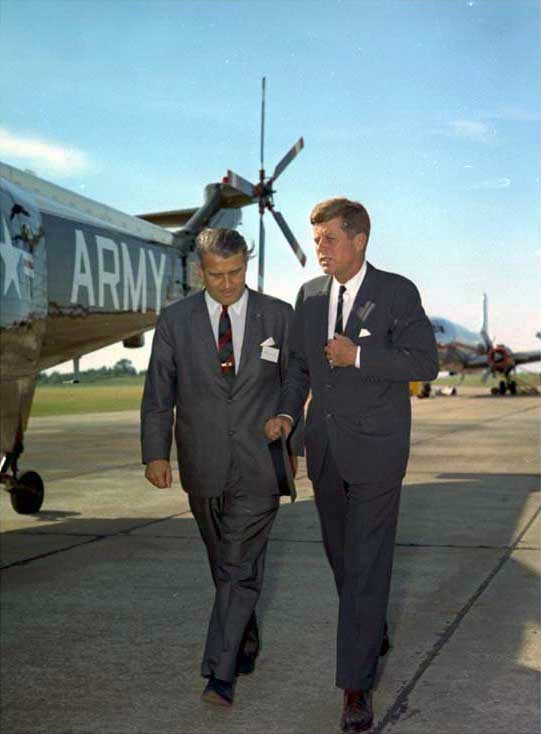
18 May 1963: Wernher von Braun with president John F. Kennedy at RSA

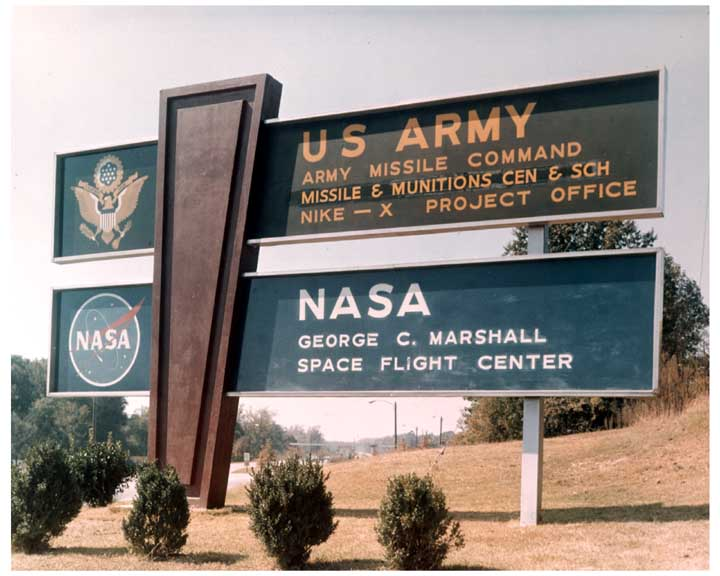
RSA main gate c. 1964

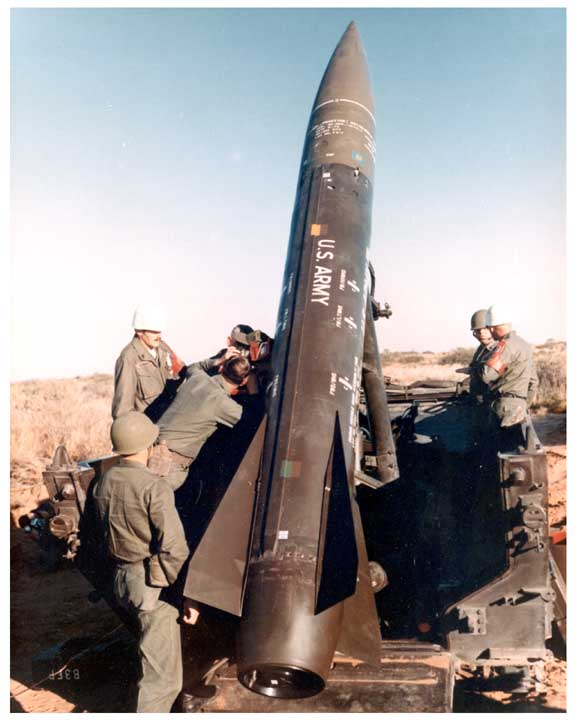
MGM-52 Lance missile testing at RSA c. 1970

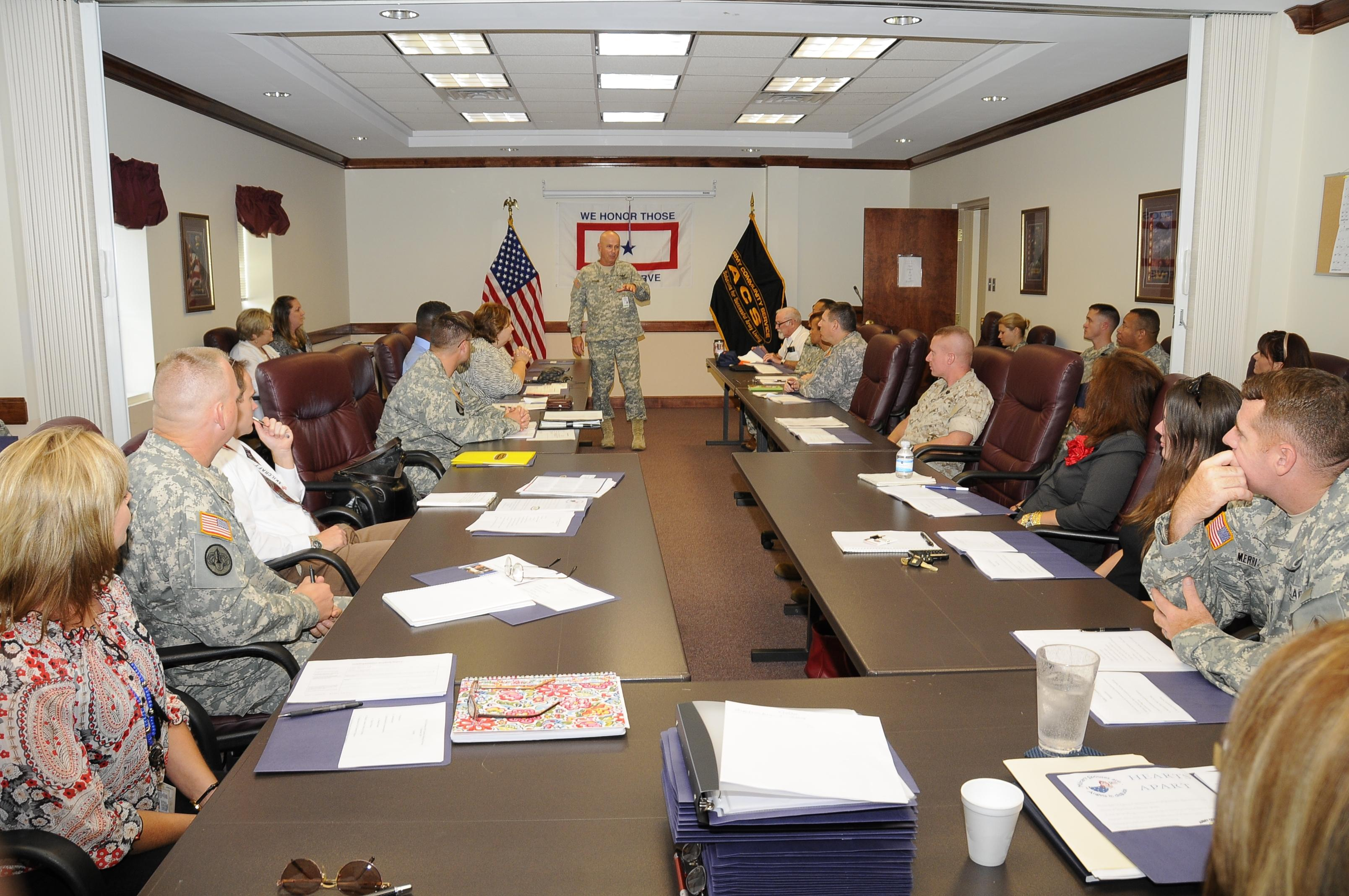
RSA commander Maj. Gen. Jim Myles speaks at a Community Family Readiness Group meeting in 2009.

== Education ==
The census-designated place, which includes on-base housing, is in the Madison County Schools school district.
