= Rosenaustadion =

Football stadium in Bavaria, Germany

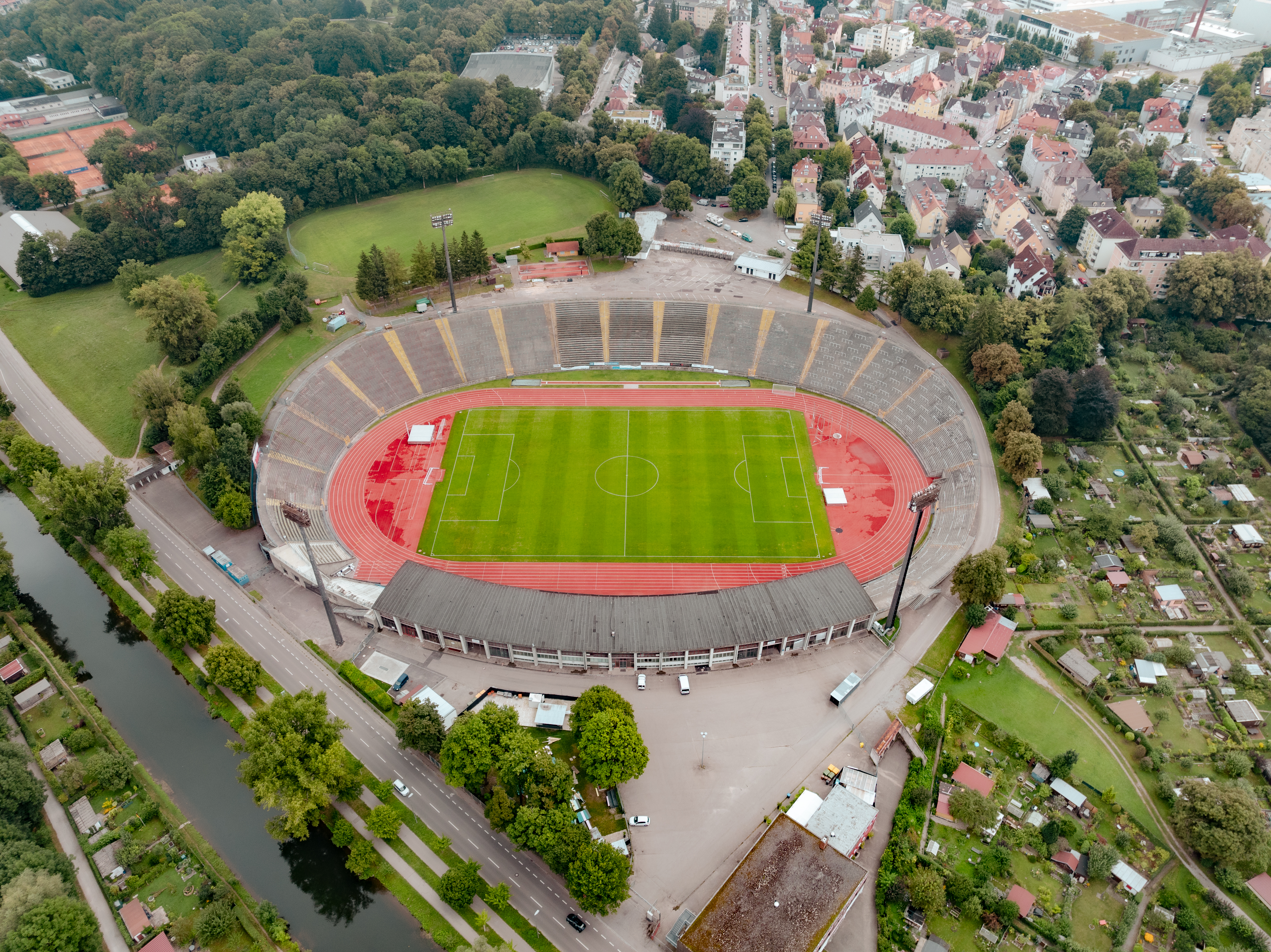
- Interactive map of Rosenaustadion
- Address: Stadionstraße 21, 86159 Augsburg, Germany
- Location: Augsburg, Bavaria, Germany
- Coordinates: 48°21′19″N 10°52′34″E
- Owner: City of Augsburg
- Capacity: 32,354; 5,911 (Seats)
- Surface: grass
- Scoreboard: yes (one)
- Record attendance: 64,856; 9 November 1952; Germany vs Switzerland
- Field size: 105 x 70 m

Construction
- Groundbreaking: 1949
- Built: 1951 (75 years ago)
- Opened: 16 September 1951
- Renovated: 2006−2007
- Cost: DM 1.1–1.8 million
- Architects: First plans: Thomas Wechs; Final plans: Georg Werner and Walther Schmidt; Collaborators: Hans Bruckner, Jakob Heichele and Heinz Hilten

Tenants
- FC Augsburg Women (2006−Present); FC Augsburg II (1969−Present); FC Augsburg (1951−2009)

Rosenaustadion is a multi-purpose stadium in Augsburg, Bavaria, Germany. Built in 1951, it is a heritage listed monument and was the largest stadium in Augsburg for 58 years until 2009 when the Augsburg Arena was opened. With a spectator capacity of 32,354, it is primarily used for football matches and track & field athletics events. It is the current home ground for FC Augsburg Women and FC Augsburg II. It is the former home of the FC Augsburg men's first team, who played at the ground between 1951 and 2009.

== History ==
The stadium was built from 1949, using debris from the aerial bombings of the Second World War. The original plans for the stadium however go back to 1926. A temporary narrow gauge railway line ran from 1946 from the city centre to the construction site, carrying 185,000 tonnes of debris to be used at the new stadium.

The Rosenaustadion was opened on 16 September 1951 with a Germany versus Austria football match, a B-international, drawing a crowd of 51,000.

From 1951 to 1972 the Rosenaustadion possessed an outstanding meaning for German sport, particularly in the disciplines of football and athletics, due to its size and modernity. With the opening of Munich's Olympiastadion for the 1972 Summer Olympics, this position was lessened. Despite this, the stadium did host five football matches during these games.

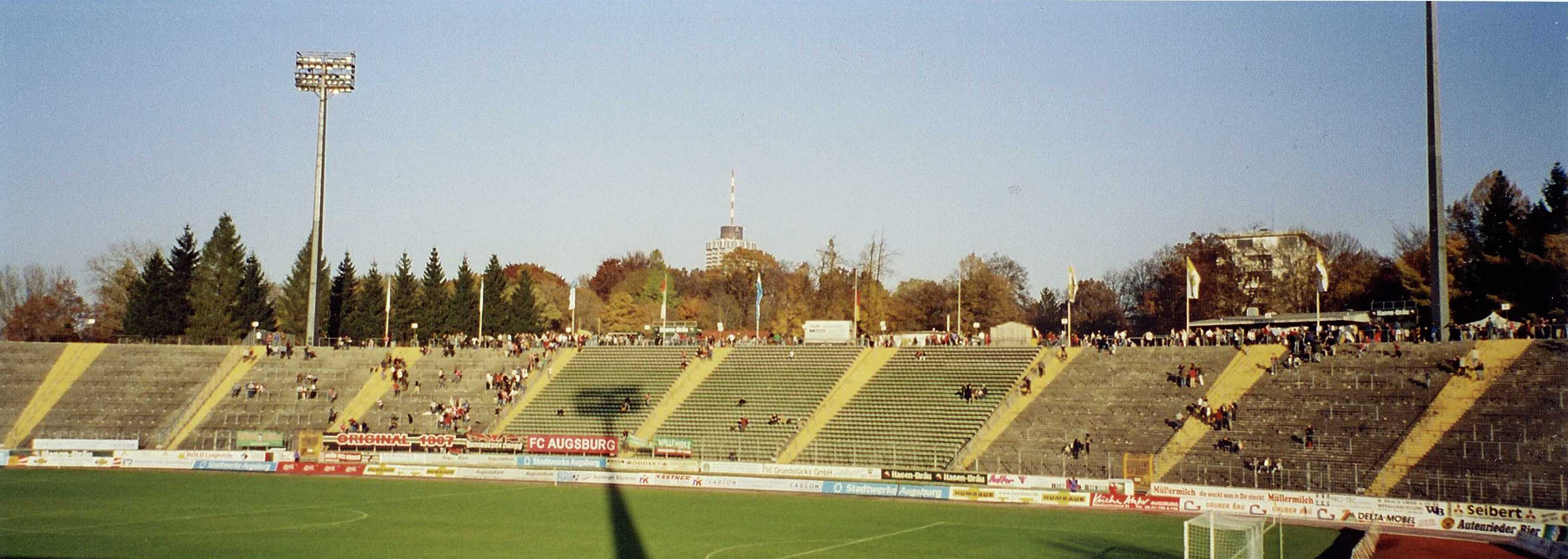
Rosenaustadion

The record attendance of FC Augsburg dates from 1973 with the game against the 1. FC Nürnberg with 42,000 spectators. The highest attendance at a football game was nearly 65,000 spectators on 9 November 1952 with the international match Germany – Switzerland.

The total record is from the year 1958, as 85.000 came to see the athletics team of Germany defeating the Russian team.

The record crowd for the home side FC Augsburg is 45,000, which attended the game in the Regionalliga Süd versus 1. FC Nürnberg on 3 August 1974.
