= Kuha =

Kuha may refer to:

- Qwiha, a town in Ethiopia
- KUHA, a predecessor of the KHVU radio of Houston, US
- Kuha, two classes of Finnish Navy minesweepers:
  - Kuha-class minesweeper (1941)
  - Kuha-class minesweeper (1974)
- Jouko Kuha, Finnish long-distance runner
- Kuha, Finland, a village in the municipality of Ranua, Finland
- Kuha (Internet meme), a Finnish Internet meme

== See also ==
- Kuhe (disambiguation)
