= Kuhe =

Kuhe may refer to:

- Wilhelm Kuhe (1823–1912), a German pianist and piano teacher
- Kuhe, Bhiwandi, a village in Bhiwandi taluka, Thane, Maharashtra, India

== See also ==
- Kuha (disambiguation)
