= Redstone Arsenal cemeteries =

Group of historic cemeteries in Alabama, USA

- Interactive map of Redstone Arsenal cemeteries

Details
- Established: Prehistoric – Modern era
- Location: Madison County, Alabama
- Country: United States
- Coordinates: 34.684°N 86.654°W
- Type: Federal
- Owned by: United States Army

The Redstone Arsenal cemeteries are a grouping of historic cemeteries on the Redstone Arsenal property in Madison County, Alabama, all administered by the United States Army. Prior to Army acquisition of the land in 1941 through 1942, the area was occupied by several loosely-knit rural communities which included at least 46 individual cemeteries.

The historic cemeteries that remain include plantation family plots, probable slave cemeteries, and Reconstruction era through early 20th century community cemeteries. Following the displacement of roughly 550 families by the acquisition of over 40,000 acres (160 km^{2}) of land including both historic cemeteries and archaeological sites with the potential for containing human burials, the Army initially considered establishing a new cemetery on the northeast end of the installation and moving all of the historic interments to this new location. This plan was never implemented.

After the United States Congress passed the National Cemetery Act in 1973, discussion of establishing a National Cemetery at Redstone Arsenal was revived since the Mobile National Cemetery, the only other National Cemetery in Alabama at the time, was out of space, partially due to the dramatic casualty load from the Vietnam War. After consulting with the Army Memorial Affairs Agency, however, it was decided that there was no need to expand the current national cemetery program. There was no discussion at this time of relocating any of the cemeteries on the installation.

The 46 cemeteries continue to be maintained in situ as long as the Army owns the land, per the Army's responsibility according to Army regulations.

== Historic importance ==
In addition to the named cemeteries managed by the Army on Redstone Arsenal, there are numerous prehistoric archaeological sites with the potential for human burials. The arsenal is located in an area with a high density of historic and prehistoric archaeological sites. The cemeteries and archaeological sites on Redstone Arsenal are U.S. Army-protected properties. Vandalism or looting of these protected properties is a felony.

There are a total of 948 archaeological sites to date, 503 of these are prehistoric, 297 are historic, and 148 have components of both.
