= Redstone Army Airfield =

Coordinates: 34°40′43″N 086°41′05″W

Redstone Army Airfield (AAF)
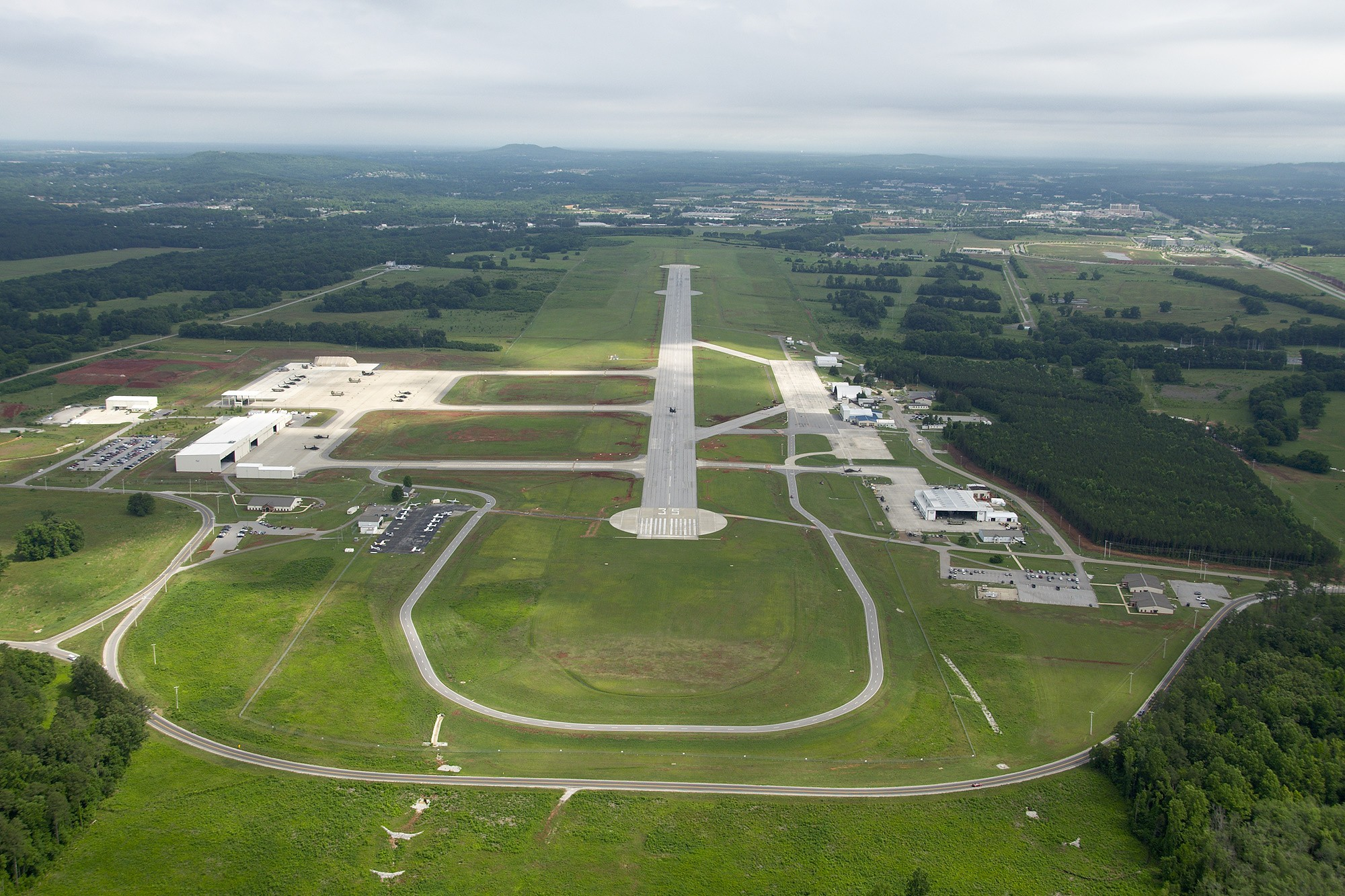
- IATA: HUA; ICAO: KHUA; FAA LID: HUA

Summary
- Airport type: Military
- Operator: United States Army
- Serves: Redstone Arsenal
- Location: Madison County, near Huntsville, Alabama
- Elevation AMSL: 685 ft / 209 m
- Interactive map of Redstone Army Airfield (AAF)

Runways
Direction	Length		Surface
Direction	ft	m	Surface
17/35	7,297	2,224	Asphalt
- Sources: FAA, official site

Redstone Army Airfield or Redstone AAF (IATA: HUA, ICAO: KHUA, FAA LID: HUA) is a military airport located at Redstone Arsenal, six miles (10 km) southwest of the city of Huntsville in Madison County, Alabama, United States. The airfield was originally constructed for munitions testing for the U.S. Army and the U.S. Army Air Forces through the 6th AAF Base Unit (Proving Ground Detachment). It is currently used to support the U.S. Army Aviation and Missile Command, NASA, and other U.S. government aviation and space activities.

== History ==
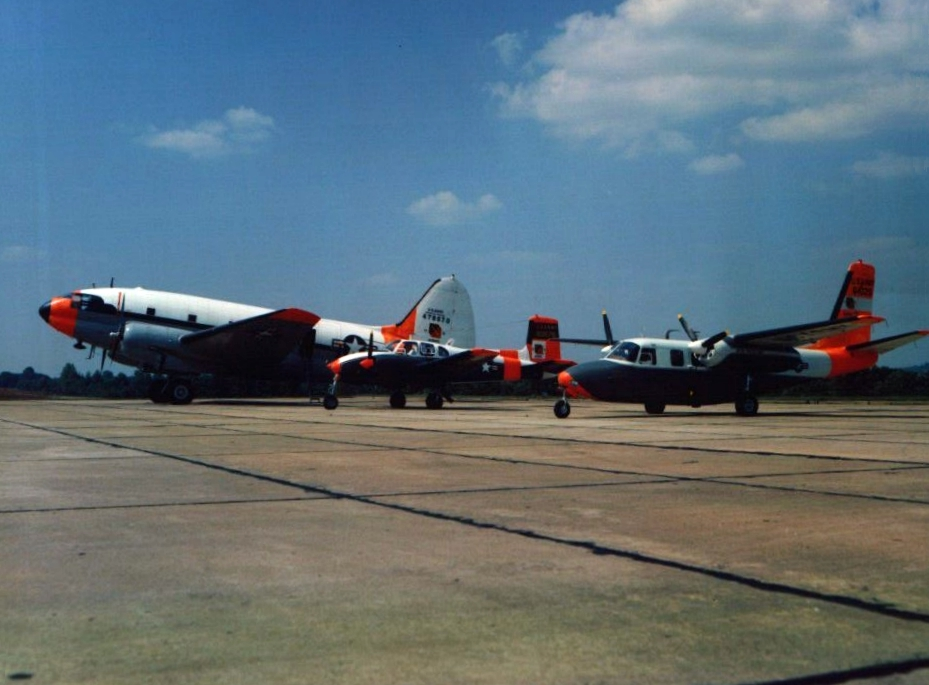
US Army aircraft at Redstone Army Airfield in the 1950s

In 1943, the airstrip on Huntsville Arsenal was established to assist with the testing of incendiary bomb clusters. The testing was done during the height of World War II and, after the allied victory, was promptly stopped. The airfield was largely vacated, though it continued to serve as a military landing strip.

On April 12, 1956, the city of Huntsville approached the commander of the U.S. Army Ballistic Missile Agency to talk about a new federal airway. It was decided that a control tower would be established at Redstone AAF and it would serve as the control tower for military and commercial flights until a new Huntsville Airport was built. After the establishment of the control tower, the control tower of Memphis, Tennessee agreed to handle air traffic for Huntsville through the Redstone Control Tower. The airstrip operated 24 hours a day, seven days a week from July 1956 until November 1969, when it was changed to its current schedule of 13 hours a day, five days a week.

== See also ==
- Redstone Arsenal
