= Kuha (Internet meme) =

Finnish internet meme

"Kuha" is a Finnish Internet meme which became popular in 2015. The meme makes use of colloquial Finnish.

An example of the meme shows a picture of a zander (kuha in Finnish) with the head of a varanid, with the text Kuha on varaani mikäs siinä, meaning "The zander is a varanid, so what", the text being a colloquial form of Kunhan on varaa, niin mikäs siinä, meaning "As long as you can afford it, so what". There are also Facebook and Instagram pages for "kuha" memes.
