= Propulsion and Structural Test Facility =

- U.S. National Register of Historic Places
- U.S. National Historic Landmark
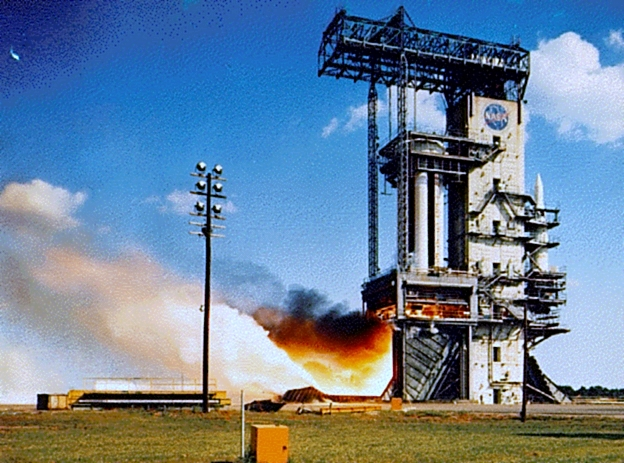
- Propulsion and Structural Test Facility at the George C. Marshall Space Flight Center.

- Location within Huntsville, Alabama Location within Alabama Location within the United States
- Location: Marshall Space Flight Center, Huntsville, Alabama
- Coordinates: 34°37′31.5″N 86°39′30.8″W
- Area: less than one acre
- Built: 1957
- Architect: Heinz Hilten of the U.S. Army
- Demolished: January 10, 2026
- NRHP reference No.: 85002804

Significant dates
- Added to NRHP: October 3, 1985
- Designated NHL: October 3, 1985

The Propulsion and Structural Test Facility, also known as Building 4572 and the Static Test Stand, was a rocket testing facility of the George C. Marshall Space Flight Center in Huntsville, Alabama. Built in 1957, it was the site where the first single-stage rockets with multiple engines were tested. It was declared a National Historic Landmark in 1985 for its role in the development of the United States space program.

Demolition occurred January 10, 2026.

== Description and history ==
Building 4572 is located in the Marshall Space Flight Center's East Test Area. Its frame is of steel, with a concrete foundation and concrete load frame. It is 175 feet (53 m) in height, resting on a base that measures 20 by 30 feet (6.1 m × 9.1 m). It is surrounded by support facilities, and is accompanied by Building 4573, a gantry crane with a capacity of 45 tons. The stand can be configured to either support solid rocket booster testing, or liquid-fueled rockets powered by liquid oxygen or kerosene up to 82 feet (25 m) in height and 22 feet (6.7 m) in diameter.

This facility was built in 1957 by the Army Ballistic Missile Agency and was the primary center responsible for the development of large vehicles and rocket propulsion systems. The Saturn Family of launch vehicles was developed here under the direction of Wernher von Braun. The Saturn V remains the most powerful launch vehicle ever brought to operational status, from a height, weight and payload standpoint. The facility was planned to undergo modifications in the 2010s in anticipation of its use for testing a new generation of rockets.

== See also ==
- List of National Historic Landmarks in Alabama
