= Sanctuary of Artemis Soteira =

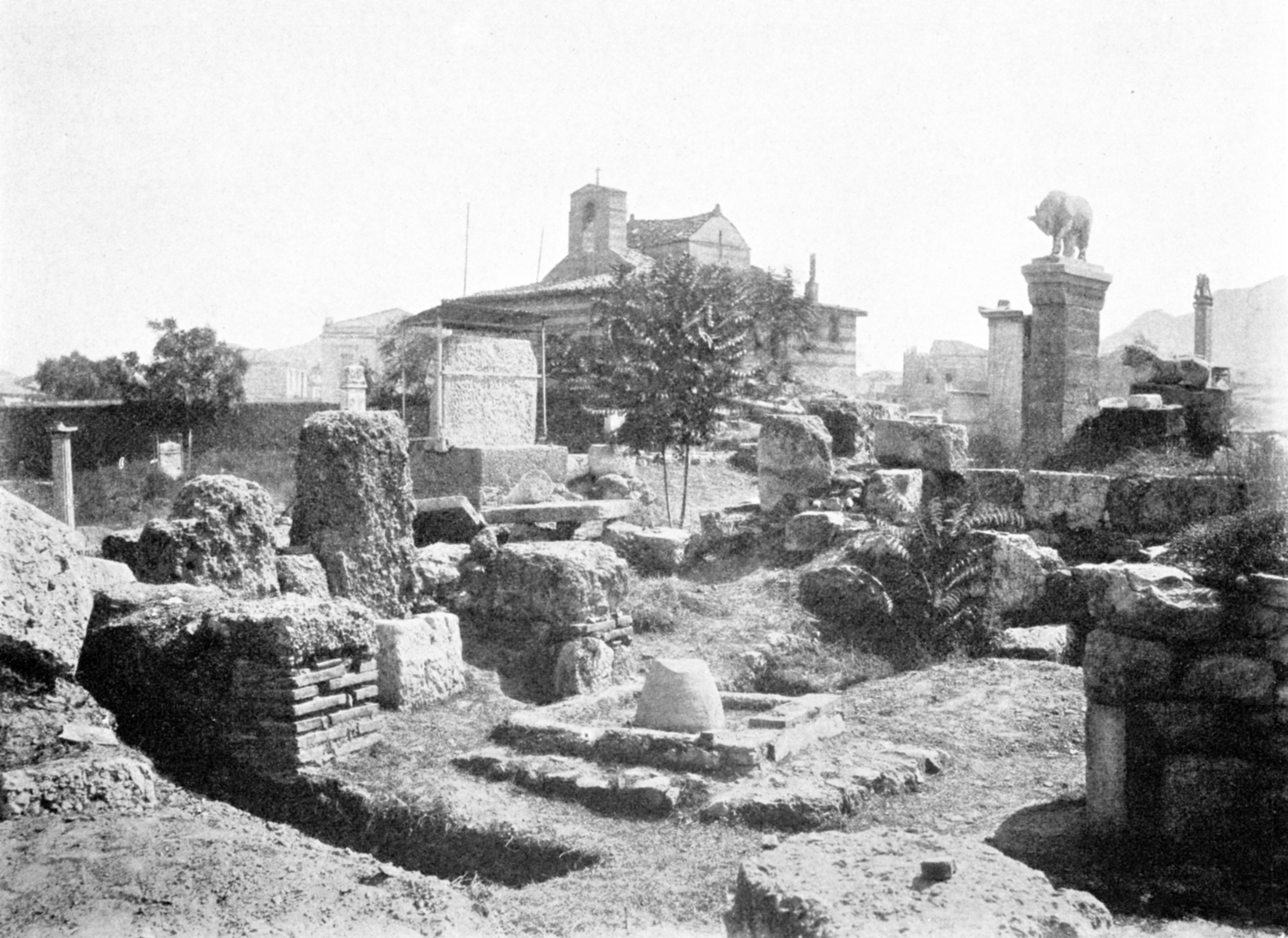
Image of the centre of the sanctuary in 1909. At left, the niche containing the prismatic base; in centre, the Manteion of Paian; at right, the altar

The Sanctuary of Artemis Soteira was an open-air sanctuary in the Kerameikos cemetery in ancient Athens, which was active from the late fourth century BC through to at least the third century AD. It consisted of an altar with attached cult table dedicated to Artemis Soteira, a cult statue mounted in a prismatic niche, a prophetic well dedicated to Paian, a well, relief dedications, and perhaps a sundial. It was discovered in 1890 and was identified as a Hecateion (sanctuary of Hecate).

== Description ==
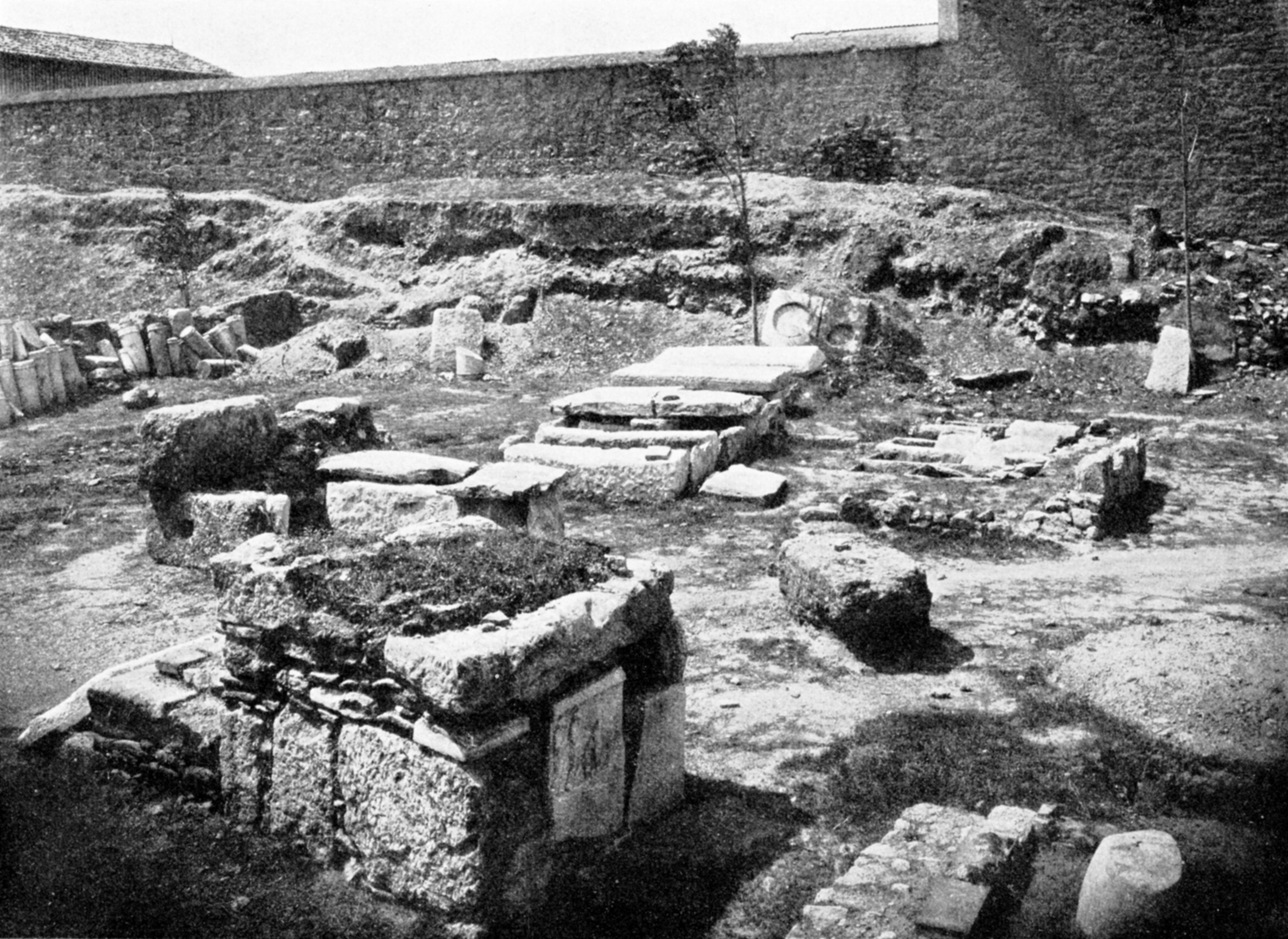
View of the altar from the northeast in 1909, with the Manteion of Paian visible at bottom right.

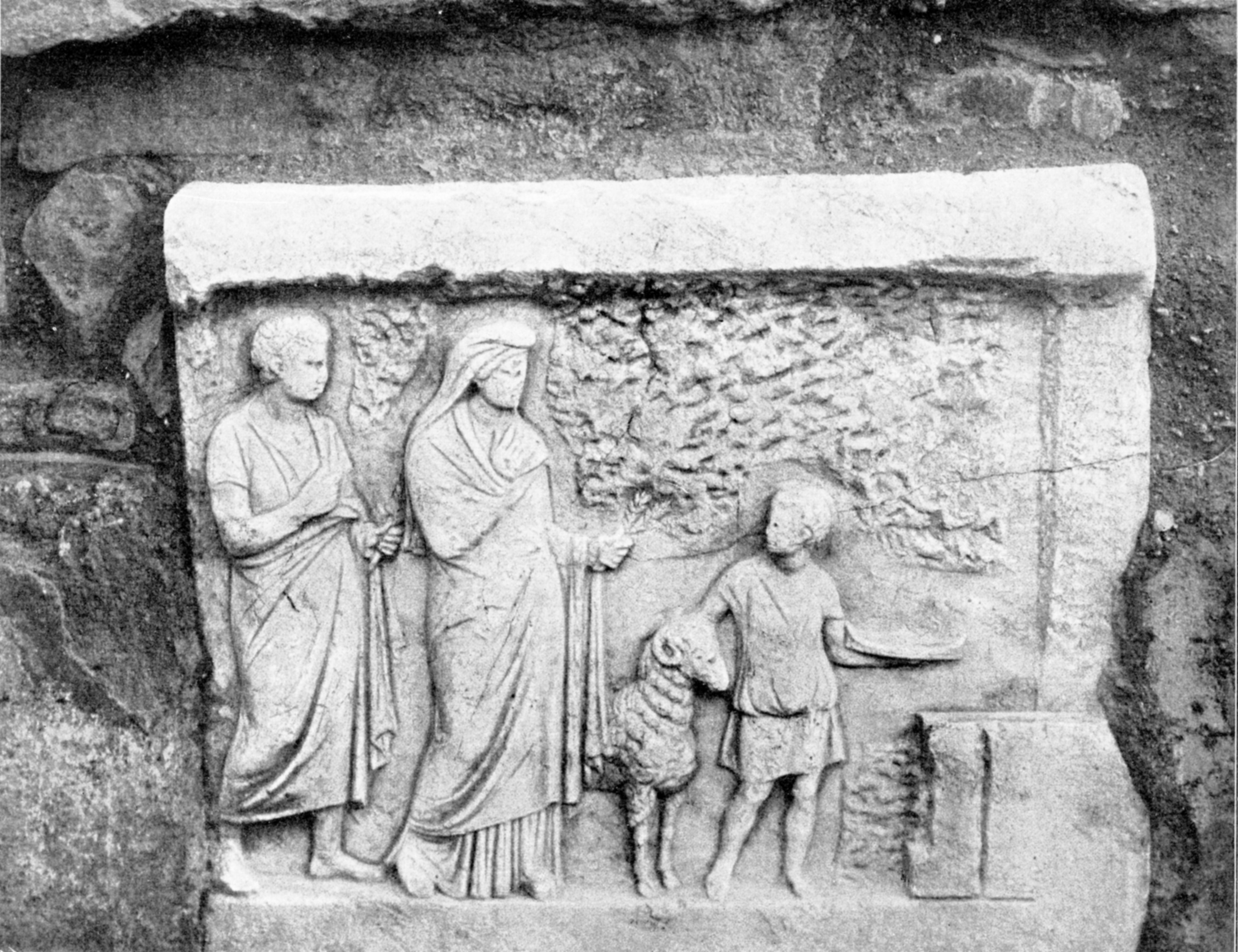
Detail of the votive relief for Bendis, reused in the altar of Artemis Soteira.

The sanctuary is located in the Kerameikos cemetery of ancient Athens. To the north are the funerary precincts (periboloi) of Cephisodorus, Lysimachides, and South 3, which are themselves on the south side of the Street of the Tombs. Through the fourth century BC, this area was occupied by pottery workshops. To the south, there is a rise, which was an industrial area in the Classical period and the site of further funerary precincts in the Hellenistic Age. It is now occupied by the Kerameikos Archaeological Museum.

The sanctuary is an open-air precinct of irregular shape, surrounded by walls. The surviving portions of the walls are the stone foundation layers, which were probably surmounted by a superstructure of baked mudbrick, covered over with stucco. Most of the walls on the north side are the pre-existing walls of the funerary precincts of Lysimachides and Cephisodotus, which were built between 338 and 307 BC. Walls 2-3, however, seem to have been built at the time of the establishment of the sanctuary, and reduced the size of the South 3 funerary precinct. This seems to have occurred ca. 300 BC. The southern walls were built sometime in the third century BC, after the area to the south started to be used for burials.

Roughly speaking, the area consists of three rectangles. The rectangle formed by walls 3-5 which extends to north, contains the main structures of the sanctuary and an entrance in the north wall (reached by crossing the precinct of Lysimachides). A second rectangle extending to the west is formed by walls 6–8. A much larger rectangle, extending east and south, is formed by walls 1-2 and 9–10. It cuts into (and thus post-dates) a large section of funerary precinct "South 3". It contained Well B and the Hydriaphorus stele. There was another entranceway in its southwest corner.

=== Altar and cult statue ===
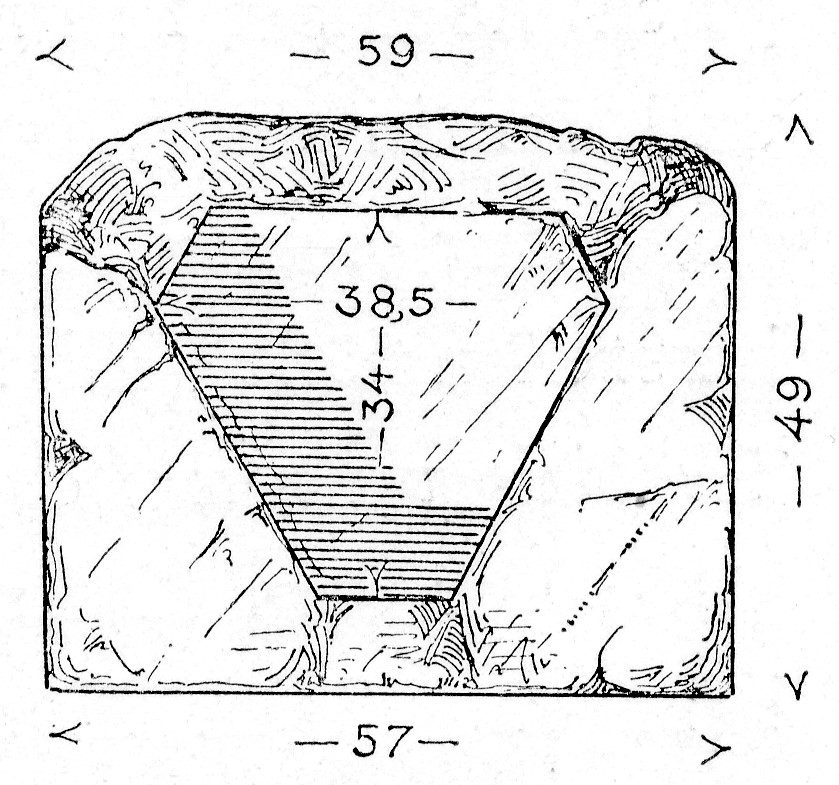
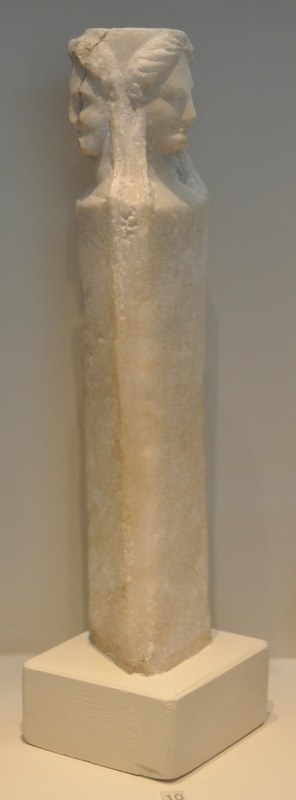
Left: Plan of the prismatic base from above, Adolf Struck. Right: Example of a primsatic column, from Pella. The cult statue of the sanctuary of Artemis Soteira likely resembled this.

The core ritual structures were located in the northern part of the sanctuary. The altar, which was used for animal sacrifice, is a north-south oriented structure, 1.7 m from east-west, 1.85 m from north-south, and 1.64 metres high. was The surviving structure is built of a combination of rubble, stone, brick, and spoliated objects, which was covered over by a layer of stucco. It dates to the Hellenistic period, with Roman-period repairs. The interior of the structure is composed of ash, perhaps the remains of an earlier ash altar. On the south side, there is a three-stepped structure. A third-century BC orthostate block has been reused as the upper surface for an offering table, used for offerings of cakes, fruit, and/or vegetables. This probably occurred in the second or third centuries and a dedicatory inscription attributes the work to one Maron. Embedded in the north side of the altar is a fourth-century BC relief plaque, depicting a man and a woman sacrficing to the goddess Bendis. Unlike the rest of the altar, it was never covered over with stucco.

To the north of the altar is a niched structure, embedded in Wall 4, which contained the cult statue. Only the base now survives, a reused stone block taken from the wall of the funerary precinct of Lysimachides. It measures 0.49 metres high, 0.59 metres wide, and 0.49 metres deep. The upper part has been smoothed, the lower part has been left rough. On top there is a cutting for the lost statue, in the shape of a triangle with the corners cut off. This indicates that the statue was a prismatic column, probably with a female face on each of the three longest sides. Such columns are attested elsewhere for Artemis and Hecate.

=== Manteion of Paian ===
Between the altar and the cult statue is an 8 m deep shaft, lined with 3rd-century AD tiles, each of which is inscribed with an invocation to the god Paian (usually identified with Apollo), "come to me Paian, bearing the true prophecy," which indicates that the structure had an oracular function. This may have served as a well, but it is unclear whether it reached the water table. On top there is a square marble plaque with a round hole in the centre. Very soon after construction, a marble stone in the shape of an omphalus was placed on top of this hole and covered over with stucco, completely sealing the shaft.

=== Well B and the hydriaphorus stele ===
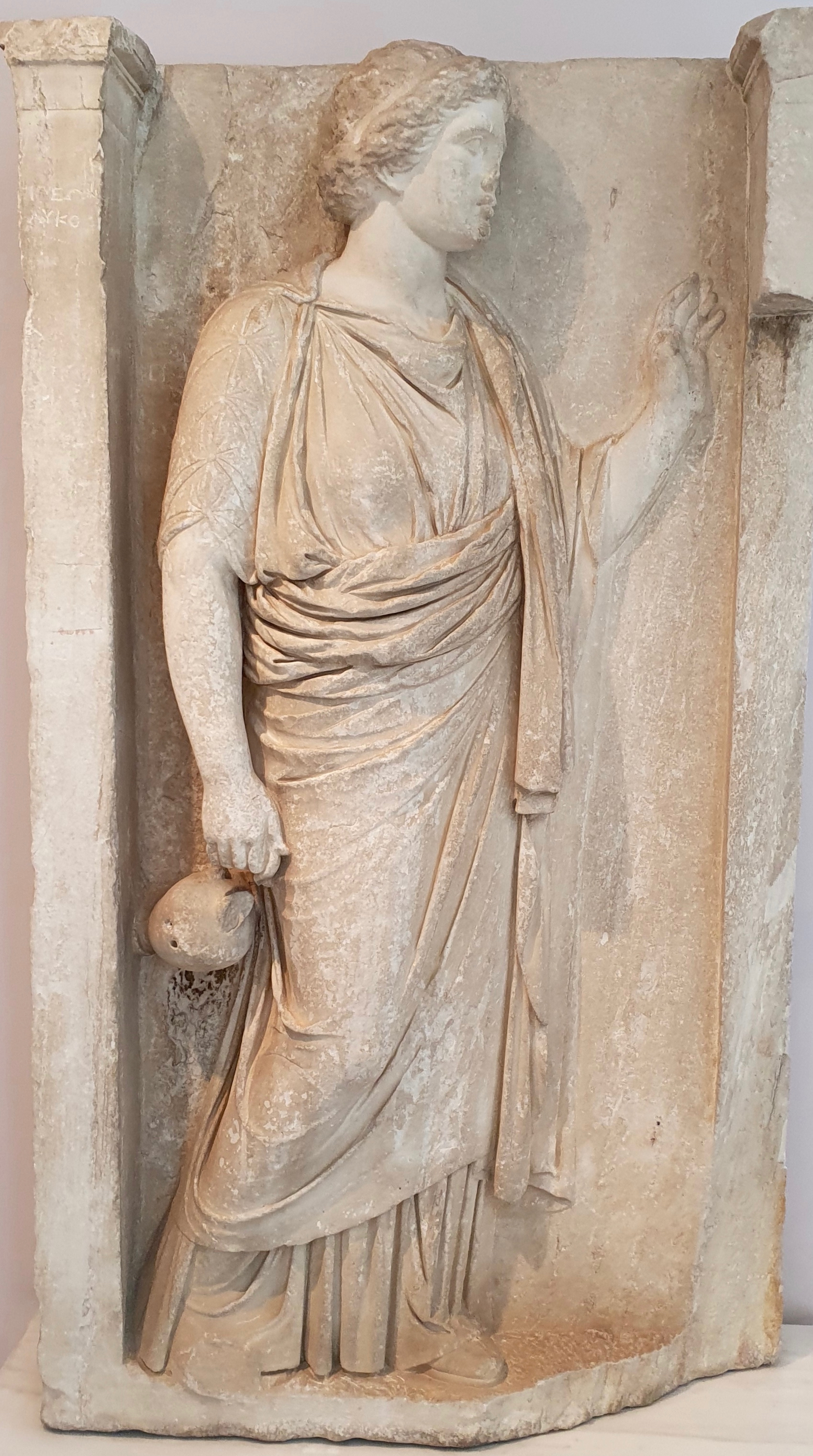
Hydiraphorus stele (Kerameikos P 1131).

Southeast of the main ritual structures is Well B, which was originally cut into the bed rock and lined with wood. It was topped by a blue poros block measuring 1.29 x 1.29 metres and 0.55 m high. In the centre is a funnel with a diameter of 0.55 metres. It was originally dug in the fifth century BC, probably to serve the workshops in the area at the time. Once the area became a sanctuary, it was likely used to supply water for the sacrifices. A drain running north from the well was built in the 130s AD using spoliated stelae.

North of the well, embedded in Wall 2, is the Hydriaphorus relief (inv. P 1131). This was originally a fourth-century BC funerary naiskos, depicting a woman facing right holding a water jug behind herself in her right hand. This was originally an oenochoe, but at a later date (probably when it was inserted into Wall 2)it was remodelled into a small hydria (used for fetching water from wells), thus creating an iconographic link with well B. It is 1.79 m high, 1.045 m wide, and 0.17 m thick.

=== Cylindrical limestone block ===
Directly south of the altar, embedded in the corner of walls 8 and 9, is a pile of earth topped by a stone block measuring 0.61 metres high, 1.24 metres wide, and 0.91 metres thick, with a north-south groove in the shape of a parabola on top. Constanze Graml proposes that this is a sundial, although there are no close parallels for its shape or for the presence of a sundial within a sanctuary. This interpretation has been challenged by Karlheinz Schaldach.

== Discovery and investigation ==
The sanctuary was discovered in 1890 by Kyriakos Mylonas during his excavations of the Kerameikos cemetery and identified by him as a sanctuary of Hecate on the basis of the prismatic base. The finds from this period of the excavation were deposited in the National Archaeological Museum and are no longer identifiable. Camillo Praschniker and K. Rhomaios carried out a further sondage of the site in 1910. Alfred Brueckner carried out further work as part of his wider excavations in the Kerameikos between 1907 and 1915. It was during this period that the inscriptions referring to Artemis Soteira and the association of the Soteriasts was discovered, but they were assumed to derive from the Sanctuary of Ariste and Kalliste, which was known from Pausanias (it was discovered in 1922). Brueckner and Hubert Knackfuß carried out restoration works to the walls of the sanctuary in 1910 to prepare the site for visitors. No detailed records of this work survive and, as a result, restored sections can now only be distinguished from the ancient remains with difficulty. Finds from this period were stored in boxes in the Kermeikos Archaeological Museum. Unfortunately, these have becoming mixed in with finds from other parts of the Kerameikos. Another round of restorations took place between 1956 and 1961, when the site director was Dieter Ohly. The first set of inventories of finds from the site were produced at this time by Judith Binder. When Jutta Stroszeck became site director in 2012, she undertook further cleaning and restoration of the sanctuary and then, in 2015, new excavations, which led to the discovery of the Manteion of Paian.

== Bibliography ==
- Graml, Constanze (2020). The sanctuary of Artemis Soteira in the Kerameikos of Athens. Wiesbaden: Harrassowitz Verlag. ISBN 9783447112864.
