= Pernice (surname) =

Pernice (Italian pronunciation: [perˈniːtʃe]) is an Italian surname meaning "partridge".

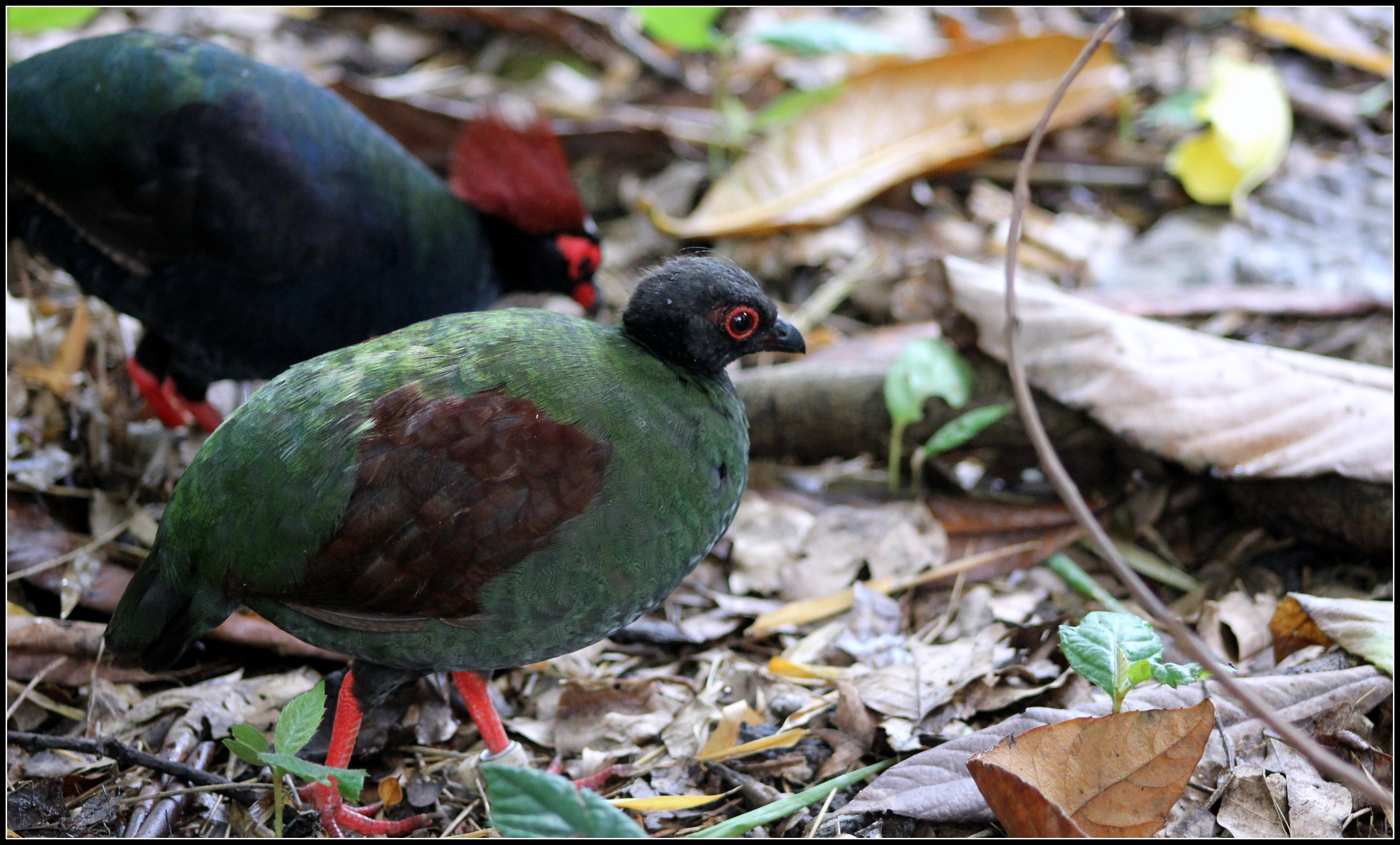
a partridge

Notable people with this surname include:

- Erich Pernice (1864–1945), German classical archaeologist
- Gino Pernice (1927–1997), Italian stage, television and film actor
- Giovanni Pernice (born 1990), Italian dancer and choreographer
- Hugo Karl Anton Pernice (1829–1901), German gynecologist
- Joe Pernice (born 1967), American musician
- Tom Pernice Jr. (born 1959), American golfer
