= Greifswalder Oie =

Island in the Baltic Sea

Coordinates: 54°15′N 13°55′E

Nickname: Heligoland of the Baltic
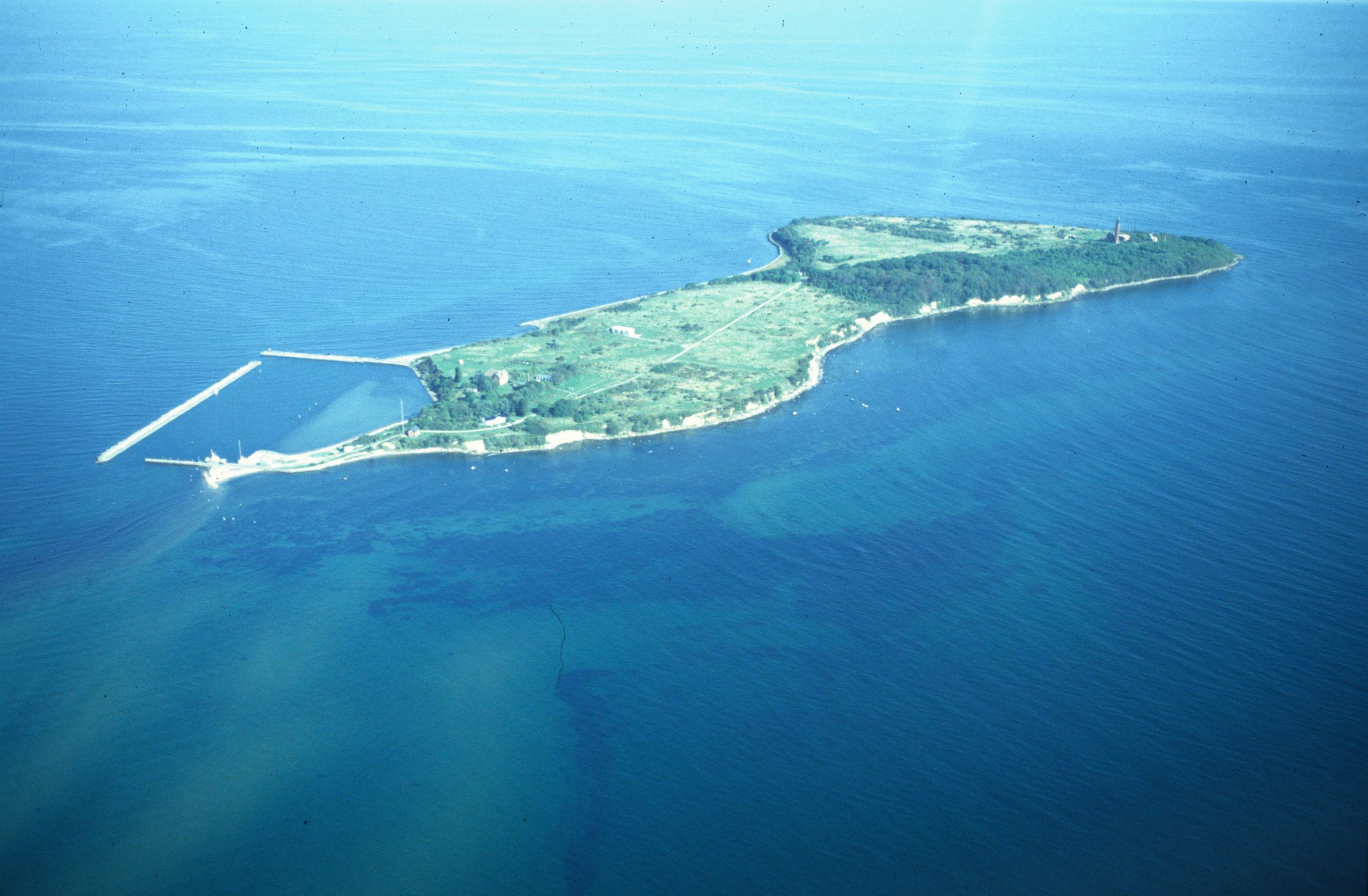
- Greifswalder Oie from above

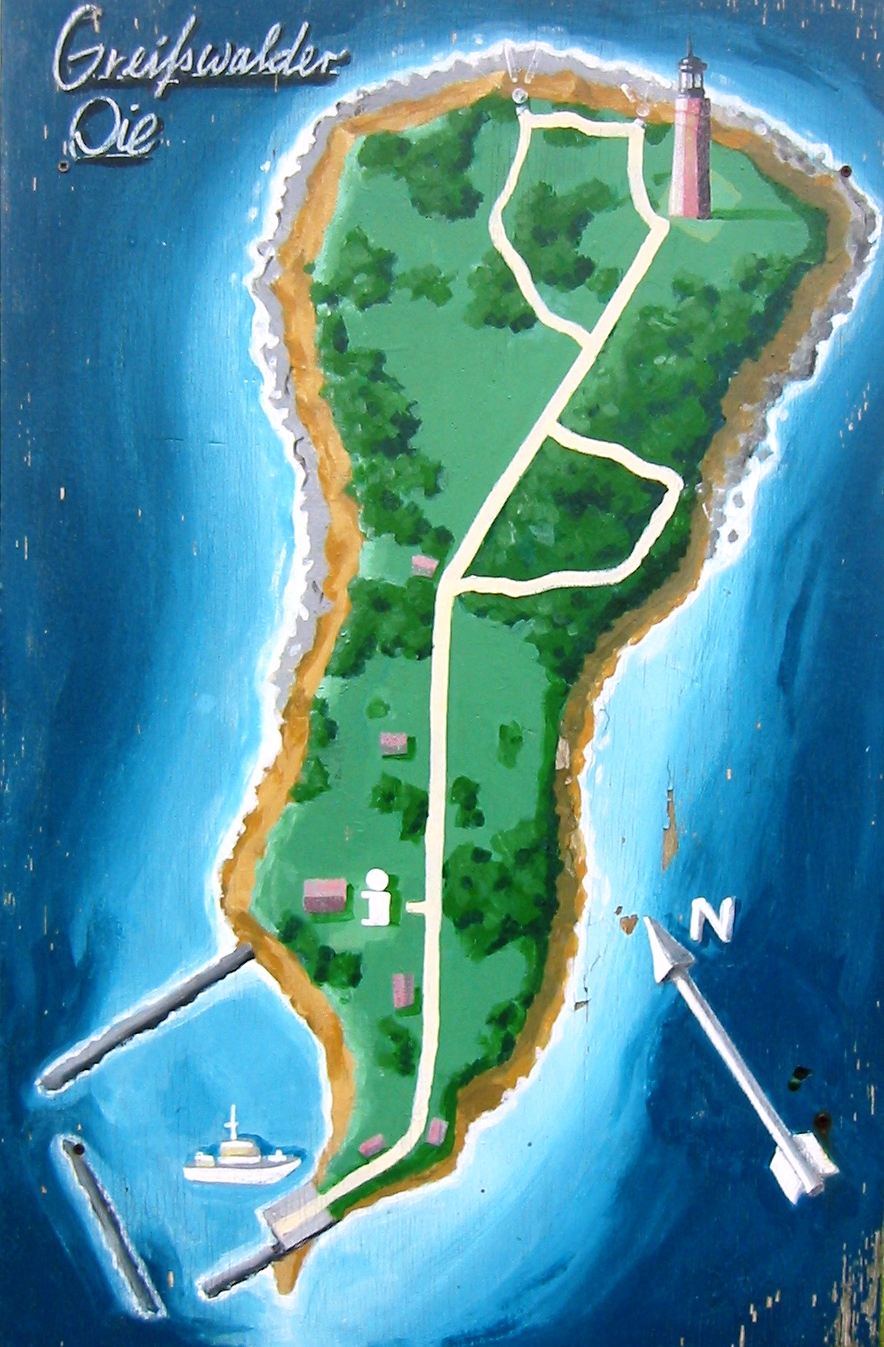
- Detailed map/plan of the island

Geography
- Location: Baltic Sea
- Area: 54 ha (130 acres)
- Length: 1,500 m (4900 ft)
- Width: 24–570 m (79–1,870 ft)

Administration
- Germany
- Mecklenburg-Vorpommern

Demographics
- Population: 0

Additional information
- Time zone: CET (UTC+1)

Greifswalder Oie (literally "Greifswald's isle") is a small island in the Baltic Sea, located east of Rügen and north of Usedom on the German coast. The island covers an area of about 54 hectares. The isle forms part of the municipality of Kröslin.

== Geography ==
The Greifswalder Oie is about 1,550 metres long, a maximum of 570 metres wide and, at the cliffs on its eastern side, a maximum of 19 metres high. It is about 12 kilometres off the shore of Usedom and belongs administratively to the municipality of Kröslin on the mainland. On the island, with its striking steep coast, is a 49 metre high lighthouse with one of the strongest beacons in the Baltic. The whole island is a nature reserve.

It was formed during the last ice age, the Weichselian glaciation, by several glacial depositions from Scandinavia. On the Oie a total of three different deposition phases are evident, so that rocks originating in different parts of Scandinavia may be found on the island.

== History ==
The island was first mentioned in 1282, under the name "Swante Wostroe" (Holy island) and given its modern name by 1608, referencing the city of Greifswald, which owned the isle at the time. The island was then sold to Wolgast in 1291, which had to sell it later due to not being able to pay off its debts. In 1527 the island was let to Councillor Henning Oldhaver who used it as a base to fish from, yet the island remained uninhabited, only featuring a seasonally occupied fishing hut. In the mid-17th century, the city of Greifswald let the island to the Swedish Marshal Carl Gustaf Wrangel who planned to make the island into a hunting resort and thus introduced various wild animals to the island; scrapping the plan when the animals ran out. By the end of the 17th-century settlement on the island commenced for the first time, inhabiting the island were a few farmers who lived off of agriculture on the island. During the Great Northern War around 300 Danish soldiers occupied the island and relied on the reserves and produce of the few farmers that lived on the island at the time, depleting them. In 1749 Greifswald ended the lease of Wrangel and transferred the buildings that were at the time present on the island to the ownership of the peasants.

By 1850 three families that let the island from the city permanently settled on the island and lived from fishing as well as farming. Between 1853 and 1855 the architect Hermann Kirchhoff constructed a lighthouse on the island. In 1865 the island had 41 residents. Between 1873 and 1877 a fishing harbor was built on the island which also assisted fishermen nearby that were in maritime emergency. In 1883 the island was sold to the Prussian state by Greifswald as the city could not longer afford to keep the lighthouse and the emergency rescue operations running. The island was used by tourists and became a popular spot for vacationing, and especially swimming, between 1877 and 1937. Tourists were brought to and from the island with a steam-powered ferry that serviced the location multiple times a day.

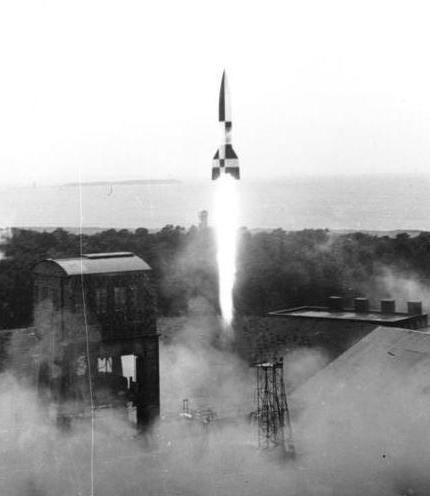
A V-2 rocket test on the island during WWII.

After World War I, only one family remained on the island, that of Fritz Halliger who lived a natural and self-sustaining life with his children, who he himself educated. In 1928 he built a pension and restaurant on the island to service the guests to the island. Many prominent people, such as Asta Nielsen and Thomas Mann, visited the island during this time and it became the backdrop to the 1932 movie F.P.1.

Around 1929, Johannes Winkler experimented with small LOX methane rockets on the island. Under Nazi-leadership the island fell under the jurisdiction of the Wehrmacht which declared it a military exclusion zone, something it would stay until 1991. Fritz Halliger and his family were forced to leave the island in 1937 and settled in northern Rügen. Between 1937 and 1945, the island was used as a rocket testing site, most notably of the A3, A4 and A5 rockets. See also: List of V-2 test launches. In an operation designated Lighthouse, Wernher von Braun oversaw attempts to launch A3 rockets in December 1937, each of which failed. Between 1938 and 1942, the island was the scene for the nearly successful launches of the A5 rockets. Also twenty-eight A4/V2 rockets were launched vertically from Greifswalder Oie between 1943 and 1945. These launches were made in order to observe the reentrance of the rockets into the atmosphere.

By the end of World War II the Red Army dismantled most of the rocketry infrastructure, leaving in the early 1950s to make way for the GDR Navy which permitted tourists to visit the island until 1957. Later, the 6th Border Brigade of the GDR Border Troops was stationed on the island with 25 to 30 men. During these times the island's beekeepery was established by the VEB Forschungsstelle für Bienenwirtschaft.

== Current situation ==
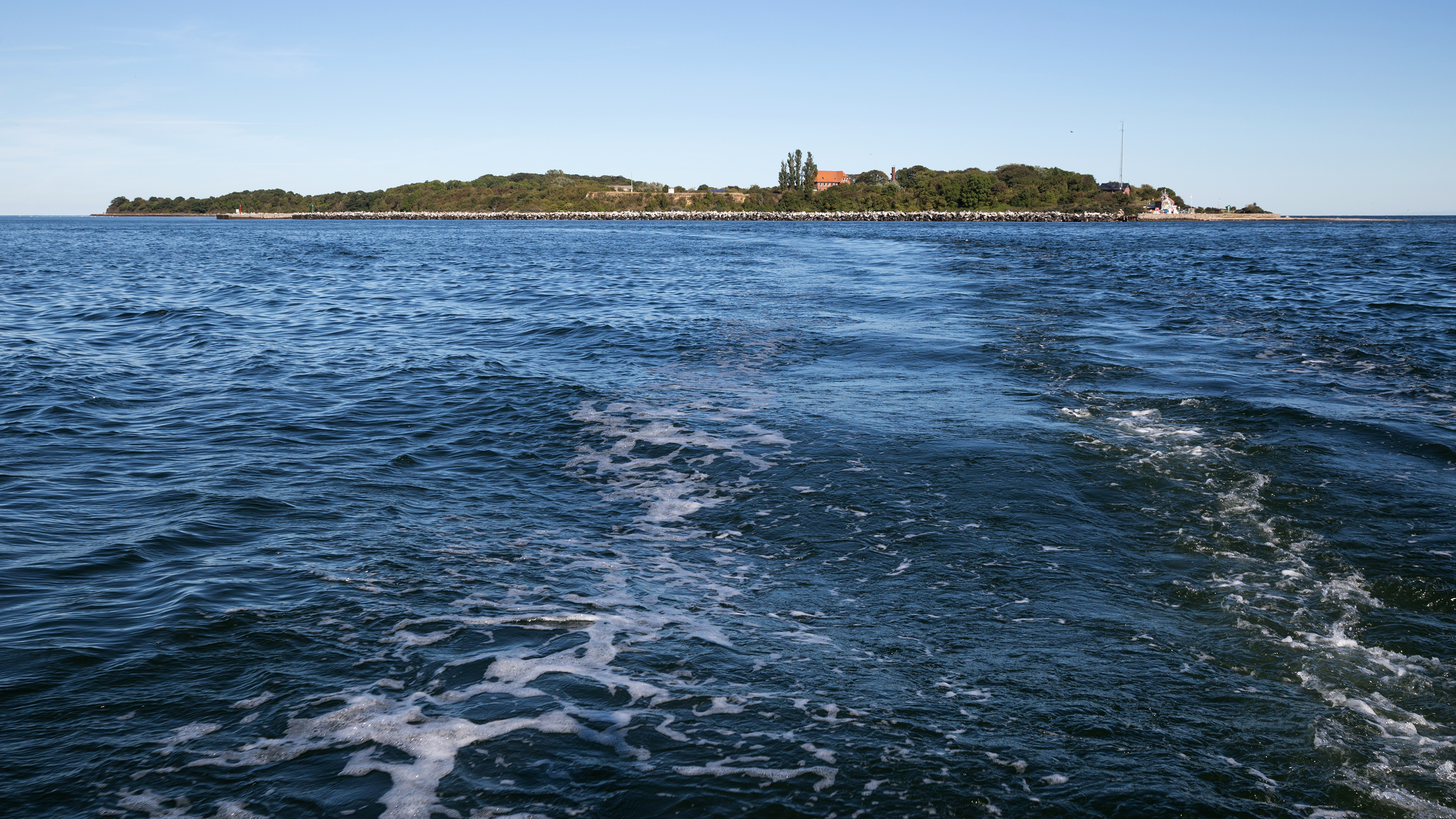
Greifswalder Oie, 2016

As of the 2000s, the islet is an uninhabited sea bird reserve, save for a single man who works the light house, manages the small emergency yacht harbour (depth ca. 1.6m / 6 ft), and creates outdoor art objects that he scatters along a path that circles the island. There is an infrequent ferry service from Peenemünde and Karlshagen.

== Climate ==
Climate data for Greifswalder Oie (1991–2020 normals)
Month	Jan	Feb	Mar	Apr	May	Jun	Jul	Aug	Sep	Oct	Nov	Dec	Year
Mean daily maximum °C (°F)	2.8 (37.0)	3.0 (37.4)	5.6 (42.1)	10.1 (50.2)	14.8 (58.6)	18.8 (65.8)	21.3 (70.3)	21.4 (70.5)	18.0 (64.4)	12.8 (55.0)	8.0 (46.4)	4.5 (40.1)	11.8 (53.2)
Daily mean °C (°F)	1.3 (34.3)	1.5 (34.7)	3.5 (38.3)	7.3 (45.1)	12.0 (53.6)	15.9 (60.6)	18.5 (65.3)	18.7 (65.7)	15.7 (60.3)	10.9 (51.6)	6.4 (43.5)	3.0 (37.4)	9.5 (49.1)
Mean daily minimum °C (°F)	−0.3 (31.5)	−0.1 (31.8)	1.6 (34.9)	5.3 (41.5)	9.7 (49.5)	13.6 (56.5)	16.2 (61.2)	16.5 (61.7)	13.7 (56.7)	9.2 (48.6)	5.0 (41.0)	1.5 (34.7)	7.7 (45.9)
Average precipitation mm (inches)	42.6 (1.68)	30.3 (1.19)	32.5 (1.28)	25.0 (0.98)	45.0 (1.77)	54.0 (2.13)	69.3 (2.73)	55.4 (2.18)	48.5 (1.91)	43.8 (1.72)	44.8 (1.76)	47.5 (1.87)	552.4 (21.75)
Average precipitation days (≥ 1.0 mm)	17.6	14.5	13.1	10.2	12.5	12.8	13.8	13.7	11.5	15.7	16.2	18.4	172.9
Average relative humidity (%)	87.2	86.1	84.3	81.4	79.0	78.6	78.2	78.1	78.4	83.1	86.3	88.1	82.4
Mean monthly sunshine hours	47.2	73.2	141.9	232.1	276.2	276.1	274.4	241.8	187.9	120.5	57.4	33.6	1,993.5
Source: World Meteorological Organization
