= Pernice =

Pernice may refer to:

- Pernice (surname), Italian surname
- Pernice Brothers, American indie rock band
- Pernice, Muta, Slovenia
