= Erich Pernice =

German archaeologist

Erich Pernice (19 December 1864, Greifswald – 1 August 1945, Freest) was a German classical archaeologist. He was the son of the gynecologist Hugo Karl Anton Pernice (1829–1945).

He studied classical philology in Berlin, and classical languages, history and archaeology at the University of Bonn, where his instructors included Reinhard Kekulé von Stradonitz and Heinrich Nissen. In 1888, he obtained his PhD with a dissertation titled Galen et de ponderibus mensuris testimonia. Through a travel grant from the Deutschen Archäologischen Instituts (DAI), he participated in the excavation at Kerameikos in Athens. In 1895, he began work at the Antikensammlung Berlin (Antiquarium), subsequently spending several years as a directorial assistant (1897-1903).

In 1903, he was named an associate professor of archaeology and philological auxiliary sciences at the University of Greifswald, later attaining a full professorship (1907) and a directorate of the academic art collections. In 1908/09, he took part in two successful excavations at Miletus. In 1912, he was instrumental towards the founding of the "Pompeii project", a project that is still continued by the DAI today. In the field of metrology, he conducted research of ancient weights. After retirement in 1933, he continued to give lectures at Greifswald until 1940.

== Selected works ==
He was responsible for continuation of the series Hellenistische Kunst in Pompeji (Hellenistic art in Pompeii), a multi-volume project begun by Franz Winter. He also made important contributions as an editor to Wilhelm Lübke's Die Kunst des Altertums and to Georg Lehnert's Illustrierte geschichte des Kunstgewerbes (1907–09). In Gercke and Norden's Einleitung in die Altertumswissenschaft, he was the author of the section on Greek and Roman private life, titled "Griechisches und römisches Privatleben". Other noteworthy works by Pernice include:

- Ein Attischer Friedhof, (with Alfred Brueckner) 1893 – An Attican cemetery.
- Griechisches pferdegeschirr im Antiquarium der Königlichen Museen, 1896 – Greek horse harnesses at the Antiquarium in the Royal Museum.
- Hellenistische silbergefässe im Antiquarium der Königlichen Museen, 1898 – Hellenistic silver vessels at the Antiquarium in the Royal Museum.
- Der Hildesheimer silberfund (with Franz Winter), 1901 – The Hildesheim silver trove.
- Gefässe und Geräte aus Bronze, 1925 – Bronze vessels and implements.
- Pompeji, 1926.
- Pavimente und Figürliche mosaiken, 1928; In: Hellenistische Kunst in Pompeii, Bd. 6. – Pavements and figurative mosaics.
- Hellenistische Tische, Zisternenmündungen, Beckenuntersätze, Altäre und Truhen, 1932; In: Hellenistische Kunst in Pompeji, Bd. 5. – Hellenistic tables, cistern mouths, pedestals, altars and chests.

Pernice promoted regional archaeology (Western Pomerania) via establishment of the Mitteilungen aus der Sammlung Vaterländischer Altertümer.
