= Operation Lighthouse (1937) =

Failed experimental rocket launch

Operation Lighthouse was the name given to the failed experimental launch of four Aggregate 3 liquid-fuel rockets by Wernher von Braun and Walter Dornberger on the German island of Greifswalder Oie in December 1937.

== Background and preparation ==
In the summer of 1937 the German Aggregate 3 series of rockets was nearing the testing stage. Several were tested on a special stand at Kummersdorf in an attempt to evaluate guidance systems. These consisted of vanes designed to deflect the rocket exhaust and control the missile's course. On September 1, Dornberger ordered that von Braun's team prepare for a series of test launches in the first part of November from the small island of Greifswalder Oie in an operation he designated "Lighthouse". Von Braun assigned the head of his measurement unit, Gerhard Reisig, to prepare the expedition to the island.

In November, rain and snow storms kept the project behind schedule, delaying ferries and nearly collapsing the tent erected as a preparation site. Rodents gnawed on tar paper and telephone cables. Amidst the setbacks, Dornberger and von Braun hunted rabbits and pheasants. The rockets and launch site were not ready until December.

== Launches ==
The first launch was ordered for December 2, but again weather and technical problems delayed the operation. On December 4 the first rocket blasted off just after 10 AM. Set on a test ring without a guide rail, the rocket rose vertically for three seconds, but then the parachute deployed and dragged, burning, behind the vehicle. After less than seven seconds the engine cut out and soon the rocket fell back to the ground, landing 1,000 feet (300 meters) from the launch site. It exploded and burned upon impact, leaving little wreckage to examine.

Another missile was launched on the afternoon of December 6 and followed a similar pattern, crashing and exploding in the sea less than twenty feet from the island's cliffs. The wreckage did not yield an explanation for the failure, but the parachute system was suspected.

For the third launch, the parachute was replaced with a flare. The rocket was set off in the afternoon of December 8. The missile turned from the vertical into the wind and after four seconds the flare deployed. At 1,000 feet (300 meters) the engine quit, and without the drag of a burning parachute (like the previous two rockets) it achieved a greater distance before crashing over a mile offshore and exploding in the sea.

Despite the disappointing results of the first three launches, Dornberger and von Braun decided to launch their last A3. After further weather delays, the last rocket was set off on the morning of December 11 but demonstrated a performance much like the third.

== Aftermath ==
The failure the project launch came as a shock to von Braun, who set to trying to find the causes. He suspected both the guidance control system and the jet vanes. Additionally, he developed a theory that an electrostatic charge caused the parachute to deploy early in the first two launches. Tests conducted at Kummersdorf on an electrically insulated rocket seemed to discount this explanation. Instead, von Braun figured that the rocket had rolled upon launch enough to deploy the parachute, which was set to act when the missile rolled more than six degrees per second. Because the missiles tested had not been painted in patterns, it was only upon reviewing photographs that the roll was detected.

Ultimately, the failure of the A3 launches showed the relative lack of experience of von Braun's team and Kreiselgeräte, the company that designed the guidance system. The A3 was essentially abandoned and thoroughly redesigned as the A5. By January 1938 von Braun and Dornberger decided to keep the propulsion, pressurization, and tank systems, but discarded the body and fin design in favor of something that could be better controlled. Additionally, unlike the A3, the A5 would not be designed to carry any scientific instrumentation, but only guidance and control systems.

Furthermore, the failure of the A3 launches held back the development of the A4 (later known as V-2) rocket for at least a year. Von Braun had hoped to launch the world's first ballistic missile by 1940, but the Oie expedition forced this aspiration further into the future.

== Sources ==
- Neufeld, M. J. (2007). Von Braun: Dreamer of Space, Engineer of War. New York: Knopf.
