= Hugo Karl Anton Pernice =

German gynecologist and obstetrician

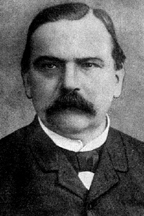
Hugo Karl Anton Pernice

Hugo Karl Anton Pernice (9 November 1829 – 31 December 1901) was a German gynecologist and obstetrician born in Halle an der Saale. He was the son of legal scholar Ludwig Wilhelm Anton Pernice (1799-1861), and the father of classical archaeologist Erich Pernice (1864-1945) and Agnes Ballowitz, nee Pernice, wife of Emil Ballowitz.

Pernice studied at the Universities of Göttingen, Halle, Bonn and Prague. In 1852 he earned his medical doctorate at Halle, where afterwards he remained as an assistant to Anton Friedrich Hohl (1789-1862). In 1858 he became a professor of gynecology and obstetrics at the University of Greifswald, as well as director of the OB/GYN clinic.

He was an instructor and medical practitioner at Greifswald for over 40 years, retiring in 1899. In 1863 he became the first chairman of the Medizinischen Vereins Greifswald (Medical Association of Greifswald).

== Selected publications ==
- Operationum in arte obstetricia examinatio critica et historica (1855)
- Die Geburten mit Vorfall der Extremitäten neben dem Kopfe (1858)
- Ueber den Scheintod Neugeborener und dessen Behandlung mit elektrischen Reizen (1863)

== Literature ==
- Grewolls, Grete (2011). Wer war wer in Mecklenburg und Vorpommern. Das Personenlexikon (in German). Rostock: Hinstorff Verlag. p. 7466. ISBN 978-3-356-01301-6.
