= Kröslin =

- Municipality
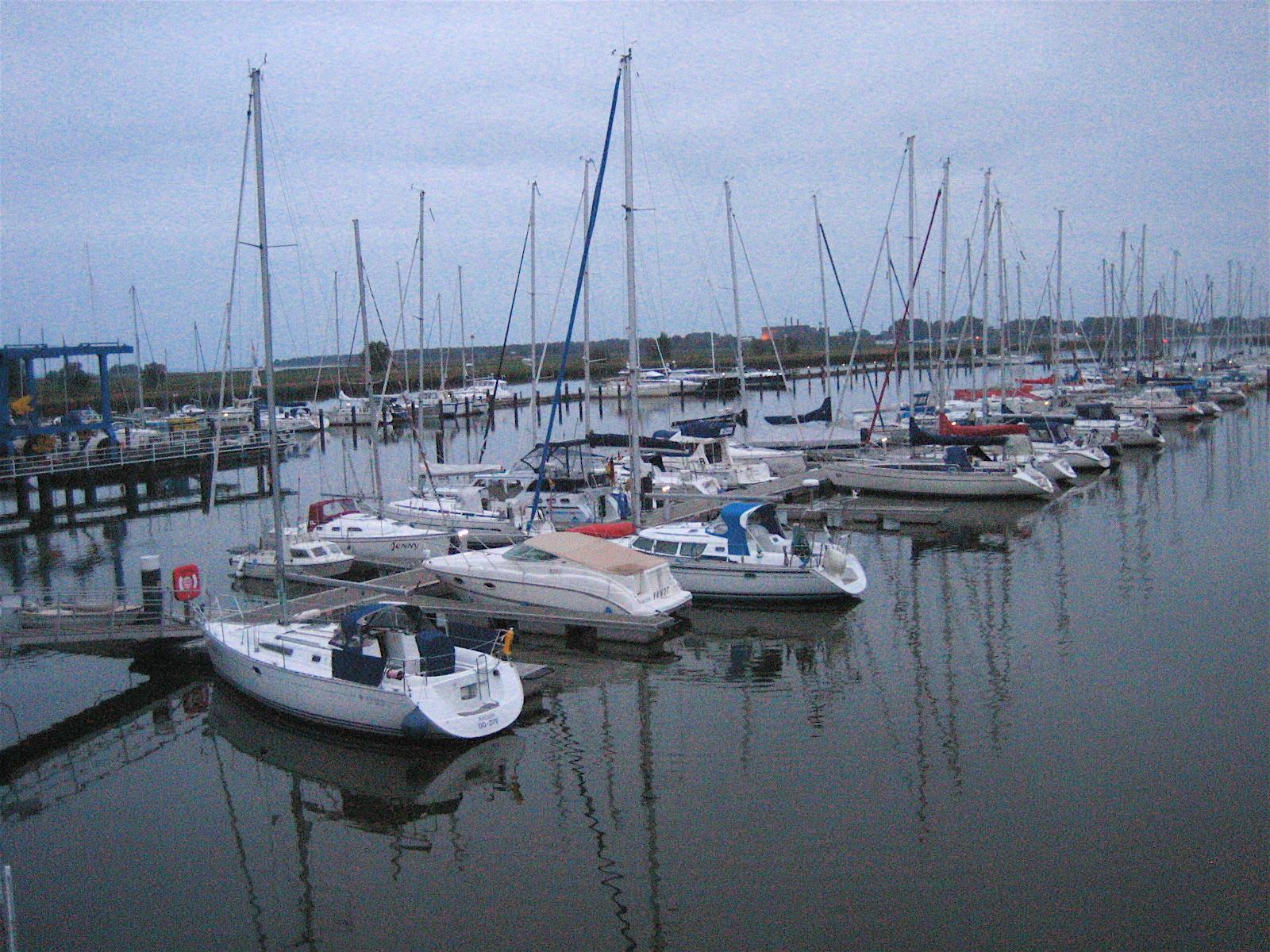
- Marina in Kröslin

- Coat of arms

- Location of Kröslin within Vorpommern-Greifswald district
- Interactive map of Kröslin
- Location within Germany Location within Mecklenburg-Vorpommern
- Coordinates: 54°7′N 13°46′E
- Country: Germany
- State: Mecklenburg-Vorpommern
- District: Vorpommern-Greifswald
- Municipal assoc.: Lubmin
- Subdivisions: 5

Government
  - Mayor: Holger Dinse (CDU)

Area
  - Total: 22.41 km^{2} (8.65 sq mi)
- Elevation: 2 m (6.6 ft)

Population (2025-12-31)
  - Total: 1,715
  - Density: 76.53/km^{2} (198.2/sq mi)
- Time zone: UTC+01:00 (CET)
  - Summer (DST): UTC+02:00 (CEST)
- Postal codes: 17440
- Dialling codes: 038370
- Vehicle registration: VG
- Website: www.kroeslin.de

Kröslin is a municipality in the Vorpommern-Greifswald district, in Mecklenburg-Vorpommern, Germany. It consists of the villages

- Freest
- Hollendorf
- Karrin
- Kröslin
- Spandowerhagen

and the islands

- Greifswalder Oie
- Ruden
- Dänholm
- Großer Wotig
- Kleiner Wotig
- Großer Rohrplan.
