= Aggregat =

Nazi ballistic missile series

The Aggregat series (From the German for "Aggregate" or "Assembly") was a set of ballistic missile designs developed in 1933–1945 by a research program of Nazi Germany's Army (Heer). Its greatest success was the A4, more commonly known as the V2.

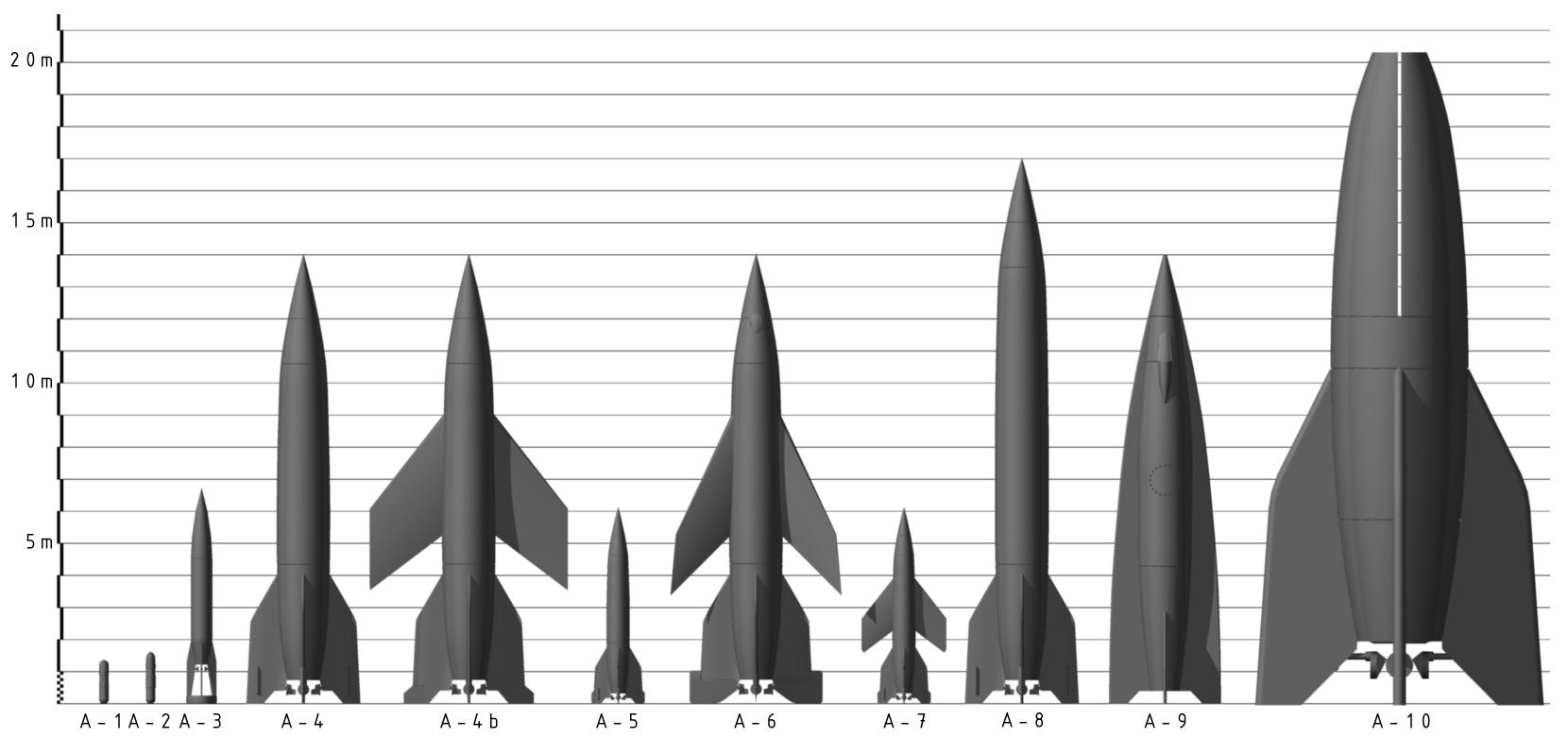
Aggregat rockets compared

== A1 (1933) ==
The A1 was the first rocket design in the Aggregat series. It was designed in 1933 by Wernher von Braun at the German Army research program at Kummersdorf headed by Colonel Dr Walter Dornberger. The A1 was the grandfather of most modern rockets. The rocket was 1.4 metres (4 ft 7 in) long, 30.5 centimetres (12 in) in diameter, and had a takeoff weight of 150 kilograms (330 lb). The engine, designed by Arthur Rudolph, used a pressure-fed rocket propellant system burning ethanol and liquid oxygen, and produced 2.9 kN (660 lbf) of thrust for 16 seconds. The LOX tank was located within the fuel tank and insulated with a fiberglass material. The rocket was stabilized by a 40 kg (88 lb) 3 axes gyroscope system in the nose, supplied by Kreiselgeräte GmbH. The rocket could not be rotated for stability as with a ballistic shell, as centrifugal force would force the liquid fuel to rise up along the walls of their tanks, which made feeding propellants to the combustion chamber difficult. Although the engine had been successfully test fired, the first flight attempt blew up on the launching pad on 21 December 1933, half a second after ignition. The cause was a buildup up of propellants before ignition of its engine. Since the design was thought to be unstable, no further attempts were made, and efforts moved to the A2 design. The A1 was too nose-heavy, and to compensate, the gyroscope system was moved to the middle of the A2, between the oxygen and ethanol tanks.

== A2 (1934) ==
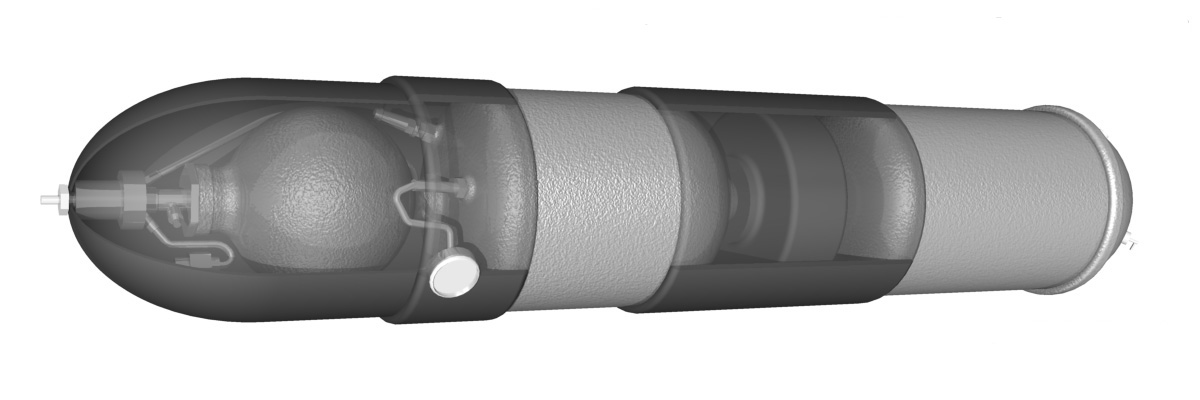
A2 rocket

Static tests and assembly were completed by 1 October 1934. Two A2s were built for a full-out test, and were named after a Wilhelm Busch cartoon, Max and Moritz. On 19 and 20 December 1934, they were launched in front of senior Army officers on Borkum island in the North Sea. They reached altitudes of 2.2 and 3.5 kilometres (1.4 and 2.2 mi). The A2s had the same dimensions as the A1, and the same engine, but separate propellant tanks. The cylindrical regeneratively cooled combustion chamber was welded inside the ethanol tank. The mushroom-shaped injector system consisted of fuel and oxidizer jets pointing at one another. Propellants were pressurized from a nitrogen tank, a system which was also used for the A3 and A5.

== A3 (1935–1937) ==
Development of the A3 can be traced at least to February 1935 when Major Ernst Ritter von Horstig sent General der Artillerie Karl Becker a budget of almost half a million marks for the construction of two new test stands at Kummersdorf. Included were mobile test rigs, small locomotives, and office and storage space. The A3 plans called for a rocket with an inertial guidance system and a 15 kN (3,300 lb) thrust engine.

In March 1936, Generaloberst Werner von Fritsch witnessed a static firing of an A3 engine at Kummersdorf, and was sufficiently impressed to lend his support to the rocket program. Like the earlier A1 and A2 rockets, the A3 used a pressure-fed propellant system, and the same liquid oxygen and 75% ethanol mixture as the earlier designs. It generated its 14.7 kN (3,300 lb) for 45 seconds. It used a three-gyroscope system to deflect tungsten alloy jet vanes. The design was finished in early 1936 and further modifications that made the rocket stable at supersonic velocities were finalized later that year.

The shape of the rocket was based on the 8-mm rifle bullet, in anticipation of supersonic flight. The rocket was 6.7 metres (22 ft) in length, 0.70 metres (2.3 ft) feet in diameter, and weighed 750 kg (1,650 lb) when fueled. Fins were included, for "arrow stability", structurally anchored by an antenna ring. The stabilized platform used a pitch gyro and a yaw gyro, connected to pneumatic servos, which stabilized the platform along the pitch and yaw axes. Electrical carriages on the platform acted as integrating accelerometers. These signals were mixed with those from the SG-33 system, to drive the molybdenum-tungsten jet vane control servomotors. The SG-33 was fixed to the rocket, not the stabilized platform, and used three rate gyros to sense roll, pitch and yaw deviations. Two of the jet vanes rotated in the same direction for pitch and yaw control, and in opposite directions for roll control. The guidance and control system was designed by Fritz Mueller, based on Johannes Maria Boykow's ideas, the technical director of Kreiselgeräte GmbH ("Gyro Instruments Limited").

The A3 engine was a scaled-up version of the A2, but with a mushroom-shaped injector at the top of the combustion chamber, based on a design by Walter Riedel. Ethanol was sprayed upwards to mix with the oxygen sprayed downward from jets at the top of the chamber. This increased efficiency and generated higher temperatures.

This was the first of the Aggregat rockets to be launched from the Peenemünde area. As part of Operation Lighthouse the first A3 was launched on 4 December 1937, but suffered problems with premature parachute deployment and engine failure, and crashed close to the takeoff point. The second launch on 6 December 1937 suffered similar problems. The parachute was disabled in the third and fourth rockets launched on 8 and 11 December 1937, but these, too, experienced engine failures, though the lack of parachute drag allowed them to crash further from the launch site. They reached altitudes between 760 and 910 metres (2,500 and 3,000 ft), before falling into the sea.

According to another source, one A3 reached a maximum downrange of 12 km (7.5 mi) and maximum altitude of 18 km (11 mi).

With each launch a failure, von Braun and Dornberger looked for the cause. At first there was some thought of an electrostatic charge that prematurely set off the parachute, but this was largely disproved. Ultimately, the failures were attributed to the inadequate design of the rocket's experimental inertial guidance system and minor instabilities in the body and fin design. The control system was found to be unable to keep the rocket from turning with a wind greater than 3.7 metres per second (12 ft/s). The stable platform gyros were limited to a 30 degree range of motion, and when the platform tumbled, the parachutes deployed. The jet vanes needed to move faster, and have a larger control force, to stop the rolling. The fins were redesigned in the A5, when it was realized an expanding jet plume as the rocket gained altitude, would have destroyed the A3 fin stabilizing antenna ring.

After this unsuccessful series of launches, the A3 was abandoned and A4 work postponed, while work on the A5 commenced.

According to Dornberger, the A3 "...had not been equipped to take any payload. It was a purely experimental missile." Similarly, the A5 was to be "for research purposes only."

=== Specifications ===
Length: 6.74 m (22 ft 1 in)
Diameter: 0.68 m (2 ft 3 in)
Finspan: 0.93 m (3 ft 1 in)
Launch mass: 748 kg (1,649 lb)
Fuel: Ethanol and liquid oxygen
Liftoff thrust: 14.7 kN

== A5 (1938–1942) ==
The A5 played a vital role in testing the aerodynamics and technology of the A4. Its rocket motor was identical to the A3, but with a new control system provided by Siemens, was 5.825 m (19.11 ft) long, with a diameter of 0.78 m (2.6 ft) and a takeoff weight of 900 kg (2,000 lb). The A5 was fitted with a Brennschluss receiving set, a parachute recovery system, could stay afloat in water for up to two hours, and was painted yellow and red, aiding recovery. New tail surfaces were tested in the Zeppelin Aircraft Works subsonic tunnel and the supersonic tunnel in Aachen. The internal vanes were now made of graphite instead of molybdenum. Uncontrolled A5s were launched from Griefswalder Oie in late 1938. Models that were 1.5 meters (5 ft) long and 20 centimeters (8 in) in diameter were dropped from Heinkel He 111s starting in September 1938, testing supersonic speeds in the absence of a supersonic wind tunnel. Hellmuth Walter also made models of the A5m which included a hydrogen peroxide motor, with potassium permanganate as a catalyst, and were test launched in March 1939. The final fin configuration was wider, curved outward to accommodate the expanding exhaust gases, included external air vanes, but no ring antenna.

The A5, like the A3, was fueled with ethanol with liquid oxygen as an oxidant. The first successful guided flights were made in October 1939, with three of the first four flights using a Kreiselgeräte complete guidance and control system called SG-52. This used a 3-gyro stabilized platform for attitude control and a tilt program, whose signals were mixed with rate gyros, and fed to a control system connected to the jet vanes by aluminium rods. The Siemens Vertikant control system first flew on 24 April 1940. The Siemens system used three gyros, particularly 3 rate gyros providing stabilization, and hydraulic servomotors to move the jet vanes to correct pitch and yaw, and control roll. The Möller Askania, or Rechlin system, first flew on 30 April 1940, and used position gyros, a mixing system and a servo system. A5 testing included a guide plane system for lateral control, and a radio system for propulsion cutoff at a preselected speed, after which the rocket followed a ballistic trajectory. The A5s reached a height of 12 km (7.5 mi) and a range of 18 kilometres (11 miles). Up to 80 launches by October 1943 developed an understanding of the rocket's aerodynamics, and tests of a better guidance system. The aerodynamic data resulted in a fin and rudder design that was basically the same one used for the A4.

At the conclusion of the A5 testing, Dornberger stated, "I now knew that we should succeed in creating a weapon with far greater range than any artillery. What we had successfully done with the A5 must be equally valid, in improved form, for the A4."

== A4/V-2 rocket (1942–1945) ==
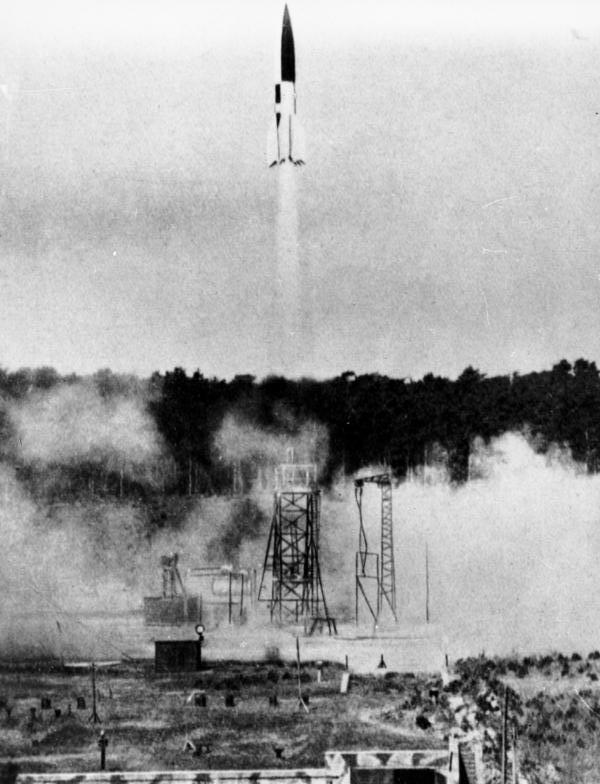
A V-2 missile being launched in June 1943

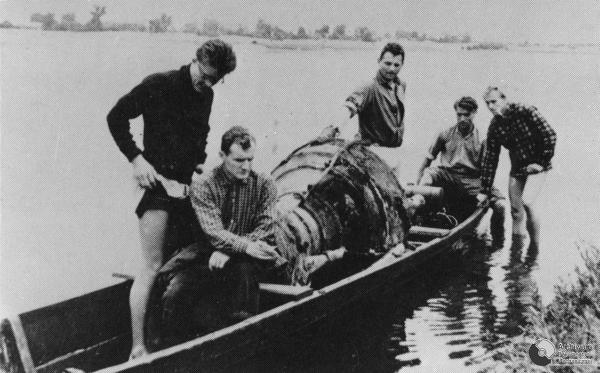
V-2 rocket being recovered from the Bug River near Sarnaki

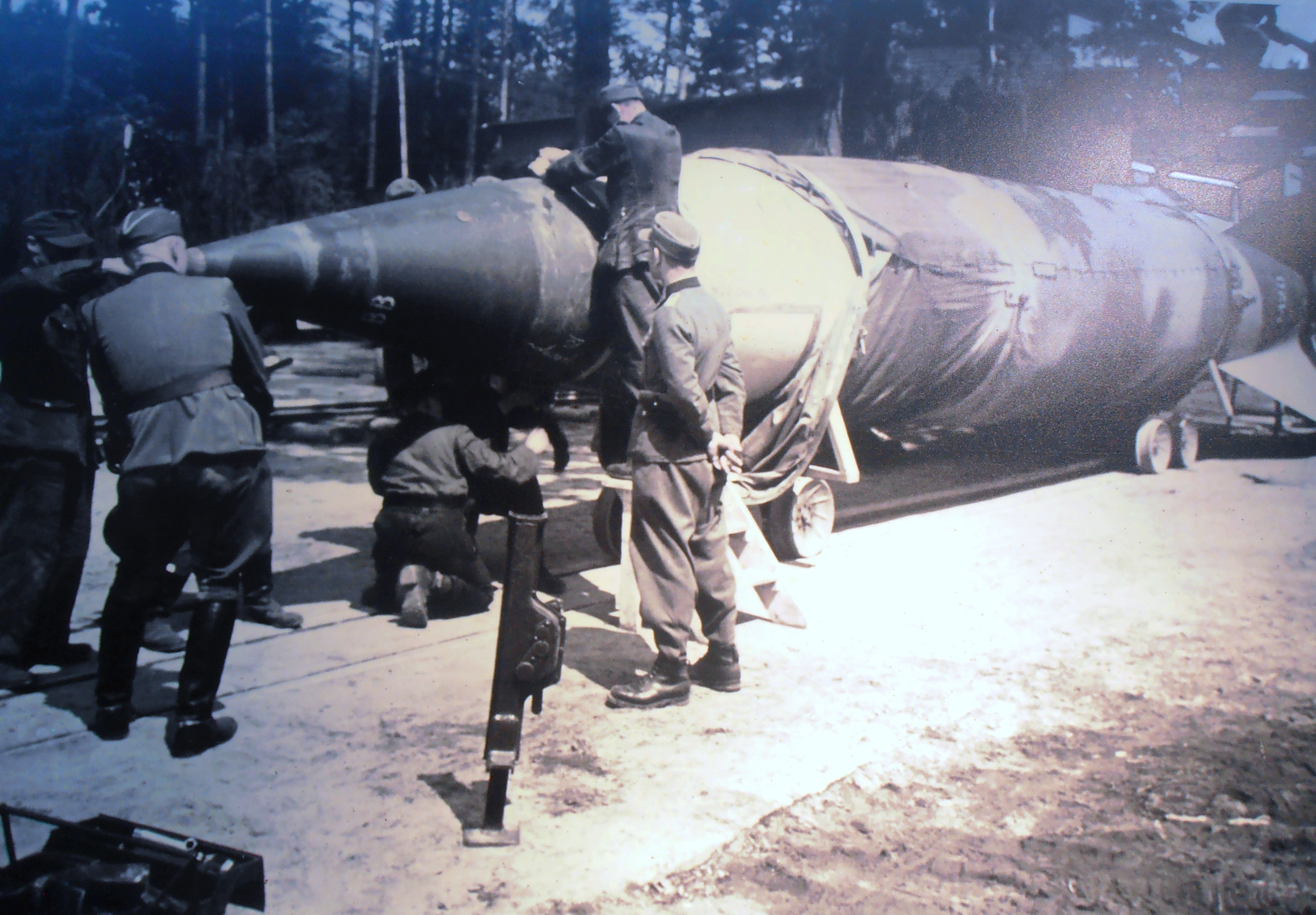
V-2 rocket in Blizna

In the late 1920s, Karl Becker realised that a loophole in the Treaty of Versailles allowed Germany to develop rocket weapons. General Becker was very influential during the development of the A4 until he committed suicide on 8 April 1940 following criticism from Adolf Hitler.

The A4 was a full-sized design with a range of about 320 kilometres (200 mi), an initial peak altitude of 89 kilometers (55 mi) and a payload of about 1,000 kg (2,200 lb). Versions of the A4 were used in warfare. They included the first ballistic missile and the first projectile to reach outer space.

The propellants of choice continued to be liquid oxygen, with a 75% ethanol and 25% water mixture. The water reduced the flame temperature, acted as a coolant, and reduced thermal stress.

This increase in capability came from a redesign of the A3 engine, now known as the A5, by Walter Thiel. It became clearer that von Braun's designs were turning into useful weapons, and Dornberger moved the team from the artillery testing grounds at Kummersdorf (near Berlin) to Peenemünde, on the island of Usedom on Germany's Baltic coast, to provide more room for testing and greater secrecy. This version was reliable, and by 1941 the team had fired about 70 A5 rockets. The first A4 flew in March 1942, flying about 1.6 kilometers (1 mi) and crashing into the water. The second launch reached an altitude of 11 kilometers (7 mi) before exploding. The third rocket, launched on 3 October 1942, followed its trajectory perfectly. It landed 193 kilometers (120 mi) away, and reached a height of 83 kilometers (52 mi). The highest altitude reached during the war was 174.6 kilometres (108.5 miles) on 20 June 1944.

Production started in 1943 on the rocket. The missile testing ground at Blizna was quickly located by the Polish resistance movement, the Home Army (Armia Krajowa), thanks to reports from local farmers. Armia Krajowa field agents managed to obtain pieces of the fired rockets by arriving on the scene before German patrols. In early March 1944, British Intelligence Headquarters received a report of an Armia Krajowa agent (code name: "Makary") who had covertly surveyed the Blizna railway line and observed a freight car heavily guarded by SS troops containing "an object which, though covered by a tarpaulin, bore every resemblance to a monstrous torpedo". Subsequently, a plan was formed to make an attempt to capture a complete unexploded V-2 rocket and transport it to Britain. Around 20 May 1944, a relatively undamaged V-2 rocket fell on the swampy bank of the Bug River near the village of Sarnaki, and local Poles concealed it before German arrival. The rocket was then dismantled and smuggled across Poland. In late July 1944, the Polish resistance secretly transported parts of the rocket out of Poland in Operation Most III (Bridge III) for analysis by British intelligence.

=== Projekt Schwimmweste ===
In late 1943 German Labour Front (Deutsche Arbeitsfront/DAF) Director, Otto Lafferenz, proposed the idea of a towable watertight container which could hold an A4 rocket. This suggestion progressed to the design of a container of 500 tons displacement to be towed behind a U-boat. Once in firing position, the containers would be trimmed to drop their aft end to a vertical position for launch. The project was dubbed Projekt Schwimmweste (German for "Project Life Jacket") and the containers themselves referred to by the codename Prüfstand XII (German for "Test Rig XII"). Work on the containers was carried out by the Vulkanwerft, and a single example was completed by the end of the war, but never tested with a rocket launch.

=== A4b/A9 ===
In anticipation of the possibility that launch sites might be forced back into the Reich itself, von Braun and his colleagues were pressured to develop a longer-range version of the A4 known alternatively as A9 and A4b, the reason for the dual designation being that the A4 series had received "national priority"; the A4b designation ensured the availability of scarce resources.

In June 1939, Kurt Patt of the Peenemünde Design Office, proposed wings for converting rocket speed and altitude into aerodynamic lift and range. As the rocket encountered thicker atmosphere on its descent phase, it would execute a pullout and enter a shallow glide, trading speed for distance. Patt also proposed the Flossengeschoss (fin projectile). Both concepts were used by Walter Dornberger when he drafted a memo for presentation to Hitler regarding the "America rocket" on 31 July 1940.

Design studies on the A9 began in 1940. In addition to its wings, the A9 would have been somewhat larger than the A4 and its engine would have produced about 30% more thrust. Following wind tunnel testing of models, the design was subsequently modified to replace the wings with fuselage strakes, as the tests showed that these provided better lift at supersonic speeds and also solved the problem of transonic shift of the center of lift.

Development was suspended in 1941, but in 1944 several V-2s were modified to an approximation of the A9 configuration under the designation A4b. It was calculated that by fitting wings, the A4's range would be extended to 800 km (500 mi), allowing targets in Britain to be attacked from launch sites within Germany. It was intended that following launch the curve of the A4b's trajectory would become shallower and the rocket would glide toward its target. It was anticipated that interception by enemy aircraft at the end of the glide phase would be almost impossible, as over the target the A4b was intended to enter a near vertical dive, leaving little time for interception.

The A4b concept was tested by fitting swept back wings to two A4s launched from Blizna. Little development work had been carried out, and the first launch on 27 December 1944 was a complete failure. The second launch attempt, on 24 January 1945, was partially successful, in that the wing broke off, but the A4b still managed to become the first winged guided missile to break the sound barrier and attain Mach 4.

== Variations – Planned, not built ==
=== A6 ===
A6 was a designation applied to a variant of the A5 test rocket which used different propellants.

Some sources indicate that it was also applied to a speculative proposal for a piloted aerial reconnaissance version of the A4b winged variant of the A4. This A6 was initially proposed to the German Air Ministry as an uninterceptable reconnaissance craft. It would be launched vertically by rocket, taking it to an apogee of 95 km (59 mi); after re-entering the atmosphere it would enter a supersonic glide phase, when its single ramjet would be ignited. It was hoped that this would provide 15 to 20 minutes of cruise at 2,900 km/h (1,800 mph) and would allow the aircraft to return to its base and make a conventional runway landing assisted by a drag chute. However, the Air Ministry had no requirement for such an aircraft and the proposal was rejected. Similar concepts (though uncrewed) were produced after the war in the form of the US SM-64 Navaho missile and the USSR's Burya, both intercontinental cruise missiles with ramjet propulsion.

=== A7 ===
The A7 was a winged design that was never fully constructed. It was worked on between 1940 and 1943 at Peenemünde for the Kriegsmarine. The A7 was similar in structure to the A5, but had larger tail unit fins (1.621 m^{2}) in order to obtain greater range in gliding flight. Two unpowered models of the A7 were dropped from aeroplanes in order to test flight stability; no powered test was ever performed. The finished rocket should have produced a takeoff thrust of 15 kN (3,400 lb) and a takeoff weight of 1,000 kg (2,200 lb). The design had a diameter of 0.38 m (1.2 ft) and a length of 5.91 m (19.4 ft).

=== A8 ===
The A8 was a proposed "stretched" variant of the A4, to use storable rocket propellants (most likely nitric acid and kerosene). The design never reached the prototype stage, but further design work was carried out after the war by a German rocket team in France as the "Super V-2". The project was eventually cancelled, but led to the French Véronique and Diamant rocket projects.

=== A9/A10 ===
Aggregat 9/10
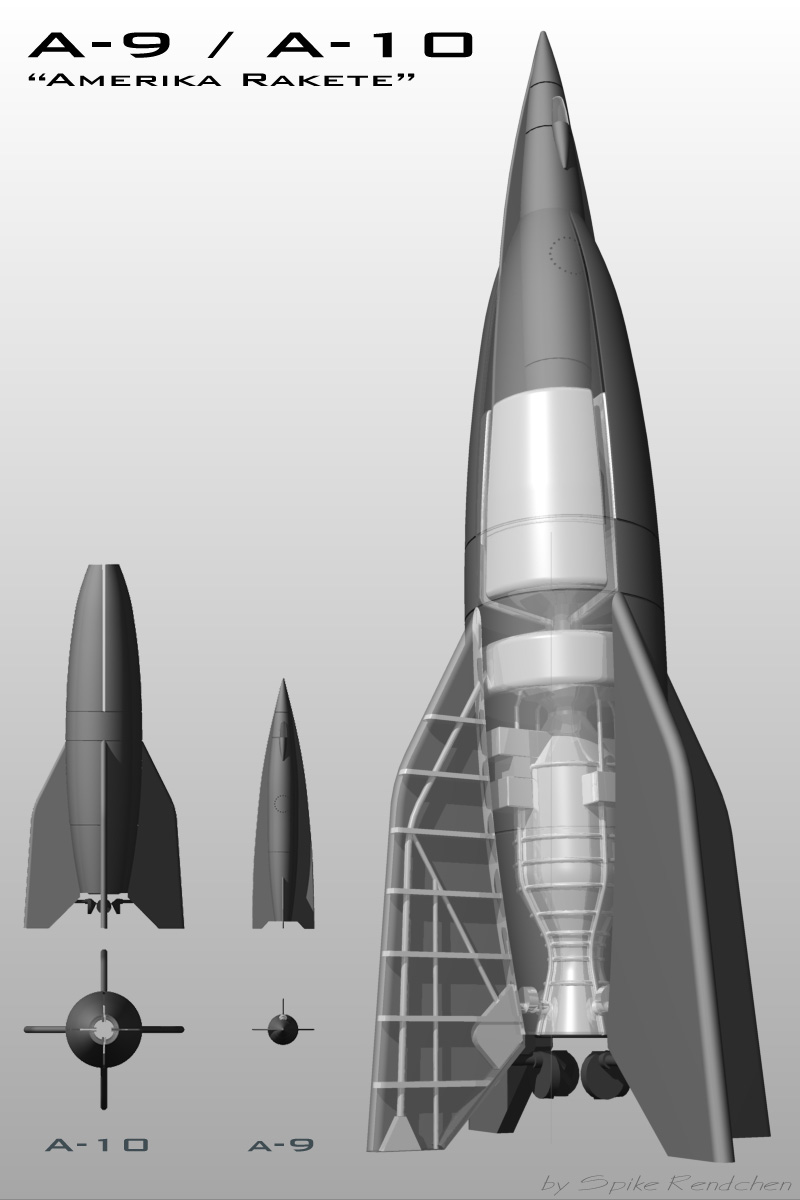
- Type: IRBM second stage

Service history
- In service: test only, not deployed

Production history
- Manufacturer: studied by Army Research Center Peenemünde
- Unit cost: none mass-manufactured

Specifications
- Mass: 16,259 kg (35,845 lb)
- Length: 14.18 m (46 ft 6 1/4 in)
- Diameter: 1.65 m (5 ft 5 in) maximum
- Wingspan: 3.2 m (10 ft 6 in)
- Warhead: 1,000 kg (2,200 lb) payload
- Engine: A9
- Operational range: 800 km (500 mi) (single stage flight) or 5,500 km (3,400 mi) (with booster)
- Flight altitude: 190 km (120 mi) (single stage flight) or 390 km (240 mi) (A9/A10 combination)
- Maximum speed: 3,400 m/s (7,600 mph) (A9/A10 two stage combination)
- Launch platform: ground launch pad or A10

It was proposed to use an advanced version of the A9 to attack targets on the US mainland from launch sites in Europe, for which it would need to be launched atop a booster stage, the A10.

Design work on the A10 began in 1940, for a projected first flight to take place in 1946. The initial design was carried out by Ludwig Roth und Graupe and was completed on 29 June 1940. Hermann Oberth worked on the design during 1941, and in December 1941 Walter Thiel proposed that the A10 use an engine composed of six bundled A4 engines, which it was thought would give a total thrust of 1,800 kN (400,000 lb).

Work on the A10 was resumed in late 1944 under the Projekt Amerika codename, and the A10's design was amended to incorporate a cluster of six A4 combustion chambers feeding into a single expansion nozzle. This was later altered to a large single chamber and single nozzle. Test stands were constructed at Peenemunde for firings of the 2,000 kN (440,000 lb) thrust motor.

It was considered that existing guidance systems would not be accurate enough over a distance of 5,000 km (3,100 mi), and it was decided to make the A9 piloted. The pilot was to be guided on his terminal glide towards the target by radio beacons on U-boats and by automatic weather stations landed in Greenland and Labrador.

The final design of the A10 booster was approximately 20 m (66 ft) in height. Powered by a 1,670 kN (380,000 lb) thrust rocket burning diesel oil and nitric acid, during its 50-second burn it would have propelled its A9 second stage to a speed of about 4,300 km/h (2,700 mph). The A9 would then ignite and accelerate an additional 5,760 km/h (3,580 mph), reaching a speed of 10,080 km/h (6,260 mph), a peak altitude of 56 kilometres (35 mi), and covering 4,000 kilometres (2,500 mi) in about 35 minutes. The spent A10 would descend by brake flaps and parachute to be recovered in the sea and reused.

=== A11 ===
The A11 (Japan Rakete) was a design concept which would have acted as the first stage of a three-stage rocket, the other two stages being the A9 and A10.

The A11 design was shown by von Braun to US officers in Garmisch-Partenkirchen; the drawing was published in 1946 by the US Army. The A11 was shown as using six of the large single-chamber engines proposed for the A10 stage, with a modified A10 second stage nested within the A11. The design also showed the winged A9, indicating a gliding landing or bombing mission. To achieve orbit, either a new "kick stage" would have been required, or the A9 would have to have been lightened. In either case, a payload of approximately 300 kg (660 lb) could have been placed in a low Earth orbit, roughly equivalent to the modern-day Electron rocket.

=== A12 ===
The A12 design if built would have been an orbital rocket. It was proposed as a four-stage vehicle, comprising A12, A11, A10 and A9 stages. Calculations suggested it could place as much as 10 tonnes (22,000 lb) of payload in low Earth orbit, comparable to the later Saturn I rocket of the Apollo program.

The A12 stage itself would have weighed around 3,500 tonnes (7,700,000 lb) fully fueled, and would have stood 33 m (108 ft) high. It was to have been propelled by 50 A10 engines, fueled by liquid oxygen and ethanol.
