= Alfred Brueckner =

German classical archaeologist

Alfred Brueckner (7 September 1861, in Magdeburg – 15 January 1936, in Berlin) was a German classical archaeologist. He was a specialist in Greek funerary art.

In 1886, he obtained his PhD at the University of Strasbourg, where he was a student of Adolf Michaelis. From 1888 to 1890, via a travel scholarship from the Deutschen Archäologischen Institut (DAI), he visited Greece and Asia Minor. Until 1924 (year of retirement) he taught classes at Prinz-Heinrichs-Gymnasium in Schöneberg. He was a member of the Deutschen Archäologischen Institut (since 1892) and the Archäologischen Gesellschaft zu Berlin.

In 1893, under Wilhelm Dörpfeld, he participated in excavatory work at Troy, and for a number of years, conducted excavations at Kerameikos in Athens. He made significant contributions as an editor of Alexander Conze's Die attischen grabreliefs, a project involving Attican funerary reliefs (1893-1922).

== Selected works ==
- Ornament und Form der attischen Grabstelen Strasbourg 1886 (dissertation) – Ornamentalism and form pertaining to Attican grave stelae.
- Von den griechischen Grabreliefs, gearbeitet auf Grund des akademischen Apparates der Sammlung der Grabreliefs. 1888 – Greek grave reliefs, etc.
- Ein attischer Friedhof (with Erich Pernice), 1883 – An Attican cemetery.
- Anakalypteria, 1904.
- Der Friedhof am Eridanos bei der Hagia Triada zu Athen, 1909 – The cemetery of Eridanus by the Hagia Triada of Athens.
- Kerameikos-Studien, Kerameikos studies, 1910.
