= Hans Hüter =

German-Swiss rocket engineer (1906–1970)

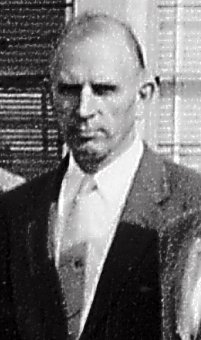
Hans Hermann Hüter

Hans Hermann Hüter (March 21, 1906 – June 9, 1970 in Huntsville, Alabama) was a German-Swiss rocket engineer.

Being part of the engineering team around Hermann Oberth, Rudolf Nebel and Klaus Riedel (together with Wernher von Braun, Rolf Engel, Hans Bermüller, Paul Ehmayr, Kurt Heinisch and Helmuth Zoike) Hüter was involved in the development, construction and tests of the first rockets powered by liquid gas - initially at the Berlin-Reinickendorf rocket airfield, most recently at the Peenemünde Army Research Center. He was supposed to fly as a passenger in the "Magdeburg pilot rocket" in 1933, but this flight ultimately failed.

After World War II, he was brought to the United States as part of Operation Paperclip, where he worked in the group of Wernher von Braun at Fort Bliss. In 1960, he became head of the Agena and Centaur Systems Office at NASA.
