= Magdeburger Startgerät =

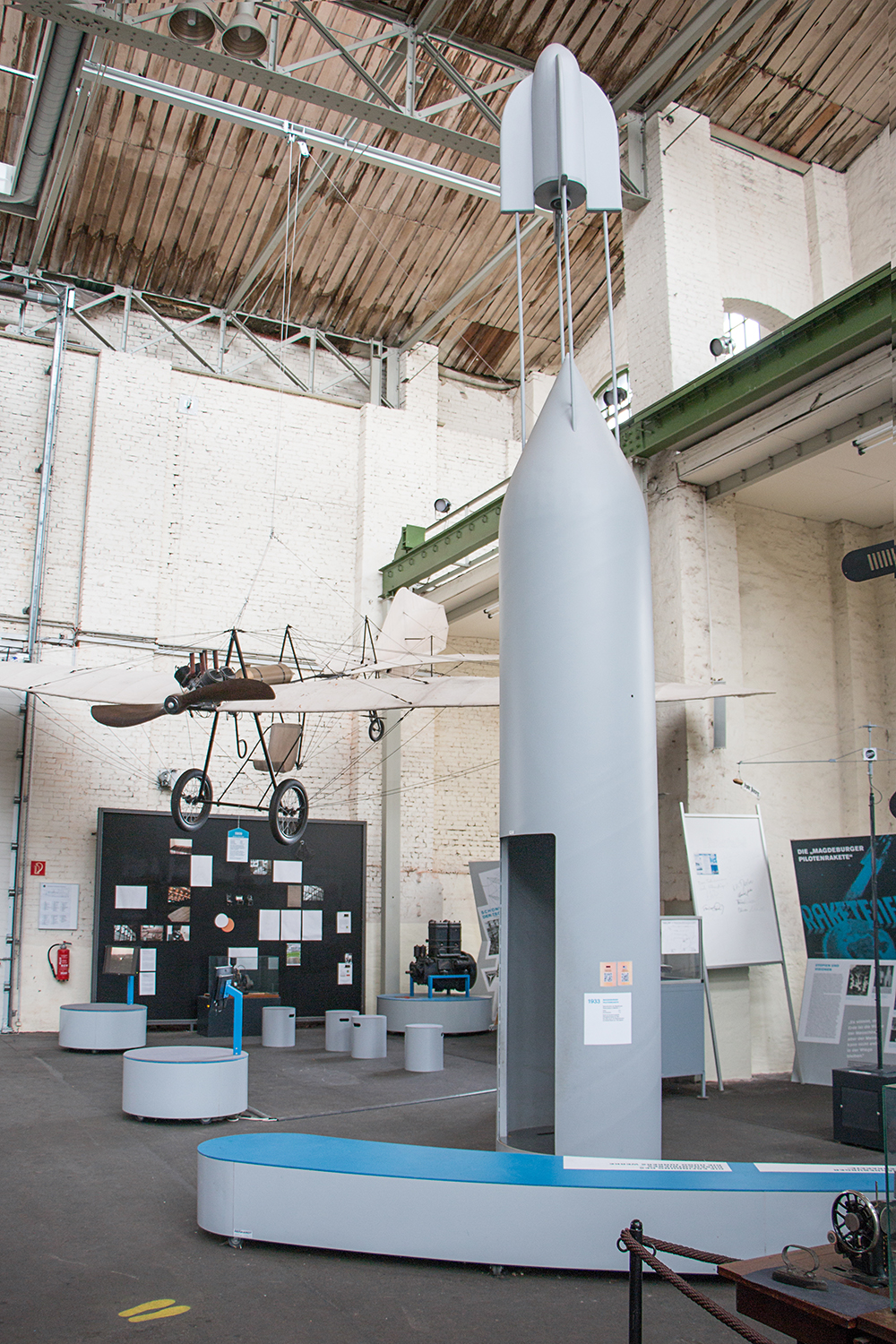
Model of the rocket on display in the Magdeburg museum of technology

The Magdeburger Startgerät (also known as the Magdeburg pilot rocket and 10-L for the 10 liters of liquid fuel it contains) is a missile that was intended to ensure the first manned rocket flight in history. Despite successful tests, the pilot flight originally planned for March 1933 never took place. After several delays, the project was finally stopped in 1934 when the National Socialists prohibited all private missile attempts (which also included the Magdeburg experiment).

== The idea ==
The project was initiated in 1932 by Franz Mengering, a businessman from Magdeburg, a follower of the Hollow Earth concept. Mengering commissioned Rudolf Nebel to develop a manned rocket in order to reach the Moon 5000 kilometers away. Nebel, on the other hand, thought it was only realistic to develop a rocket that could carry a person for a distance of 1 kilometer and at a maximum altitude of 20 kilometers.

== Development and testing ==
The development of the rocket began in August 1932 and was carried out by the team around Rudolf Nebel, consisting of Klaus Riedel, Hans Hüter, Kurt Heinisch, Hans Bermüller, Paul Ehmayr and Helmut Zoike. Hans Hüter was planned to act as a pilot. Tests on the ground took place until March 1933, and launch tests began in June 1933 - first in Mose, later on Tegeler See and Schwielowsee. The last documented test flight took place in September 1933

== Cancellation ==
The activities of the Verein für Raumschiffahrt and at Raketenflugplatz Berlin-Reinickendorf were under strict surveillance from spring 1933, when the National Socialists came to power. At the end of 1933 the Gestapo confiscated all documents, and in June 1934 the organization and the rocket airfield were closed. Private rocket attempts were prohibited, and all activities were continued under the patronage of the German Wehrmacht in the Kummersdorf Army Research Center, and later in the Peenemünde Army Research Center.
