= Riedel =

Riedel is a German surname. Notable people with the surname include:

- Adolph Friedrich Johann Riedel (1809–1872), German industrialist and politician
- August Riedel (Johann Friedrich Ludwig Heinrich August Riedel) (1799–1883), German painter
- Bruce Riedel (born 1953), U.S. foreign policy analyst and author
- Eberhard Riedel (1938–2026), German alpine skier
- Georg Riedel (Altstadt Kantor) (1676–1738), German composer
- Georg Riedel (jazz musician) (1934–2024), Czech-born Swedish musician
- Hermann Riedel (1847–1913), German composer
- Jan Riedel (born 1982), German politician
- Jesse Riedel (born 1999), American YouTuber
- Johan Gerard Friedrich Riedel (1832–1911), Dutch East Indies politician and anthropologist
- Johann Friedrich Riedel (1798–1860), German missionary
- Klaus Riedel (1907–1944), German engineer
- Lars Riedel (born 1967), German discus thrower
- Ludwig Riedel (1790–1861), German botanist
- Oliver Riedel (born 1971), German musician
- Ryszard Riedel (1956–1994), Polish blues singer and author of many songs of group Dzem
- Walter Riedel (1902–1968), German engineer
- Antje Göhler (born Riedel, 1967), German chess master and writer

== See also ==
- Riedel's thyroiditis, a disease
- Riedel (glass manufacturer)
- Riedel Communications, A company for real-time networks for video, audio, data and communications.
- Riedel (crater), a Moon crater
