= Paul Ehmayr =

German-Austrian rocket engineer

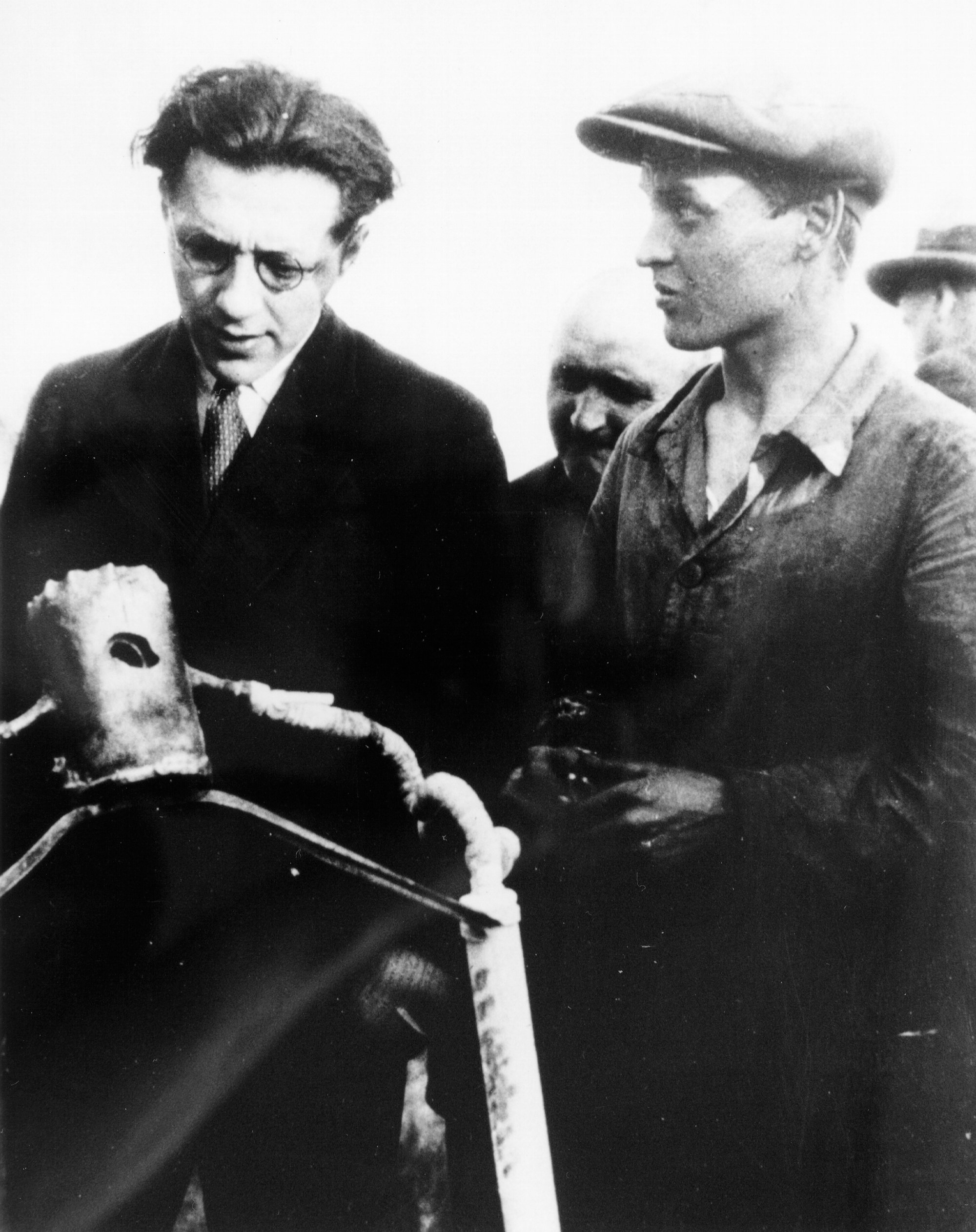
Paul Ehmayr with Willy Ley (holding the Repulsor I rocket after its second flight)

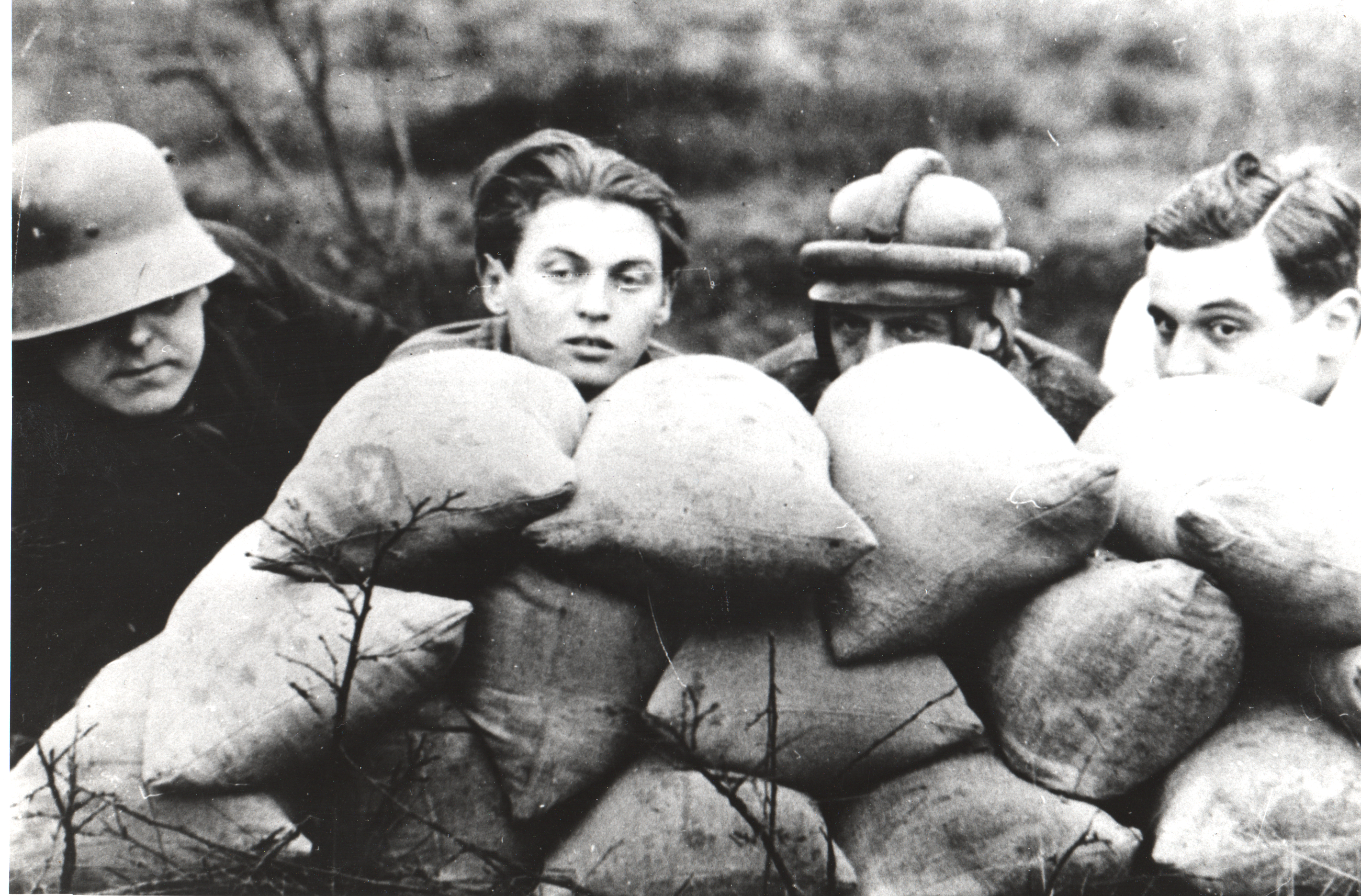
(Unknown) Wörl, Paul Ehmayr, Rudolf Nebel and Klaus Riedel

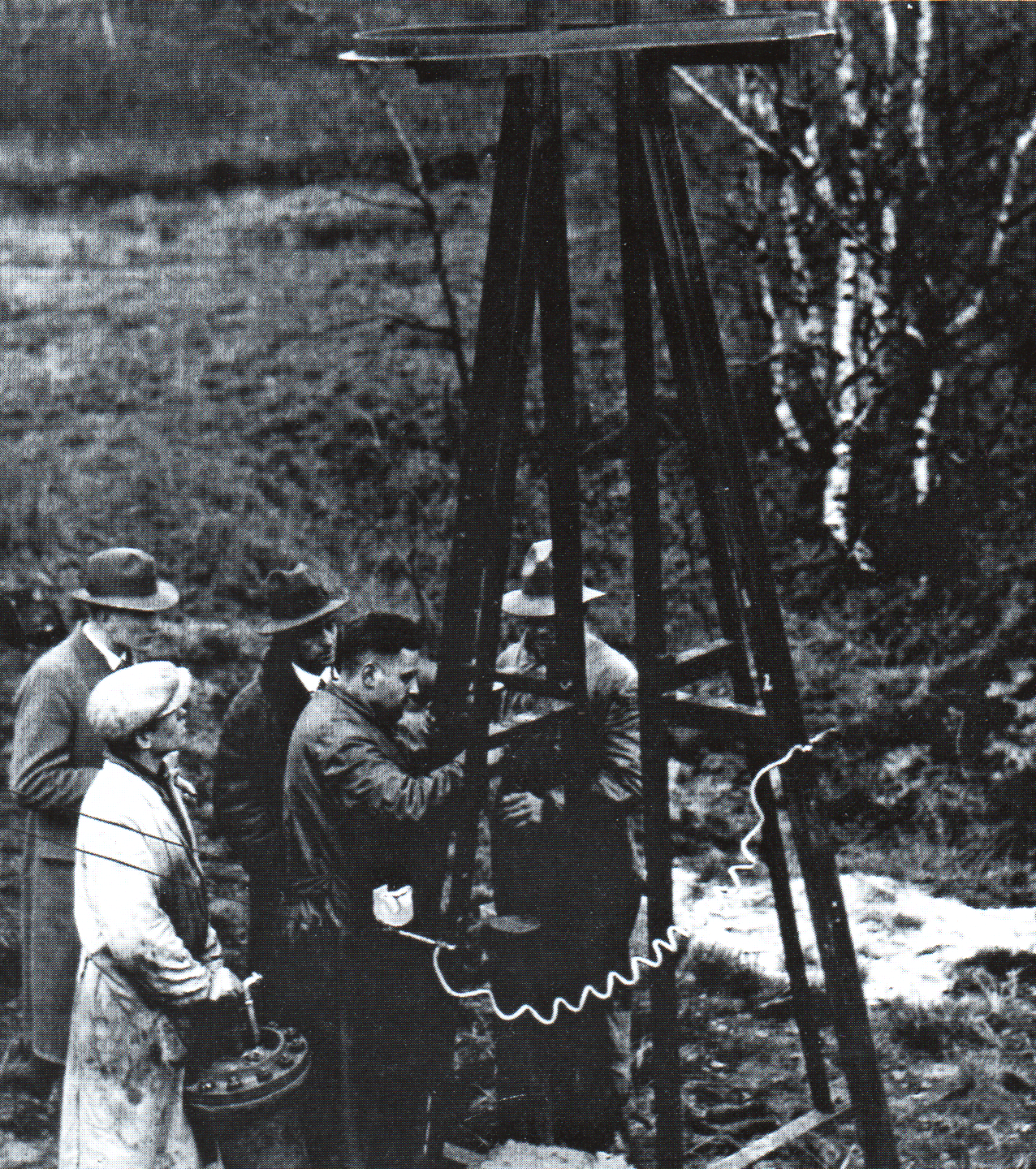
Rolf Engel, Paul Ehmayr, Rudolf Nebel, Klaus Riedel and Kurt Heinisch with the rocket components (cone nozzle) taken from the UfA movie Woman in the Moon

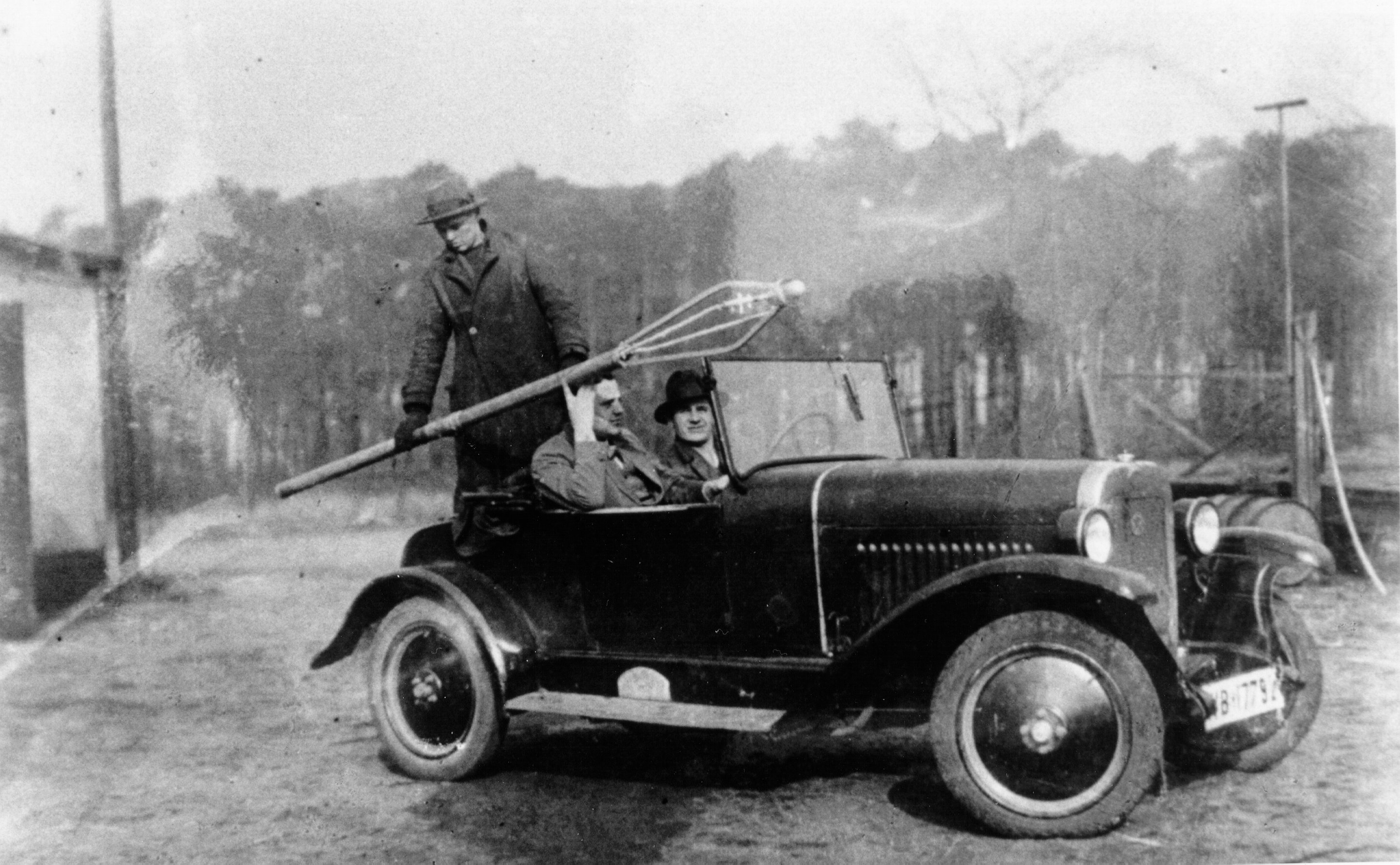
Paul Ehmayr (holding the rocket), Klaus Riedel and Wernher von Braun (driver) in an Opel 4 PS (Laubfrosch)

Paul Ehmayr (October 28, 1909, in Vienna – September 15, 1993 in Linz; sometimes incorrectly spelled as Ehmayer, Ehmeier or Ehmeyer) was a German-Austrian rocket engineer. He was a precision mechanic. His masterpiece was a barometer.

Due to the high level of unemployment in Austria, Ehmayr went to Mecklenburg in 1927, then to Berlin. There he worked from 1930 as part of the engineering team around Hermann Oberth, Rudolf Nebel and Klaus Riedel (together with Wernher von Braun, Rolf Engel, Hans Bermüller, Hans Hüter, Kurt Heinisch and Helmuth Zoike) in the development, especially in the construction and experiments with the first rockets powered by liquid gas.

Development and tests initially took place in the Chemisch-Technische Reichsanstalt, financially supported by the Army Weapons Office. When Hermann Oberth returned to Romania, the team continued its activities in the newly founded Berlin-Reinickendorf rocket airfield where they reused the rocket stand featured in the movie "Woman in the Moon". The jointly developed rockets included the Oberth cone nozzle ("Kegeldüse"), different versions of the Repulsor, the Mirak I-III and the Magdeburg pilot rocket (10-L)

The activities of the Verein für Raumschifffahrt and at Raketenflugplatz Berlin have been under strict surveillance. since the National Socialists came to power in the spring of 1933. After the Gestapo confiscated all documents in the same year, the organization and the rocket airfield were finally closed in June 1934

Since then, private rocket attempts have been prohibited. - all activities have now been continued under the patronage of the German Wehrmacht in the Kummersdorf Army Research Center, later in the Peenemünde Army Research Center

From then on Ehmayr worked in various companies as a technical employee until he returned to Austria together with his wife and son at the end of the war. There he lived first in Wels, then until his death in 1993 in Linz.

Paul Ehmayr was rewarded the Decoration of Honour for Services to the Republic of Austria.
