= VfR =

VfR is a German-language acronym that may appear in various contexts:

- Verein für Raumschiffahrt, en:Society for Space Travel, a historical amateur rocket club in Germany
- Verein für Rasensport (en:Association for Field Sports) or Verein für Rasenspiele (en:Association for Field Games), a commonly used term for German Sport clubs, as in VfR Mannheim
