= Johannes Winkler =

German aerospace engineer

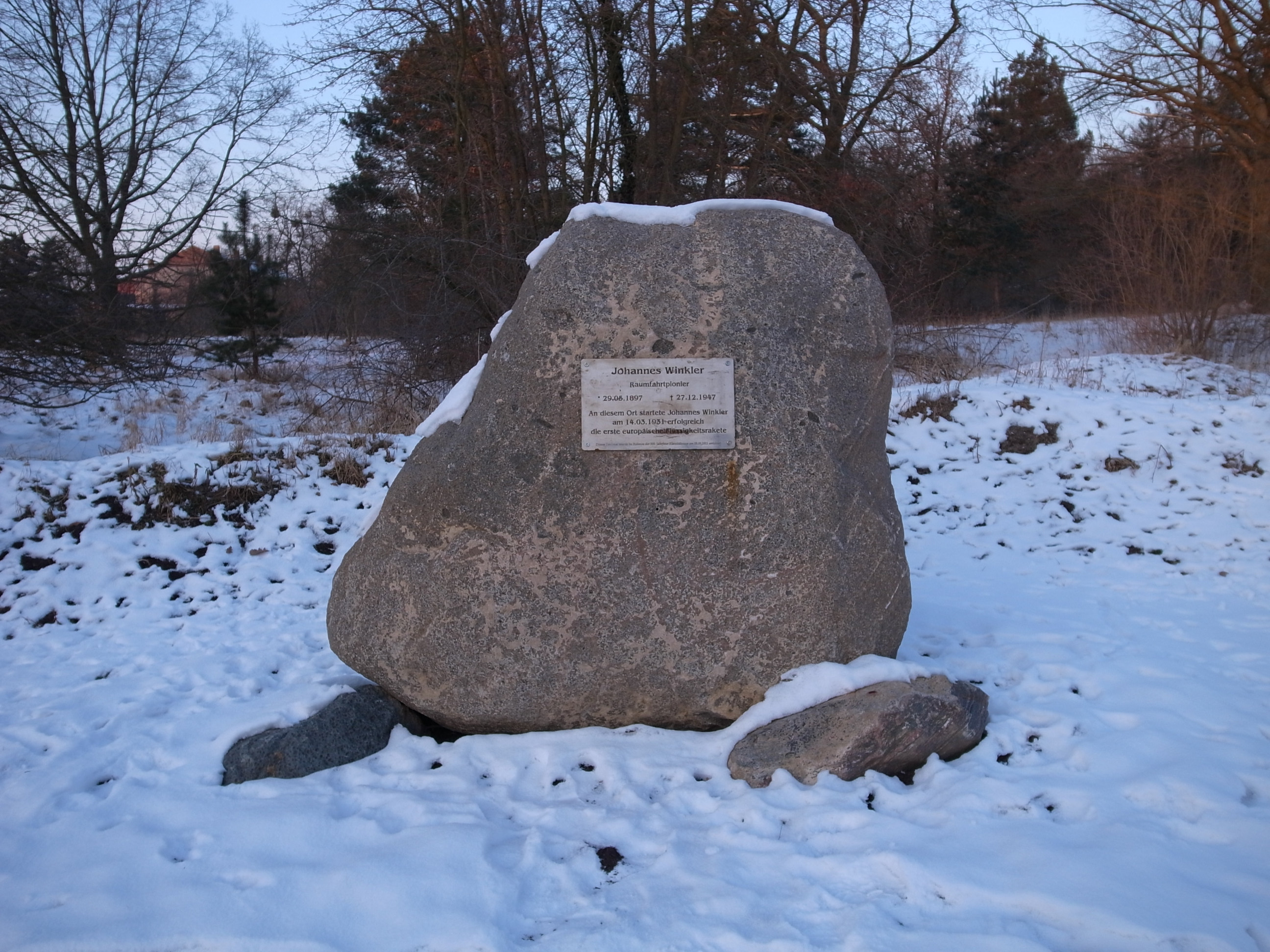
- in Dessau
- Born: 29 May 1897; Bad Carlsruhe, German Empire present-day Pokój, Poland
- Died: 27 December 1947 (aged 50) -- stroke Braunschweig-Querum
- Scientific career
- Fields: Aerospace engineering
- Workplaces: -1939: VfR; 1939-1945: Aeronautical Research Institute; 1945-1947: Junkers

Notes
- 1st President VfR (1927)

Johannes Winkler (29 May 1897 – 27 December 1947) was a German rocket pioneer who co-founded with Max Valier of Opel RAK the first German rocket society "Verein für Raumschiffahrt" and launched, after Friedrich Wilhelm Sander's successful Opel RAK liquid-rocket launches in 1929, one of the first successful liquid-fuelled rocket in Europe.

In 1915 during World War I, he joined the German army and was wounded in action the following year, leading to a lengthy hospitalisation. After his recovery, he studied as a machinist at the Danzig technical college and found a job at Junkers.

On 5 July 1927, he was one of the founders the Verein für Raumschiffahrt (VfR – "Spaceflight Society"). He also was the society's first president and editor of the VfR's Die Rakete' journal.

On 14 March 1931 at 4:45 pm, he launched the Hückel-Winkler I (HW-I) at the Gross Kühnau drill field near Dessau. According to his account, it was planned to reach an altitude of 500 meters, but it turned and flew horizontally, landing 200 meters from the pad. The maximum altitude of the rocket was not recorded. It was powered by liquid oxygen and liquid methane.

Eighteen months after the HW-I flight, Winkler launched the HW-II on 6 October 1932 in a public demonstration, which included invited officials from the Königsberg council. Unfortunately, the rocket exploded within seconds of ignition because of a faulty fuel valve.

Winkler designed a number of other rockets and JATO units for Junkers and then a government aviation research institute, but none left the drawing board.

== Honours ==
The Winkler crater, a small impact crater on the far side of the Moon, is named after Johannes Winkler.
