= Max Valier =

Austrian rocketry pioneer (1895–1930)

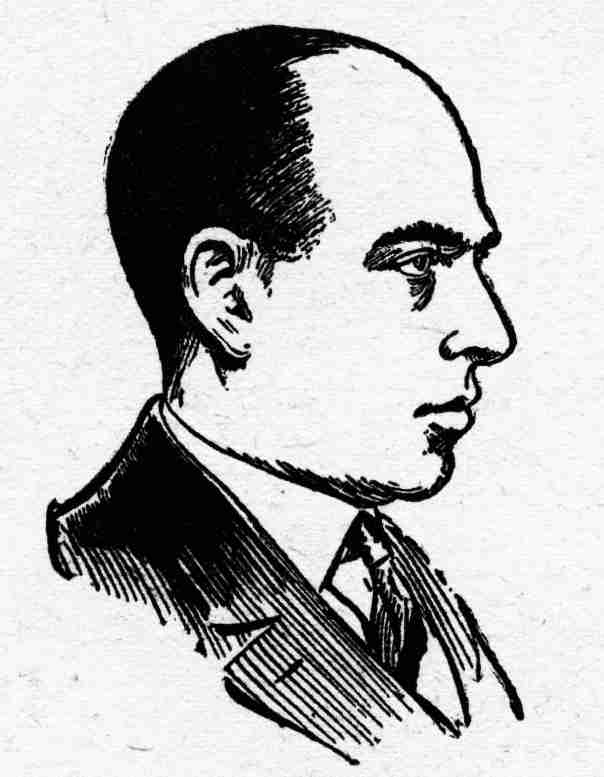
- Valier as depicted in Air Wonder Stories, February 1930.
- Born: 9 February 1895; Bolzano, County of Tyrol, Austria-Hungary
- Died: 17 May 1930 (aged 35); Berlin, Weimar Republic
- Education: University of Innsbruck
- Scientific career
- Fields: Physics

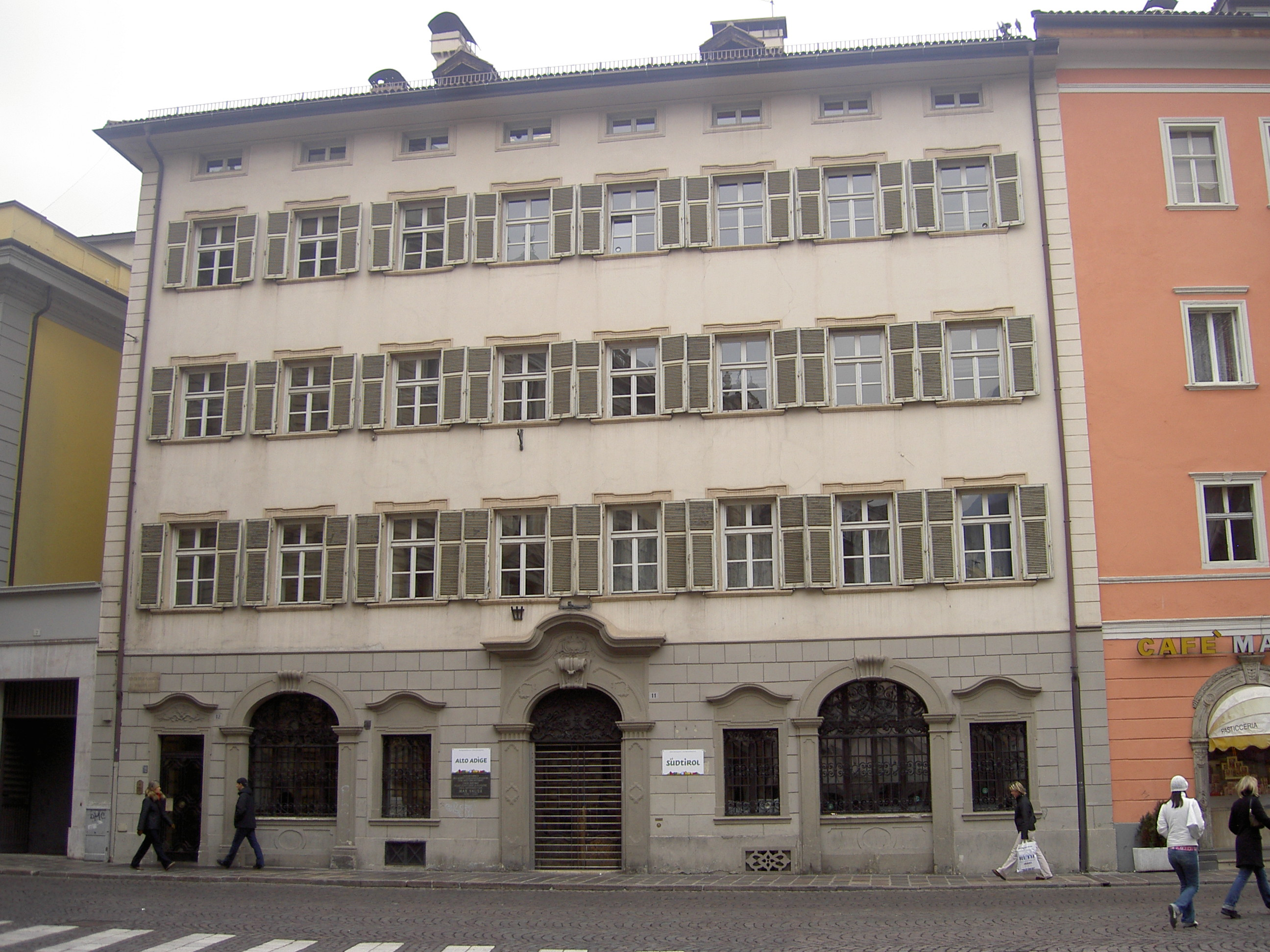
Valier's birthplace.

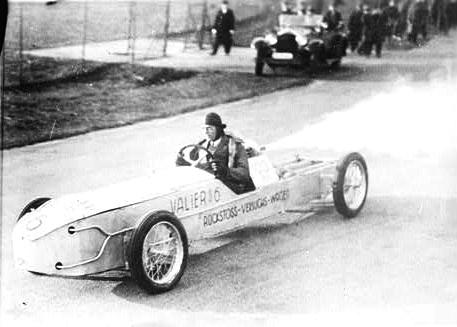
Valier in a rocket car, c. 1930.

Max Valier (9 February 1895 – 17 May 1930) was an Austrian rocketry pioneer. He was a leading figure in the world's first large-scale rocket program, Opel-RAK, and helped found the German Verein für Raumschiffahrt (VfR – "Spaceflight Society") that would bring together many of the minds that would later make spaceflight a reality in the 20th century.

== Biography ==
Valier was born in Bozen in the County of Tyrol (now South Tyrol) and in 1913 enrolled to study physics at the University of Innsbruck. He also trained as a machinist at a nearby factory. His studies were interrupted by the First World War, during which he served in the Austro-Hungarian army's air corps as an aerial observer.

After the war, Valier did not return to his studies, but became a freelance science writer. In 1923, he read Hermann Oberth's landmark book Die Rakete zu den Planetenräumen (The Rocket into Interplanetary Space) and was inspired to write a similar work to explain Oberth's ideas in terms that could be understood by lay persons. With Oberth's assistance, he published Der Vorstoß in den Weltenraum (The Advance into Space) the following year. It was an outstanding success, going through six editions before 1930. He followed this with numerous articles on the subject of space travel, with titles like "Berlin to New York in One Hour" and "A Daring Trip to Mars".

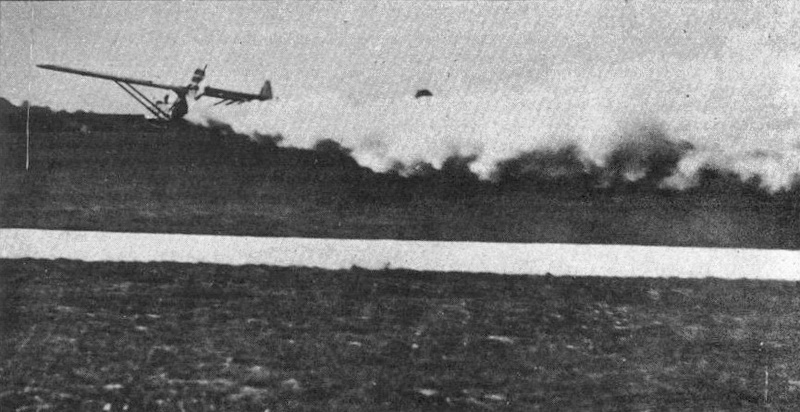
Opel RAK.1 - World's first public flight of a manned rocket-powered plane on September 30, 1929

In 1928 and 1929, he worked with Fritz von Opel on a number of rocket-powered cars and aircraft within the world's first large-scale rocket program Opel-RAK. For von Opel, these experimentations had also a very positive public relations effect for the Opel company, and for Valier, they were a way of further raising interest in rocketry amongst the general population. Friedrich Sander in these endeavours was chosen as the supplier of solid-fuel rocket motors. Valier's and von Opel's activities led to land and rail vehicle speed records, and eventually to the world's first rocket plane.

In 1929 Valier withdrew from his partnership with von Opel, disillusioned that von Opel was using rocketry merely as publicity for himself and his company, leaving Valier unable to pursue his own objectives. He also had decided that solid-propellant rockets' lower energy content than liquid propellants set a limit for the development of solid rocket technology, and that it was the right time to turn to the development of the latter.

Because this required expertise in handling liquid oxygen, Valier approached Paul Heylandt, whose factory in Berlin-Britz specialized in equipment for the production and storage of liquid oxygen, among other cryogenic gasses. At the end of 1929 Heylandt assigned his test and development engineers Walter Riedel and Arthur Rudolph to the work.

Valier's first engines were based on the combustion head of a blowtorch, burning ethyl alcohol diluted with water and gaseous oxygen. His first test-firing was on 4 March 1930, and over the following weeks Valier, Riedel, and Rudolph tested various combustion chamber and nozzle designs. On 22 March, Valier's alcohol/oxygen engine was mounted in his rocket car and ran for ~22 minutes in total across several static-fire tests. Liquid Oxygen was first used on 26 March, and used as the oxidizer on all subsequent rockets.

On 17 and 19 April 1930 Valier performed the first test drive of a liquid-propelled rocket car, with the Valier-Heylandt Rak. 7.

Valier also gained the attention of Henri Deterding of Royal Dutch Shell, who saw publicity value in a planned rocket-powered aircraft that would fly across the English Channel. Deterding's funding for Valier's rocketry efforts came on the condition that Valier change the fuel he used from ethanol to Shell kerosene. Unlike alcohol, kerosene is immiscible with water. To keep combustion temperature down, Valier emulsified the kerosene with water in a separate emulsion chamber before injection.

On 17 May 1930, Valier was testing the kerosene engine at the Heylandt works with Riedel and Rudolph. At about 9pm, the combustion chamber exploded as it reached 7 atm. A fragment pierced Valier's pulmonary artery, and he bled to death before an ambulance arrived. Riedel and Rudolph escaped unhurt. Riedel attributed the explosion to unburnt kerosene-water emulsion mixing with liquid oxygen. In Riedel's account, this formed a jelly-like explosive mass on the chamber wall that detonated when part of it fell into the combustion zone. His protégés Arthur Rudolph and Walter Riedel continued Valier's work at Heylandt, building new alcohol-oxygen powered rocket cars.

== Memorials ==
Max Valier is still remembered in South Tyrol as one of the most famous inventors and scientists of this province, and a number of institutions bear his name:

- The South-Tyrolean amateur astronomy society Amateurastronomen Max Valier and their public astronomical observatory "Max Valier" in Gummer (BZ Italy)
- The Technological Institute "Max Valier" in Bolzano, Italy
- The Max Valier X-ray telescopic satellite launched in 2017 orbits the Earth transmitting Morse Code on 145.96 MHz and 437.325 MHz.
