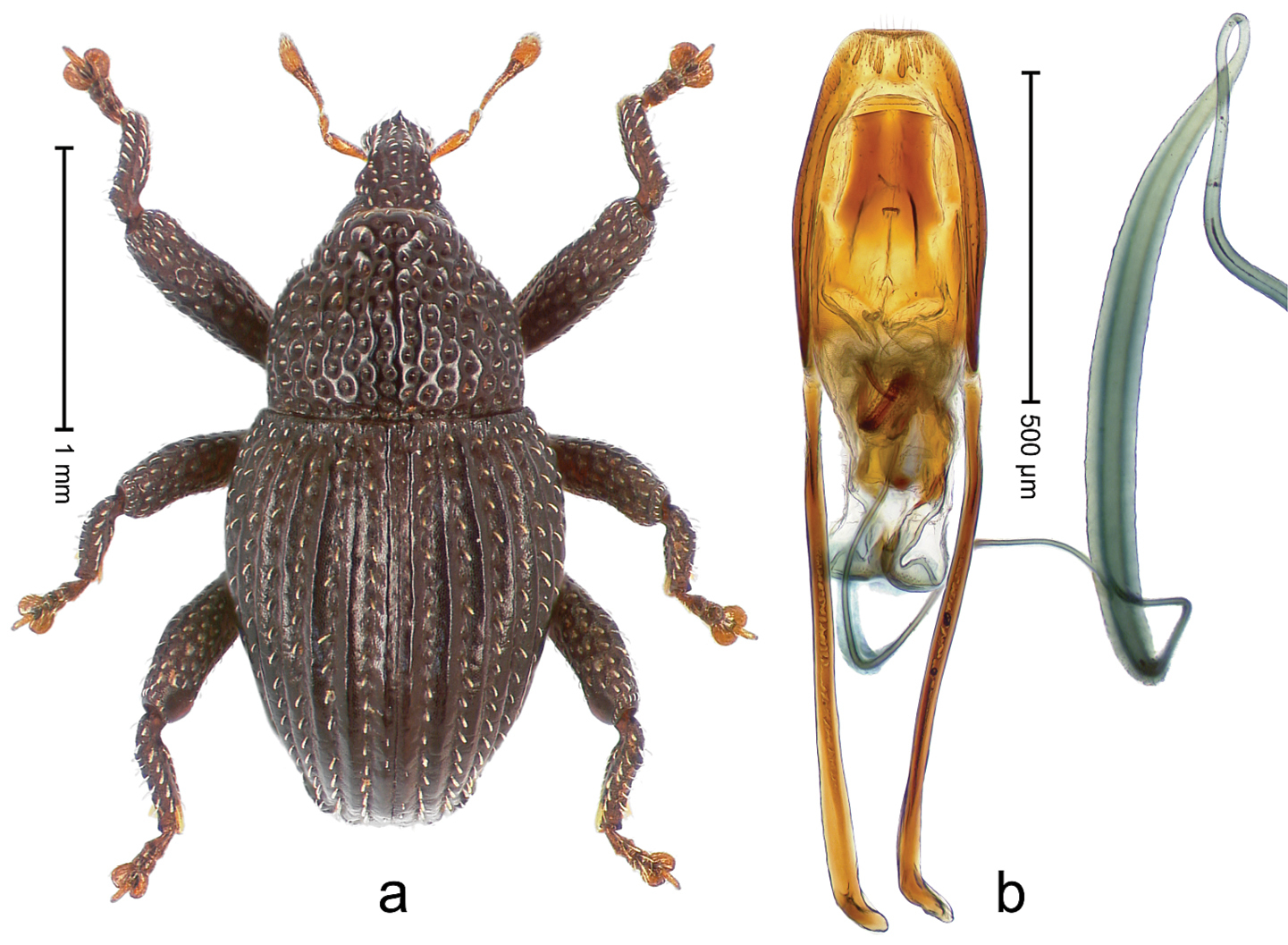
- Holotype specimen and penis

Scientific classification
- Kingdom: Animalia
- Phylum: Arthropoda
- Class: Insecta
- Order: Coleoptera
- Suborder: Polyphaga
- Infraorder: Cucujiformia
- Family: Curculionidae
- Genus: Trigonopterus
- Species: T. palawanensis

Binomial name
- Trigonopterus palawanensis Riedel, 2014

= Trigonopterus palawanensis =

Species of beetle

Trigonopterus palawanensis is a species of flightless weevil in the genus Trigonopterus from the Philippines.

== Etymology ==
The specific name is derived from that of the type locality.

== Description ==
Individuals measure 2.13–2.21 mm in length. Body is slightly oval in shape. General coloration is a dark rust-color or black, with rust-colored tarsi and antennae.

== Range ==
The species is found around elevations of 500–700 metres (1,600–2,300 ft) on Mount Bloomfield, in the Philippine province of Palawan.

== Phylogeny ==
T. palawanensis is part of the T. wallacei species group.
