= Augustin Maior =

Romanian physicist, educator, and inventor (1882–1963)

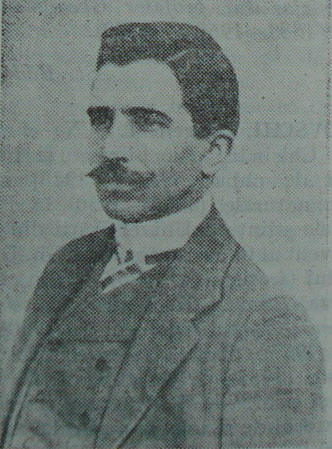
- Born: 22 August 1882; Szászrégen, Austria-Hungary (today Reghin, Romania)
- Died: 3 October 1963 (aged 81); Cluj, Romania
- Citizenship: Hungarian, Romanian
- Education: Faculty of Mechanical Engineering of the Budapest University of Technology and Economics
- Scientific career
- Fields: Physics
- Doctoral students: Hermann Oberth

Augustin Maior (22 August 1882 – 3 October 1963) was a Romanian physicist, educator and inventor.

== Studies ==
Maior was born in Reghin, Transylvania (then Szászrégen, Kingdom of Hungary, part of Austria-Hungary) on 21 August 1882. His parents, Teresa (a well-educated woman) and George (teacher and then director of the Romanian Primary School in Reghin) had five children: Olivia, Augustin, Julius, George and Ana.

Maior's early years of schooling in Reghin were in German: his kindergarten, primary and secondary schooling were at the German Evangelical School. Then he attended the Piarist High School in Marosvásárhely (today Târgu Mureș, Romania) and Catholic High School in Budapest. In addition to a facility for learning foreign languages, he showed promise in physics and mathematics. He passed the Baccalaureate exam in 1900 and then until 1904 he attended the Faculty of Mechanical Engineering of the Polytechnic Institute in Budapest. In 1905 he attended several postgraduate courses at renowned universities in Vienna, Munich and Göttingen, where he met many of the leading scientific personalities of the time, such as David Hilbert, Hermann Minkowski, Felix Klein, Carl David Tolmé Runge, Eduard Riecke, Ludwig Prandtl, Emil Wiechert and the younger physicists such as Max Born, Max von Laue and Peter Debye.

== Multiple telephony ==
In November 1905, Maior was employed as an engineer in the Electricity Laboratory of the General Directorate of Posts in Budapest. In 1906 he managed to transmit five calls simultaneously on a single 15-km telephone line, without interference between them. His "Theoretical Foundations of Multiple Telephony" was published in 1907 in the "Elektrotechnische Zeitschrift" and then, in 1914, "The Use of High-Frequency Alternating Currents in Telegraphy, Telephony and for Power Transmission" was published in "The Electrician."

== Return to Romania ==
After World War I and the union of Transylvania with Romania, Maior offered his expertise to the Romanian authorities, becoming director general of Posts, Telegraphs and Telephones of Transylvania and Banat. Almost simultaneously, in July 1919, he was appointed professor at the University of Cluj and then director of the Institute of Theoretical Physics and the Faculty of Technology. During 1929-1946 he served as dean of the faculty. He taught physics courses containing many modern ideas such as "Electricity and Magnetism" and "acoustics and optics," for which he published textbooks in various editions.

Maior proved to be a visionary. In 1923 he invited Hermann Oberth to defend his dissertation at the University of Cluj, after it had been rejected by the Heidelberg University as "too utopian." He put his signature on the diploma of a man who later would be widely recognized as the father of modern interplanetary rocketry.

== Distinctions ==
He was elected a member of the Romanian Academy of Sciences on 21 December 1937.

Maior founded the School of Theoretical Physics at the University of Cluj, maintaining permanent contact with the great ideas of that time and making outstanding contributions in the fields under development in Europe. These contributions were fully recognized in 1950, when Nobel laureate Louis de Broglie presented, at the Academy of Paris, a work of Maior called "Gravitational Fields and Magnetism." It was one of the last happy moments of Maior's life, which became increasingly tumultuous after 1947.

In recognition of his contribution to the development of education and research in modern physics, the physics council of the Faculty of the University of Cluj decided in March 1995 to name one of its auditoriums "The Augustin Maior Amphitheatre."

Also as an act of gratitude and respect, at the former "No.5 Reghin school," the school at which he began his education, named their gymnasium on 21 March 1994 "Augustin Maior State Gymnasium."

On 7 July 2004, the Cluj-Napoca City Hall put a memorial plaque on his childhood home, No. 9 Str. Octavian Goga.

The Technical Communications College of Cluj-Napoca also bears his name.

In 2012, Maior was posthumously elected a member of the Romanian Academy.
