= Riedel (crater) =

Crater on the Moon

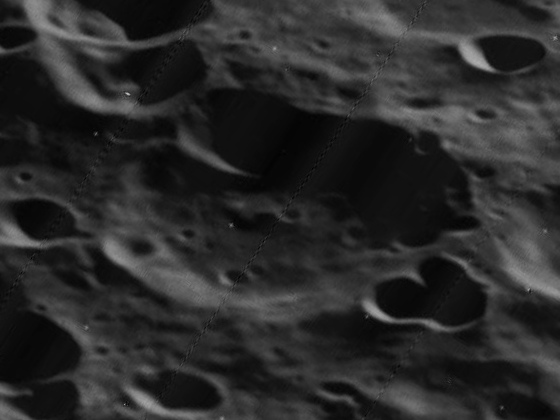
- Oblique Lunar Orbiter 5 image
- Coordinates: 48.9°S 139.6°W
- Diameter: 47 km
- Depth: Unknown
- Colongitude: 140° at sunrise
- Eponym: Klaus Riedel; Walter Riedel

Riedel is an impact crater on the far side of the Moon. It is located to the north-northeast of the crater Karrer, and due south of Leavitt.

This is a worn crater with smaller craters along the rim to the north and southwest. There is a small craterlet along the southern inner wall. The interior floor appears relatively free of distinguishing features, with only a small craterlet in the southern part of the floor.

== Satellite craters ==
By convention these features are identified on lunar maps by placing the letter on the side of the crater midpoint that is closest to Riedel.

Riedel	Latitude	Longitude	Diameter
G	49.2° S	133.6° W	26 km
Q	49.9° S	141.7° W	25 km
Z	47.4° S	139.7° W	30 km
