= Winkler (crater) =

Crater on the Moon

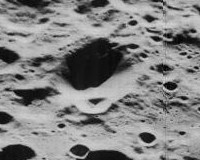
- Oblique Lunar Orbiter 5 image, facing west
- Coordinates: 42.23°N 178.81°W
- Diameter: 22.85 km (14.20 mi)
- Depth: Unknown
- Colongitude: 179° at sunrise
- Eponym: Johannes Winkler

Winkler is a small lunar impact crater on the far side of the Moon. It is located about one crater diameter to the south-southeast of Dunér. This feature forms a circular, cup-shaped depression in the surface. A small, relatively fresh crater lies across the eastern rim.

The crater was formally named by the IAU in 1970 after German rocketry scientist Johannes Winkler.

== Satellite craters ==
By convention these features are identified on lunar maps by placing the letter on the side of the crater midpoint that is closest to Winkler.

Winkler	Latitude	Longitude	Diameter
A	43.8° N	178.4° W	14 km
E	42.7° N	177.1° W	18 km
L	40.0° N	178.4° W	31 km
