= Rudolf Nebel =

German rocket scientist (1894–1978)

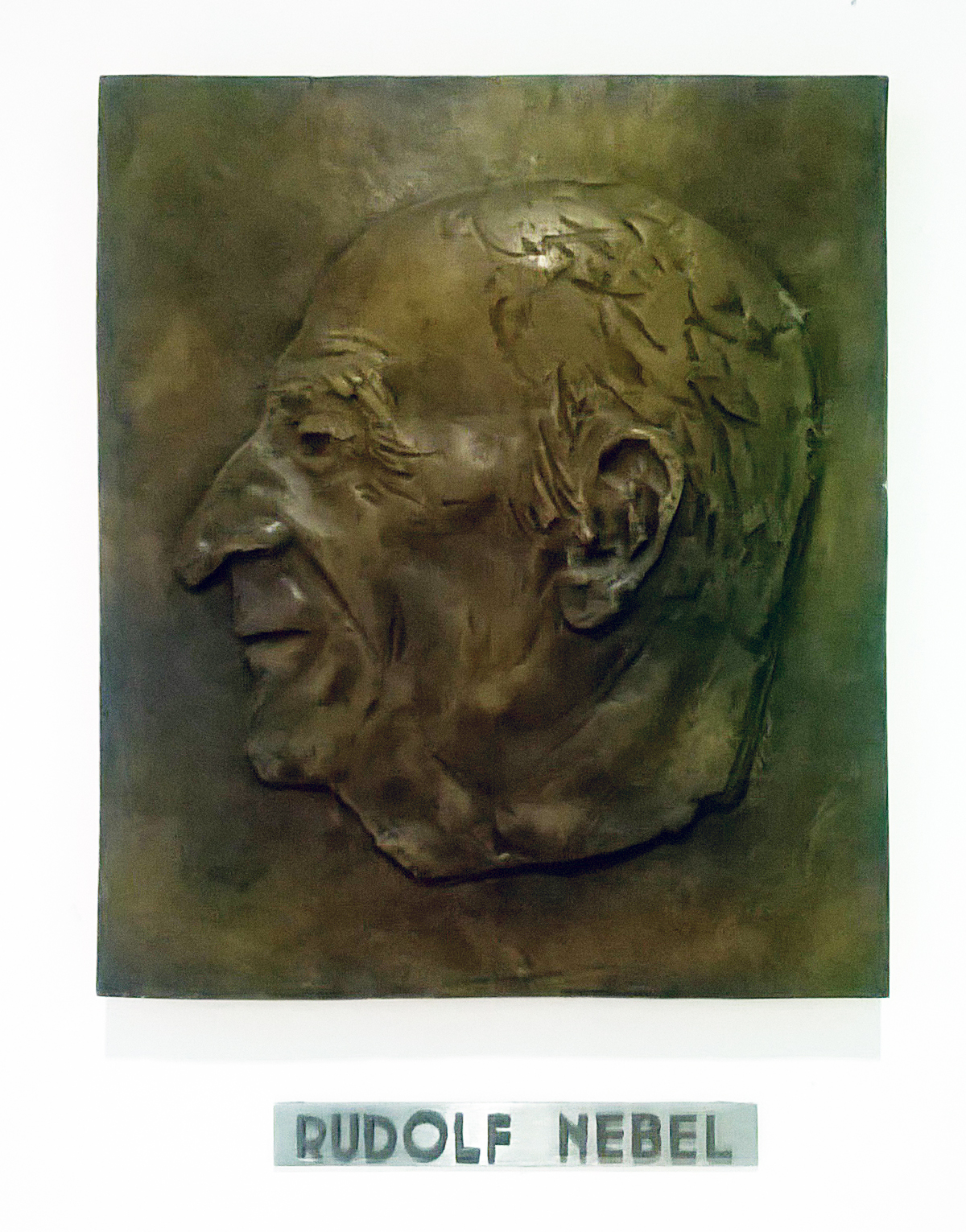
Relief of Rudolf Nebel at Berlin Tegel Airport

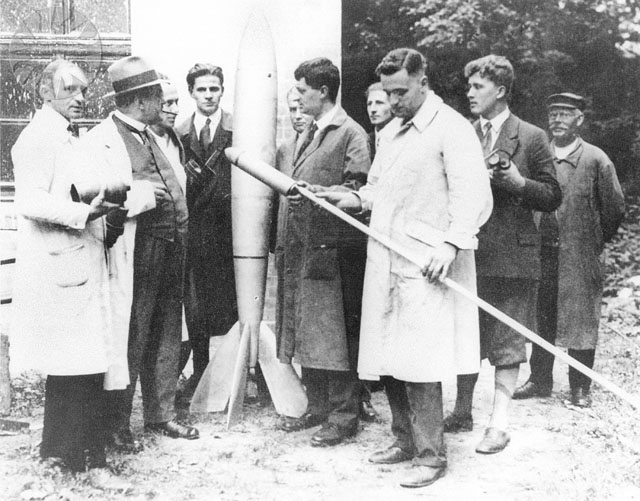
Rudolf Nebel (on the left), Hermann Oberth, Klaus Riedel, Wernher von Braun at the Raketenflugplatz, 1930

Rudolf Wilhelm "Willy" Nebel (21 March 1894 – 18 September 1978) was a German officer, WWI pilot of the Fliegertruppe and spaceflight advocate active in Germany's amateur rocket group, the Verein für Raumschiffahrt (VfR – "Spaceflight Society") in the 1930s as well as in rebuilding German rocketry following World War II.

Nebel, whose name means "fog" in German, is often incorrectly named as the inventor of the Nebelwerfer ("fog launcher") system of rocket artillery used by the Wehrmacht (German army) in World War II. This secret weapon was given its name as a disinformation strategy designed to lead spies into thinking that it was merely a device for creating a smoke screen.

== Life ==
=== Early life and involvement in World War I ===
Nebel was born in Weißenburg. On 12 July 1912, he received his Abitur from the Realgymnasium in Nuremberg, and on 15 August 1912, he obtained his pilot's license (No. 178). Nebel thus became one of the first aviators in Germany, part of the "Old Eagles" group (Alte Adler). In October 1912, he began his mechanical engineering studies at the Technical University of Munich. At the same time, he began his military service as a one-year volunteer in Munich with the Royal Bavarian Telegraph Battalion. He was discharged in September 1913 as an officer candidate. His service counted toward his studies, as he was able to attend lectures alongside his military service. When the war broke out, Nebel was already in his fourth semester.

During the First World War, he served in the Luftstreitkräfte as a fighter pilot with Jagdstaffel 5, pioneering the use of unguided air-launched signal rockets as offensive armament from German fighter aircraft in the Luftstreitkräfte while flying the Halberstadt D.II and Albatros D.III in early 1917, even forcing down two British aircraft with the improvised armament. In his autobiography, he stated that his controversial approach was internally called "Nebelwerfer". In 1915, he had been promoted to 2nd Lieutenant of the Reserves (Leutnant) and in 1917 to 1st Lieutenant of the Reserves (Oberleutnant). he not only earned both classes of the Iron Cross but also the Wound Badge in Black and the Honor Cup for the Victor in Aerial Combat.

Following the war, Nebel earned a degree in engineering at the Technical Hochschule of Munich on 19 November 1919. He wanted to get his doctorate in 1920, but his dissertation “Rocket Flight” was rejected as “utopian” and he could not find a doctoral supervisor. Until 1923, he worked as a Chief Engineer at Siemens. In 1927, he moved to Berlin and worked for the companies Siemens and Halske.

=== Activities in civilian rocketry and politics before the Second World War ===
He was an early member of the German Society for Space Travel (VfR), working closely together with persons such as Wernher von Braun, Rolf Engel, Hermann Oberth or Paul Ehmayr and assisted with the failed publicity stunt to launch a rocket at the premiere of Fritz Lang's film Frau im Mond (Woman in the Moon). Despite this failure, Nebel continued to seek sponsorship from the Reichswehr as well as individuals as diverse as Adolf Hitler and Albert Einstein.

Nebel acted very much as the group's spokesperson, organising the donation of materials from various local businesses, and negotiating with the Berlin municipal council for the use of a disused ammunition dump for the VfR's launch site or Raketenflugplatz. He later talked the Magdeburg council into funding the launch of a rocket with a human passenger on board (Magdeburger Startgerät).

His right-wing politics and affiliation with the paramilitary veterans' organization Der Stahlhelm sat easily with his promotion of the possible military uses of rockets. Despite this, he had a difficult relationship with Karl Becker of the Army Weapons Office. Becker distrusted Nebel's showmanship and publicity seeking and by May 1931 had temporarily cut off official contact with him. In April 1932, Becker accepted a proposal from Nebel for army funding of a rocket launch on the condition that certain criteria were met. The launch on 22 June of that year was a failure and Nebel and his crew received no payment for the attempt. When Becker offered to bring the team into a strictly controlled army rocketry project, Nebel refused, saying that he and his colleagues had invented the technology and that the army would "choke us with their red tape". Conversely, Wernher von Braun and others accepted the offer.

Von Braun later tried again during the war to have him join, but by now the SS regarded Nebel as untrustworthy and had von Braun cease his attempts.

=== Post-WWII career ===
After World War II, Nebel was quick to encourage Germany to recommence rocket research. He participated in the first meetings of the International Astronautical Federation and held a public lecture in Cuxhaven in 1951 that set in motion a chain of events that led to the old military base being re-opened for rocket launching until the mid-1960s. He fought in vain for compensation and recognition and was a scientific employee of the Society for Space Research in Bad Godesberg from 1963 to 1965. On 25 June 1965, he received the Order of Merit of the Federal Republic of Germany, Cross of Merit 1st Class.

In 1972, he published his self-centered autobiography Die Narren von Tegel (The Jesters of Tegel), telling his story of the Raketenflugplatz in Berlin-Tegel.

== Death ==
In 1978, Dipl.-Ing. Rudolf Nebel died in Düsseldorf and was buried in Weißenburg, Bavaria.

== Family ==
Nebel was the son of the merchant Johann-Josef Nebel (1863–1946) from Konstanz and his wife Emma Mathilde Hedwig, née Staudinger (born 1873). His mother belonged to a respected family in Weißenburg. Her father, Ernst Staudinger, a gunsmith, had made an invention to improve the needle gun during the 1870/71 war and established a factory for it. An uncle owned a bicycle shop. Thus, Nebel had his first contact with technology as a preschooler. A sister, Else, was born in 1895, and his brother, Walter, in 1899. Shortly before his brother's birth, the family moved to Munich. His father had become authorized signatory of a newly founded factory for tracked vehicles. In 1903, Nuremberg became the family's new home.

Rudolf Nebel married his fiancée Wilhelmine Anna Margarete Enzensberger (1898–1953) in Augsburg in 1920; the marriage ended in divorce in 1927. On 31 August 1978, he married Gertrude Henriette Nierhaus (born 1904) in Düsseldorf, with whom he had been in a steady relationship since 1948.
