= Bernstadt auf dem Eigen =

- Town
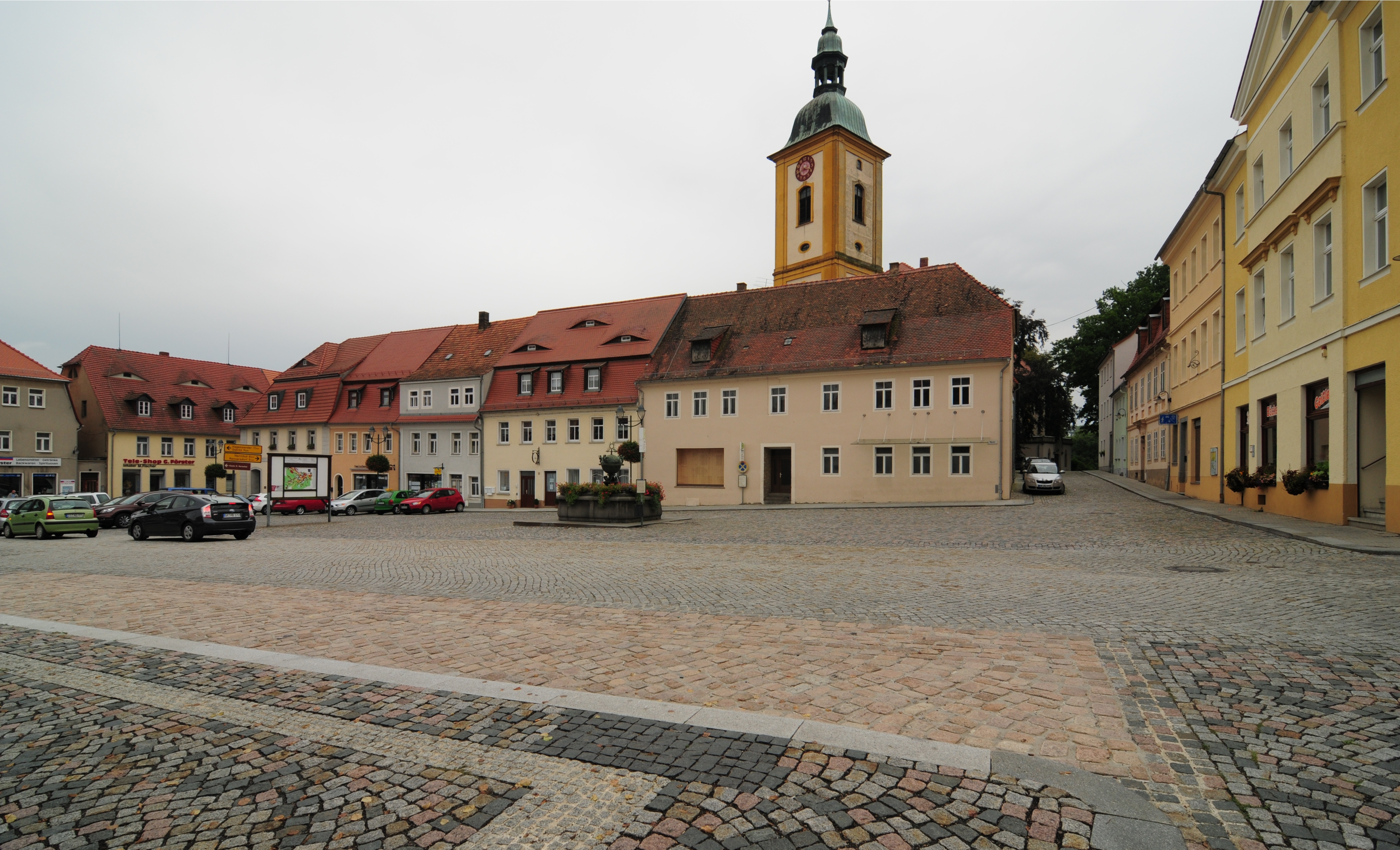
- Market Square

- Coat of arms

- Location of Bernstadt auf dem Eigen within Görlitz district
- Interactive map of Bernstadt auf dem Eigen
- Location within Germany Location within Saxony
- Coordinates: 51°2′45″N 14°49′35″E
- Country: Germany
- State: Saxony
- District: Görlitz

Government
  - Mayor (2022–29): Markus Weise (Ind.)

Area
  - Total: 52 km^{2} (20 sq mi)
- Elevation: 231 m (758 ft)

Population (2025-12-31)
  - Total: 3,083
  - Density: 59/km^{2} (150/sq mi)
- Time zone: UTC+01:00 (CET)
  - Summer (DST): UTC+02:00 (CEST)
- Postal codes: 02748
- Dialling codes: 035874
- Vehicle registration: GR, LÖB, NOL, NY, WSW, ZI
- Website: www.bernstadt.info

Bernstadt auf dem Eigen (German pronunciation: [ˈbɛʁnʃtat ʔaʊf deːm ˈʔaɪɡn̩], lit. 'Bernstadt on the Eigen'; Upper Sorbian: Bjenadźicy) is a town in the Görlitz district, in Saxony, in eastern Germany. It is situated 16 km north of Zittau, and 16 km southwest of Görlitz.

== History ==
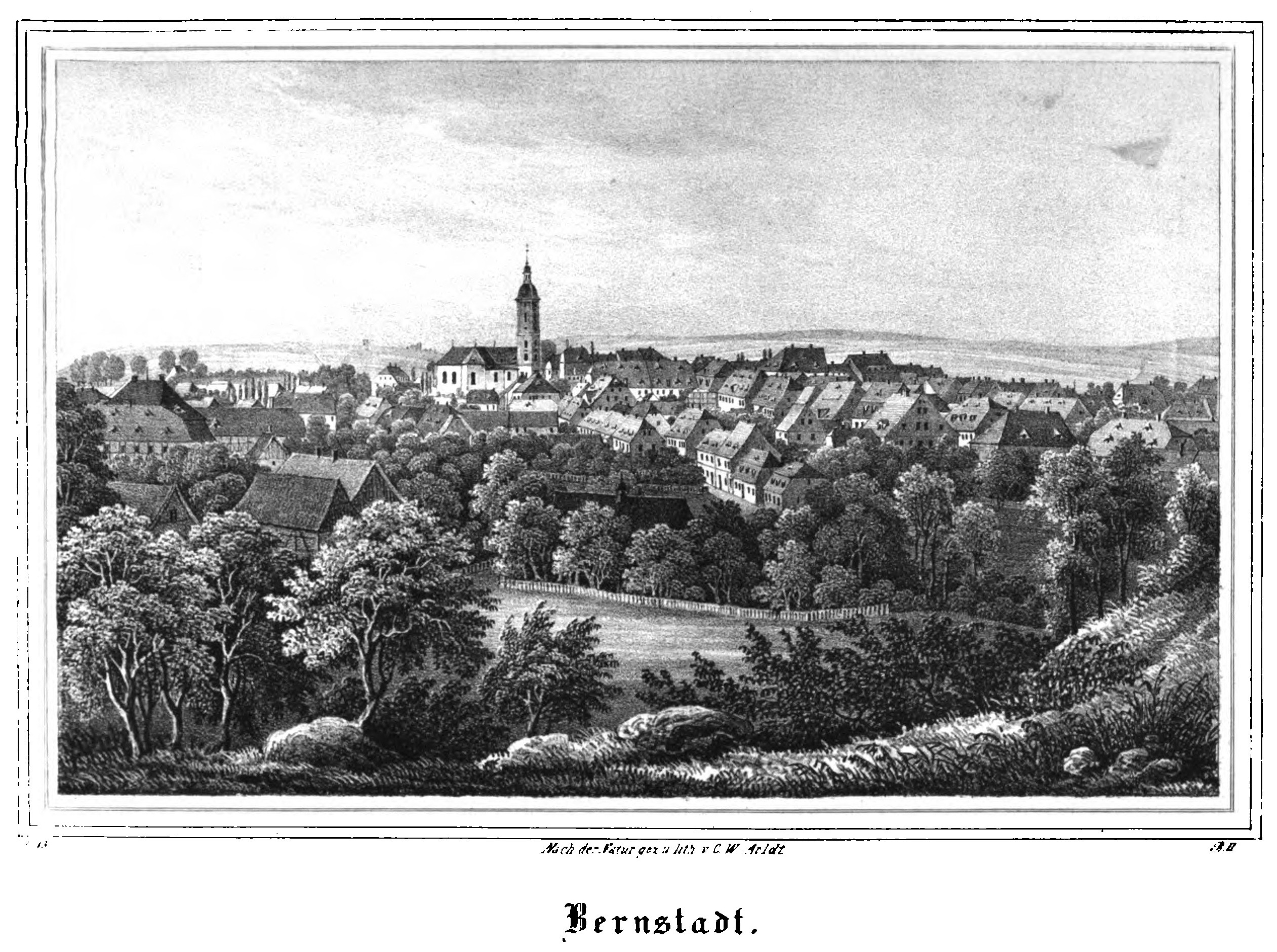
Mid-19th-century view of the town

The settlement was mentioned in a document from 1234. The local church was extended in 1250. The upper part was designated as a town for the first time in 1280. In 1285, the town became a possession of the Marienstern Abbey. The present-day district of Kunnersdorf was first mentioned in 1306. In 1319, the area became part of the Duchy of Jawor, the southwesternmost duchy of fragmented Piast-ruled Poland. In 1320 Duke Henry I of Jawor donated Kunnersdorf to the Marienstern Abbey. Later on, the town also formed part of Bohemia, Hungary and Saxony.

Within the German Empire (1871–1918), Bernstadt was part of the Kingdom of Saxony. Within the East German Bezirk Dresden, it was part of Kreis Löbau.

== Notable residents ==
- Adolf Klose (1844–1923), machine engineer, Saxon State Railroad
- Herbert Seifert (1907–1996), mathematician
- Klaus Riedel (1907–1944), rocket pioneer
