= Verein für Raumschiffahrt =

German amateur rocket association prior to World War II

- Founded: 5 June 1927, in Breslau
- Founder: Johannes Winkler, with Max Valier and Willy Ley
- Dissolved: January 1934
- Type: Professional Organization
- Location: 1930: Raketenflugplatz
- Members: approx. 500, including Space Hall of Fame inductees: Winkler, Johannes (President); Ley, Willy (Vice President); Braun, Wernher von Hohmann, Walter; Oberth, Hermann; Riedel, Klaus; Sänger, Eugen
- Periodical Die Rakete (English: The Rocket).

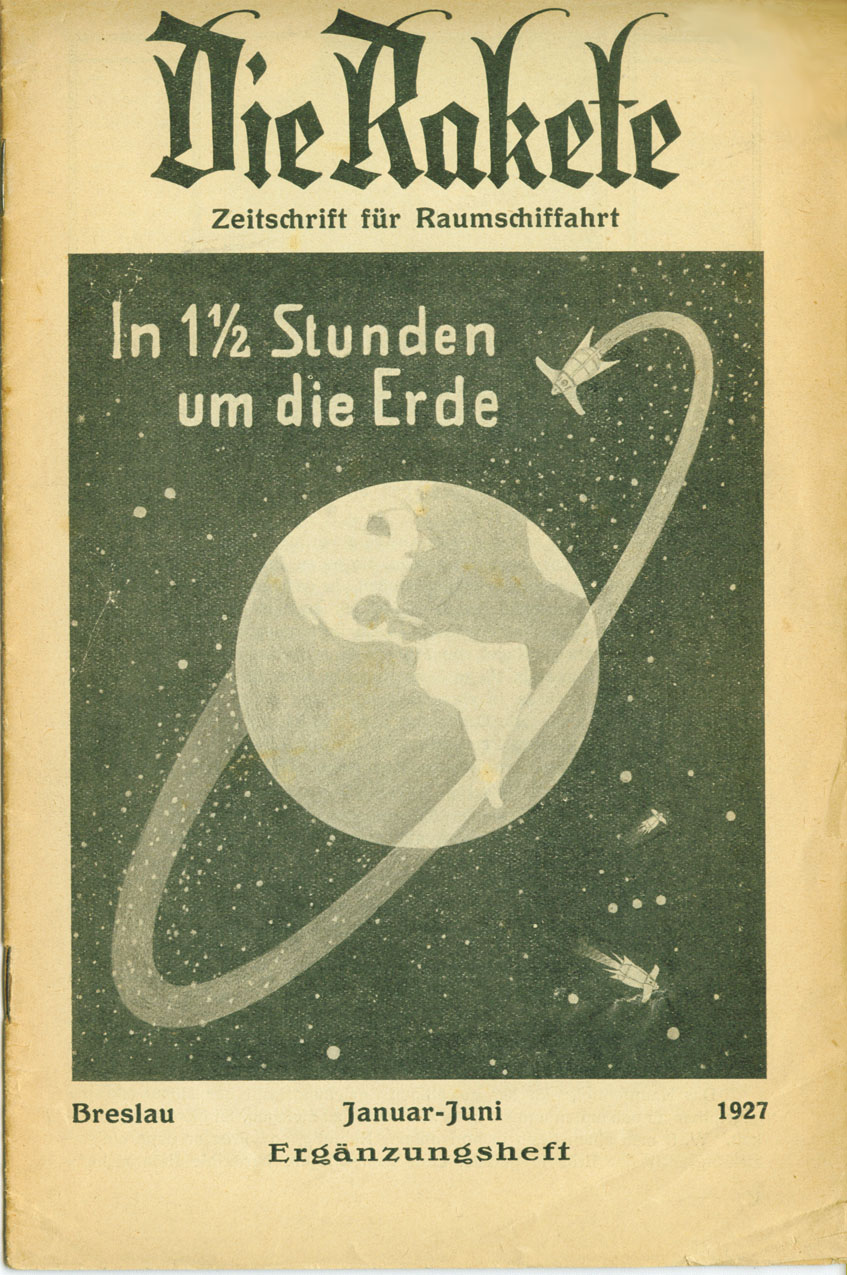
Supplementary issue of the periodical Die Rakete in 1927 (Around the Earth in an Hour and a Half)

The Verein für Raumschiffahrt ("VfR", English: Society for Space Travel) was a German amateur rocket association prior to World War II that included members outside Germany. The first successful VfR test firing with liquid fuel (five minutes) was conducted by Max Valier at the Heylandt Works on 25 January 1930; and additional rocket experiments were conducted at a farm near Bernstadt, Saxony.

Space travel and rocketry gained popularity in Germany after the June 1923 publication of Herman Oberth's book Die Rakete zu den Planetenräumen (English: The Rocket into Planetary Space) and the expanded 1929 work Wege zur Raumschiffahrt (Ways to Spaceflight).

The VfR was founded in 1927 by Johannes Winkler, with Max Valier and Willy Ley after their participation as expert advisers for Fritz Lang's early science fiction film Frau im Mond (The Woman in the Moon). Ley and Hermann Oberth had hoped to receive funding from Lang for a real-life experimental rocket launch coinciding with the movie's premiere. Valier had assisted in Fritz von Opel's rocket-powered publicity stunts for the Opel company.

In September 1930, before Hitler came to power, the VfR requested funding from the German army. Rockets were one of the few types of military development not restricted by the Versailles treaty at the end of World War I, 11 years earlier. They received permission from the municipality to use an abandoned ammunition dump at Reinickendorf, the Berlin rocket launching site (German: Raketenflugplatz Berlin). For three years the VfR launched increasingly powerful rockets of their own design from this location. Following the unsuccessful Mirak rockets, the most powerful rocket of the Repulsor series (named for a spaceship in a German novel by Kurd Lasswitz) reached altitudes over 1 km (3,000 ft).

In the spring of 1932, Captain Walter Dornberger, his commander (Captain Ritter von Horstig), and Colonel Karl Heinrich Emil Becker viewed a (failed) VfR launch, and Dornberger subsequently issued a contract for a demonstration launch. Wernher von Braun, who was then a young student and had joined the group two years earlier, was in favor of the contract. The group eventually rejected the proposal and the dissension caused during its consideration contributed to the society dissolving itself in January 1934. The society's demise was also the result of an inability to find funding, and Berlin's civic authorities becoming concerned with rocketry experiments so close to the city.

The only known VfR rocket artifact is a rejected aluminium Repulsor nozzle which member Herbert Schaefer took to the US when he emigrated in 1935 and which he donated to the Smithsonian Institution in 1978.
