= Walter Riedel =

German-British rocket scientist (1902–1968)

Walter Julius Hermann "Papa" Riedel
- Born: 5 December 1902; Königs Wusterhausen, German Empire
- Died: 15 May 1968 (aged 65); East Berlin, East Germany
- Scientific career
- Fields: Aerospace engineering
- Workplaces: Heylandt Company; Peenemünde; RPD Westcott / Aylesbury

Walter J H "Papa" Riedel ("Riedel I") (December 5, 1902–May 15, 1968) was a German-British engineer and rocket scientist who was the head of the Design Office of the Army Research Centre Peenemünde and the chief designer of the A4 (V-2) ballistic rocket. The crater Riedel on the Moon was named for both him and the unrelated German rocket pioneer Klaus Riedel.

Klaus Riedel ("Riedel II") and Walther Johannes Riedel ("Riedel III") were also Peenemünde engineers.

== Biography ==
At Heylandt Company beginning on 27 February 1928, Riedel was in December 1929 responsible for the development of liquid propellant rocket motors, and initially collaborated with Max Valier who had joined the company at that date. Riedel took over full responsibility for the rocket motor development in 1930, after Valier's untimely death following a rocket motor explosion during a test using paraffin oil (kerosene) as fuel instead of ethyl alcohol.

In 1934, research and development of the Heylandt Company was taken over by the Army and amalgamated with the Wernher von Braun Group at the Army Proving Grounds at Kummersdorf, near Berlin, in order to carry out research and development of long-range rocket missiles. In March 1936, von Braun and Walter Riedel began consideration of much larger rockets than the A3 (under development at that time), which was merely a test vehicle and could not carry any payload. Along with Walter Dornberger, plans were drawn up for a more suitable and better equipped test site for large rockets at Peememünde, to take the place of the rather confined Kummersdorf. From 17 May 1937, following the transfer of the rocket activities from Kummersdorf to the Army's new rocket establishment at Peenemünde, Riedel headed the Technical Design Office as chief designer of the A4 (V2) ballistic rocket

After the air raid by the British Royal Air Force (Operation Hydra) on Peenemünde in August 1943, the transfer of the development facility was ordered to a location giving better protection from air attack. The air raid had killed Dr Walter Thiel (propulsion chief) and Erich Walther (chief of maintenance for the workshops), two leading men at the Peenemünde Army facilities. In mid-September 1943, Riedel and two others surveyed the Austrian Alps for a new site for rocket development to replace that at Peenemünde. The chosen location was at Ebensee, on the southern end of the Traunsee, 100 km east of Salzburg. The site consisted of a system of galleries driven into the mountains, and received the code name Zement (Cement). Work on the site started at the beginning of 1944 and was intended to be completed in October 1945. From 1 October 1943, Riedel was responsible for supervising the transfer, to Ebensee, of the Peenemünde development facility.

From 29 May 1945 to 20 September 1945, following the end of World War II, Riedel was held in protective custody (Sicherheitshaft) at the US Third Army's internment camp at Deggendorf, situated between Regensburg and Passau. From 1 November 1945 to 10 March 1946, he was employed by the Ministry of Supply (MoS) establishment at Altenwalde (near Cuxhaven), and from 11 March to 31 July 1946, at the MoS establishment at Trauen (near Braunschweig). After the Trauen establishment was disbanded, Riedel emigrated to England, to work initially (from 1947) at the Royal Aircraft Establishment, Farnborough, and later, from 1948 until his death in 1968, at the MoS Rocket Propulsion Establishment in Westcott (near Aylesbury, Buckinghamshire). In 1957, Riedel became a British citizen.

Riedel died while visiting East Berlin in East Germany.
