= Wege zur Raumschiffahrt =

Oberth's pioneering book on space travel

Wege zur Raumschiffahrt (Ways to space travel) is a book by Hermann Oberth. Written in German, it was published in 1929 by the Munich Oldenbourg publishing house and was considered a standard work in rocketry for a long time. It was the 3rd edition of Oberth's first book Die Rakete zu den Planetenräumen (The Rocket to Planetary Spaces), published in 1923.

[Oberth] translates the dream of space travel that has been cherished by humanity for centuries into the language of formulas and construction designs.

— Elie Carafoli

Computers did during this time to perform the calculations necessary. However, this work and its formulas were reputedly used in research, development and teaching in space technology because as Oberth says “you can read from the formulas what really matters, how things are connected and how to find the best middle ground between all of this.”

== Contents ==
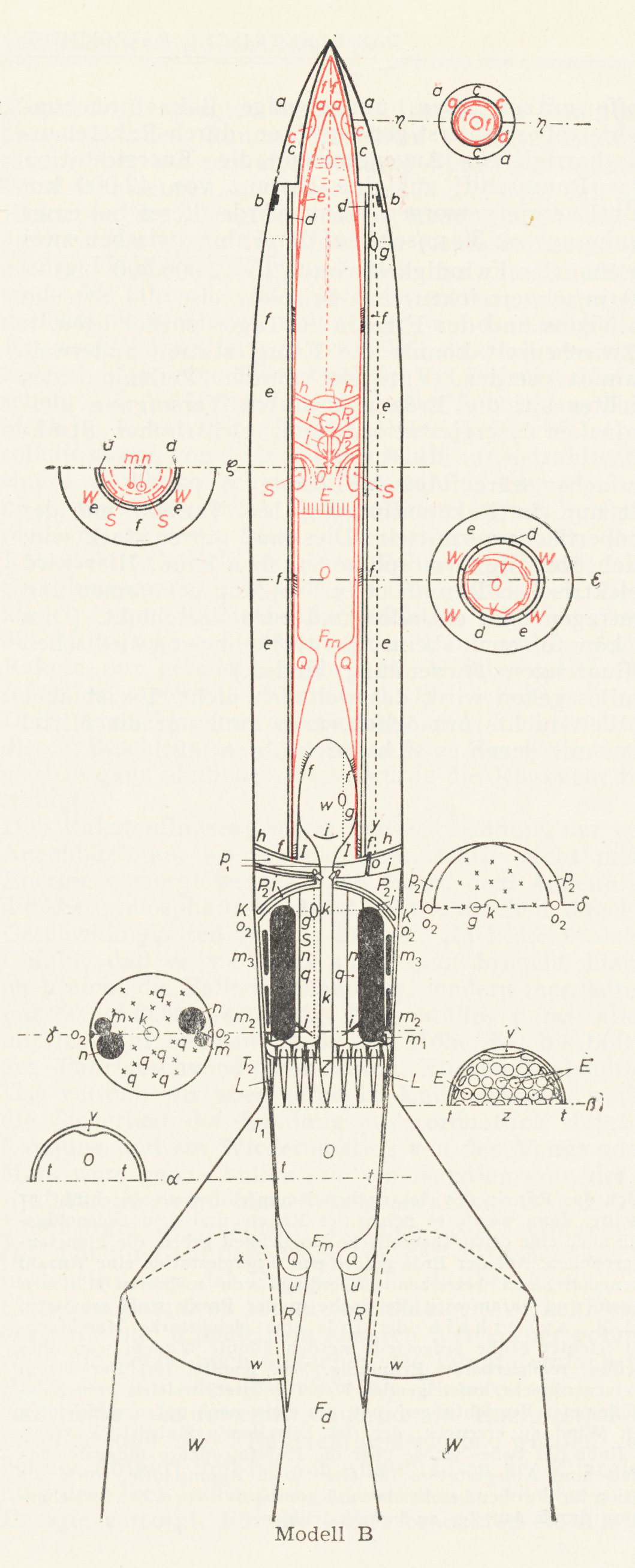
Oberth's Model B design for a two-stage rocket.

The work is divided into four parts. The first part deals in general terms with the principles of recoil propulsion and its operation in space. His starting point are four assumptions that could not be verified at the time and were therefore controversial:

1. It is possible to build machines that can climb higher than the atmosphere can reach.
2. With further improvement, these machines can reach such speeds that - if left to their own devices in the ether - they do not have to fall back to the earth's surface and are even able to leave the earth's area of attraction.
3. Such machines can be built in such a way that people can ride up with them (probably without any health disadvantage).
4. Under current conditions, building such machines would be worthwhile.

In the second part (Physical-technical issues) and third part (Construction issues), Oberth describes in detail his principles of rocket propulsion using liquid fuels. He often simplifies the mathematical derivations and formulas by using approximations for certain quantities that were easier to treat mathematically. Where the values for the formula quantities were still uncertain, Oberth always calculated using unfavorable assumptions in order to be sure that his rockets could achieve the required performance. In designing a 100-ton space rocket, Oberth was the first to arrive at a three-stage rocket and to calculate the optimal ratio between the different stages.

In the fourth part Oberth discusses possible uses of his rockets, including uses of the liquid fuel rocket nozzle on earth and in rocket planes. He then calculates and describes rockets that not only ascend, but can also return to Earth afterwards –- similar to the later space shuttle.

Calculations and designs for space stations follow. He proposed numerous uses for such stations, many of which would later become reality, including global communication using satellites that receive and send signals, observation of the earth's surface, especially that of unexplored countries, support of maritime navigation (by warning of icebergs), observation of meteorological data for weather forecasting, and using a space station as a stopover and fuel depot for transportation to other planets. He also described solar sails for stabilizing and propelling satellites.

Oberth foresaw and developed concepts for generating energy in space for use on Earth using mirrors or electrical waves (microwaves). This concept was taken up again in feasibility studies in the United States from 1968 under the name Solar Power Satellite (SPS) and has since been viewed as technically feasible in principle. Finally, Oberth discusses the requirements and technical possibilities for traveling to foreign bodies (moon, asteroids, Mars, Venus, etc.), with an emphasis on the use of an electric spaceship. The technology used here is now known and tested as ion drive.

== Editions ==
NASA's 1972 English translation Ways To Spaceflight

The first edition appeared in 1923 with the title Die Rakete zu den Planetenräumen (The Rocket to Planetary Spaces). The work sparked heated debate, known at the time as the Battle of the Many Formulas. The second edition was published in 1925 and was sold out after a short time. The third, expanded edition appeared in 1929 with the new title Wege zur Raumschiffahrt (Ways to space travel). In the years that followed, the book became a standard text in space research and rocketry. In 1960 the book was republished under the original title Die Rakete zu den Planetenräumen. In 1972 NASA issued an authorized English translation. In 1974, Kriterion Verlag, Bucharest, published the new edition of Ways to space travel, with a foreword by Elie Carafoli and updated notes by the author.

== Recognition ==
In 1929, the International Prize for Space Sciences (REP-Hirsch Prize) in Paris was awarded for the first time to Hermann Oberth. In the years that followed, the book became the standard work on space research and rocketry and was called the “Bible of scientific astronautics” by the French aviation and rocket pioneer Robert Esnault-Pelterie. (see p. 117). Oberth's former student, Wernher von Braun, wrote in the foreword to the 4th edition of “The Rocket to Planetary Spaces” in 1964: “Hermann Oberth was the first to use a slide rule and work through numerical concepts in connection with the idea of a real space journey and presented construction designs. ... Hermann Oberth not only solved the theoretical problems of rocket science and designed the necessary technology so that people can penetrate into space, live and work there. He was also determined to make all of these possibilities a reality. Therefore, he is undoubtedly the father of space travel.” (pages 17–18).
