= Klaus Riedel =

German rocket scientist (1907–1944)

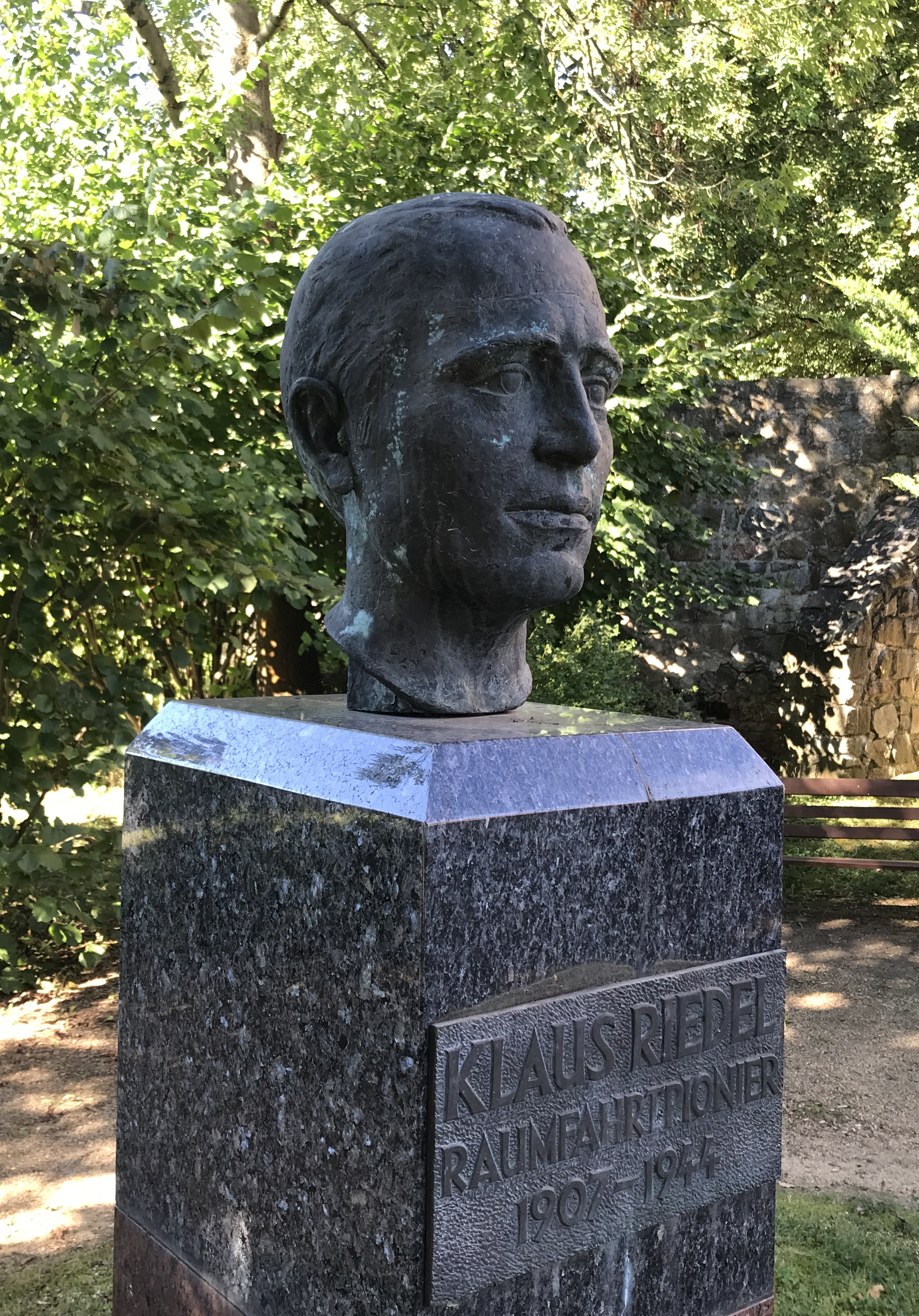
Klaus Riedel monument in Bernstadt auf dem Eigen

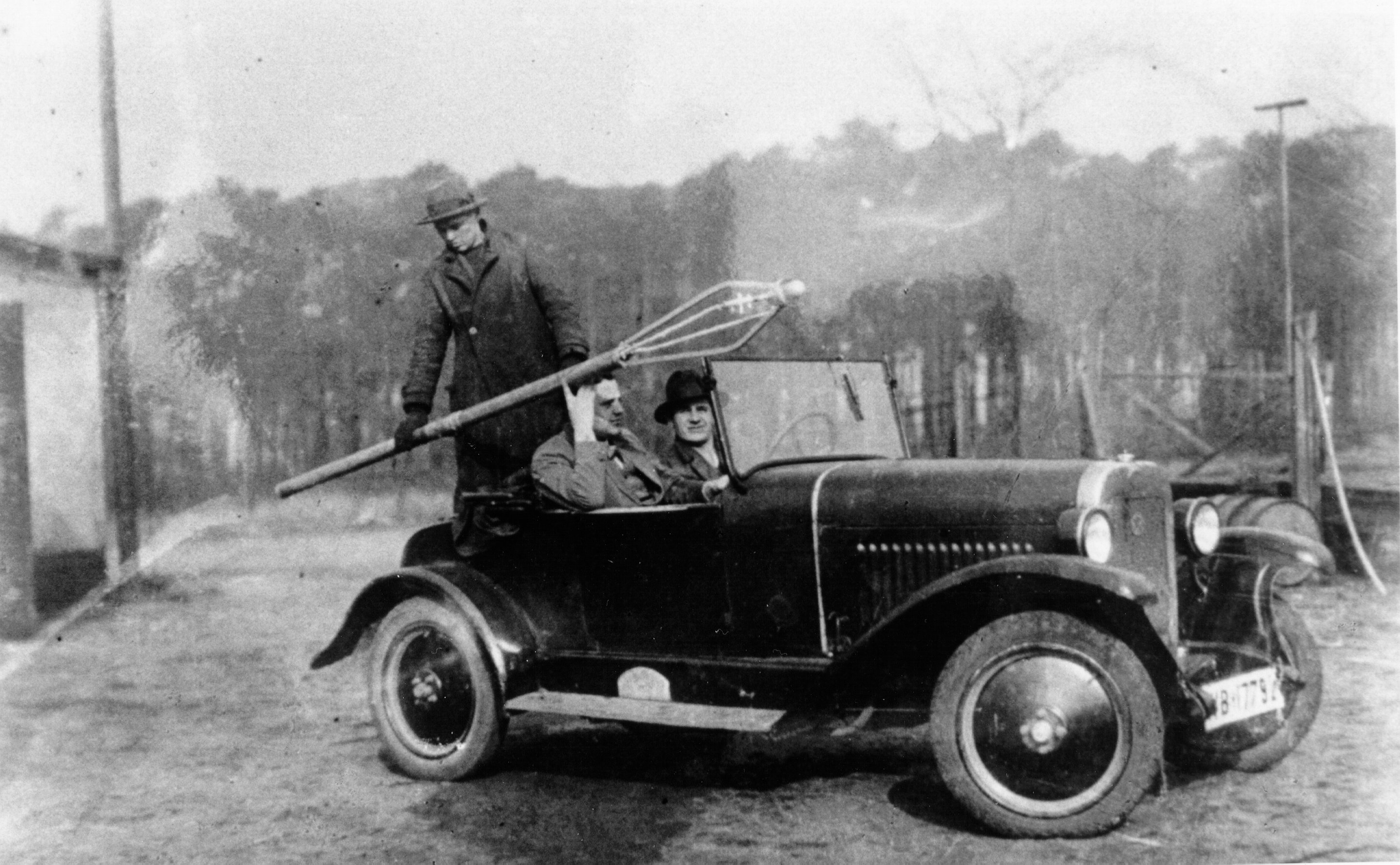
Paul Ehmayr, Klaus Riedel and Wernher von Braun (driver) riding an Opel Laubfrosch

Klaus Riedel (2 August 1907 – 4 August 1944) was a German rocket pioneer. He was involved in many early liquid-fuelled rocket experiments, and eventually worked on the V-2 missile programme at Peenemünde Army Research Center. A lunar crater is named after him in recognition of his contributions to rocket research.

== History ==
Riedel was born in Wilhelmshaven, the son of a naval officer. His mother died when he was twelve years old, and his father two years later. The orphaned Riedel was raised by his uncle in Berlin. In 1923, Riedel began an apprenticeship as an electrician in Berlin and completed it with a journeyman's certificate. He then attended “Dr. Heil's private school” in Berlin from April 1927 to April 1928. From April 1928 to October 1929, he attended general mechanical engineering lectures at the Technische Hochschule Berlin-Charlottenburg. He attended a public lecture on rocketry by Rudolf Nebel on behalf of Germany's amateur rocket group, the Verein für Raumschiffahrt (VfR – "Spaceflight Society") and joined the group which included others such as Rolf Engel, Rudolf Nebel, Hermann Oberth or Paul Ehmayr, straight away, becoming very active in its efforts to build a working rocket based on liquid oxygen and gasoline, initially providing his grandmother's farm in Bernstadt as a testing ground. Together with Nebel, he founded the activities of the Berlin rocket launching site and met Wernher von Braun. His work eventually resulted in the Mirak and Repulsor rockets. In May 1931, the first German liquid-propellant rocket was launched and missiles were tested at altitudes of up to 1,000 meters.

In May 1932, Riedel became a founding member of the Panterra society for international projects of large-scale peaceful research, as initiated by Albert Einstein and headed by Friedrich Simon Archenhold. He was also a member of the German League for Human Rights until it was banned by the Nazi Party in 1933.

After the VfR disbanded in 1933, Riedel refused to join Wernher von Braun in the army's rocket programme and worked for Siemens. He accepted von Braun's offer only in August 1937 after the army paid compensation for a 1931 rocketry patent "Thrust Engine for Liquid Propellants" owned by him and Rudolf Nebel. Riedel was called "Riedel II", and his initial position in Peenemünde was "Head of the Test Laboratory". From 1941, he was mostly concerned with developing the mobile support equipment for the V-2 and became "Head of Ground Equipment" .

Riedel had been under SD surveillance since the beginning of Nazi Germany in 1933. A Gestapo report of March 1944 stated that he, Wernher von Braun, and his colleague Helmut Gröttrup were said to have expressed regret at an engineer's house one evening that they were not working on a spaceship and that they felt the war was not going well; this was considered a "defeatist" attitude. A young female dentist who was an SS spy reported their comments. Combined with Himmler's false charges that they were communist sympathizers and had attempted to sabotage the V-2 program, the Gestapo detained them on 21 March 1944, and took them to a Gestapo cell in Stettin (now Szczecin, Poland), where they were held for two weeks without knowing the charges against them. Major-General Walter Dornberger, military head of Peenemünde, and major Hans Georg Klamroth, representative for counterintelligence at Peenemünde, obtained their conditional release so that the V-2 program could continue.

Klaus Riedel was killed in a mysterious car accident on a straight road near Zinnowitz two days after his thirty-seventh birthday when travelling home from work. He left behind his wife Irmgard Kutwin and an 18 month old daughter.

== Dedications ==
There is a memorial with Riedel's bust in Kirchgasse 11 and a small museum nearby, dedicated to him in Bernstadt where he started his first Minimum rocket in 1930. In 1970, a crater on the Moon was named after him and Walter Riedel ("Riedel I", not related to him).
