= Berlin rocket launching site =

Coordinates: 52°33′N 13°18′E

Rocket Launch Site Berlin (Raketenflugplatz Berlin) was the launch site of the Space Club (Verein für Raumschiffahrt) in Berlin-Reinickendorf at 52°33' N and 13°18' E directly adjacent to the current site of the Airport Berlin-Tegel in an area that is now Cité Pasteur. It was inaugurated in September 1930, using the site and the buildings of a disused French ammunitions depot which Rudolf Nebel managed to rent from the Prussian war ministry.

The Space Club used the four-square-kilometer area to develop and test two models of liquid fuel rockets, Mirak and Repulsor. Many of the rockets failed, but some reached altitudes of approximately 100 metres, and later, 4000 metres. On 30 September 1933, Rocket Launch Site Berlin closed under the pretext of an unpaid water bill. Subsequently, the Nazi-era military took over and classified the nascent research into rocket technology.

According to Nebel, the tests of the rocket engines were audible as from as far away as Potsdamer Platz and over time attracted considerable attention from the press who dubbed the team of engineers The Fools of Tegel ("Die Narren von Tegel").
