= Deutsches Museum =

World's largest museum of science and technology

Coordinates: 48°07′48″N 11°35′00″E

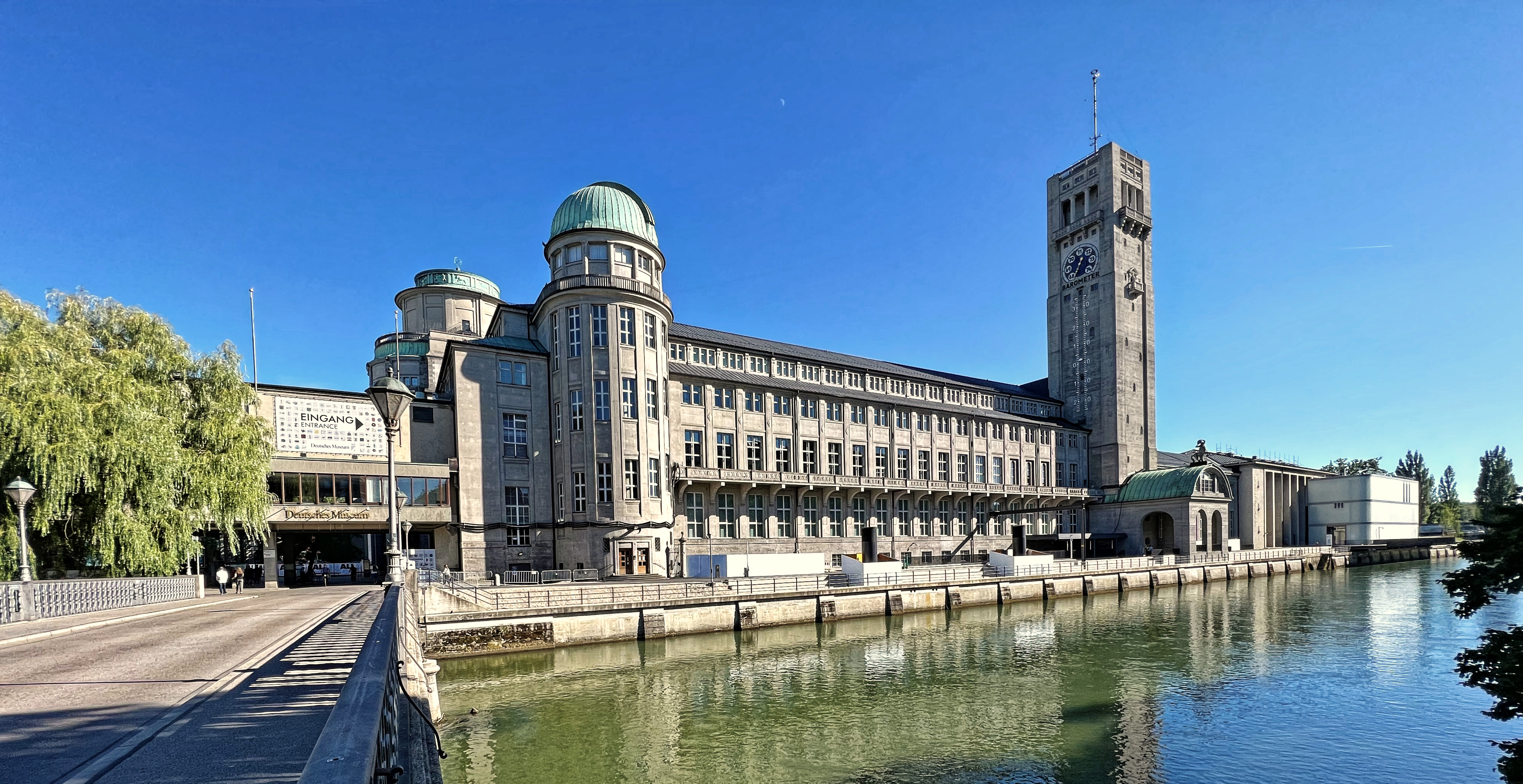
- Deutsches Museum (2022)
- Established: 28 June 1903
- Location: Museumsinsel 1; 80538 München; Germany
- Type: Science museum; Technology museum
- Collection size: 125,000
- Visitors: 1.5 million
- Website: www.deutsches-museum.de/en/

The Deutsches Museum (German Museum, officially Deutsches Museum von Meisterwerken der Naturwissenschaft und Technik (English: German Museum of Masterpieces of Science and Technology)) in Munich, Germany, is the world's largest museum of science and technology, with about 125,000 exhibited objects from 50 fields of science and technology. It receives about 1.5 million visitors per year.

The museum was founded on 28 June 1903, at a meeting of the Association of German Engineers (VDI) as an initiative of Oskar von Miller. It is the largest museum in Munich. For a period of time the museum was also used to host pop and rock concerts including The Who, Jimi Hendrix and Elton John.

== Museumsinsel ==
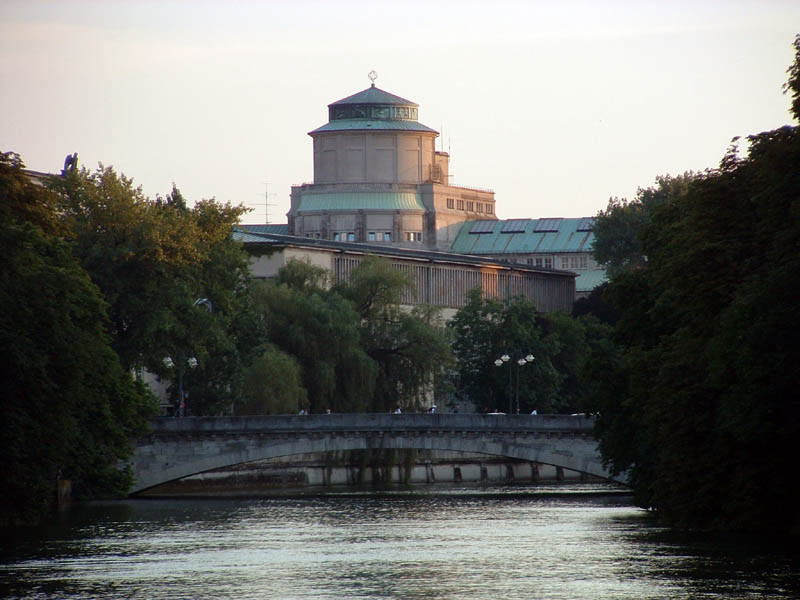
Deutsches Museum, view of the museum island

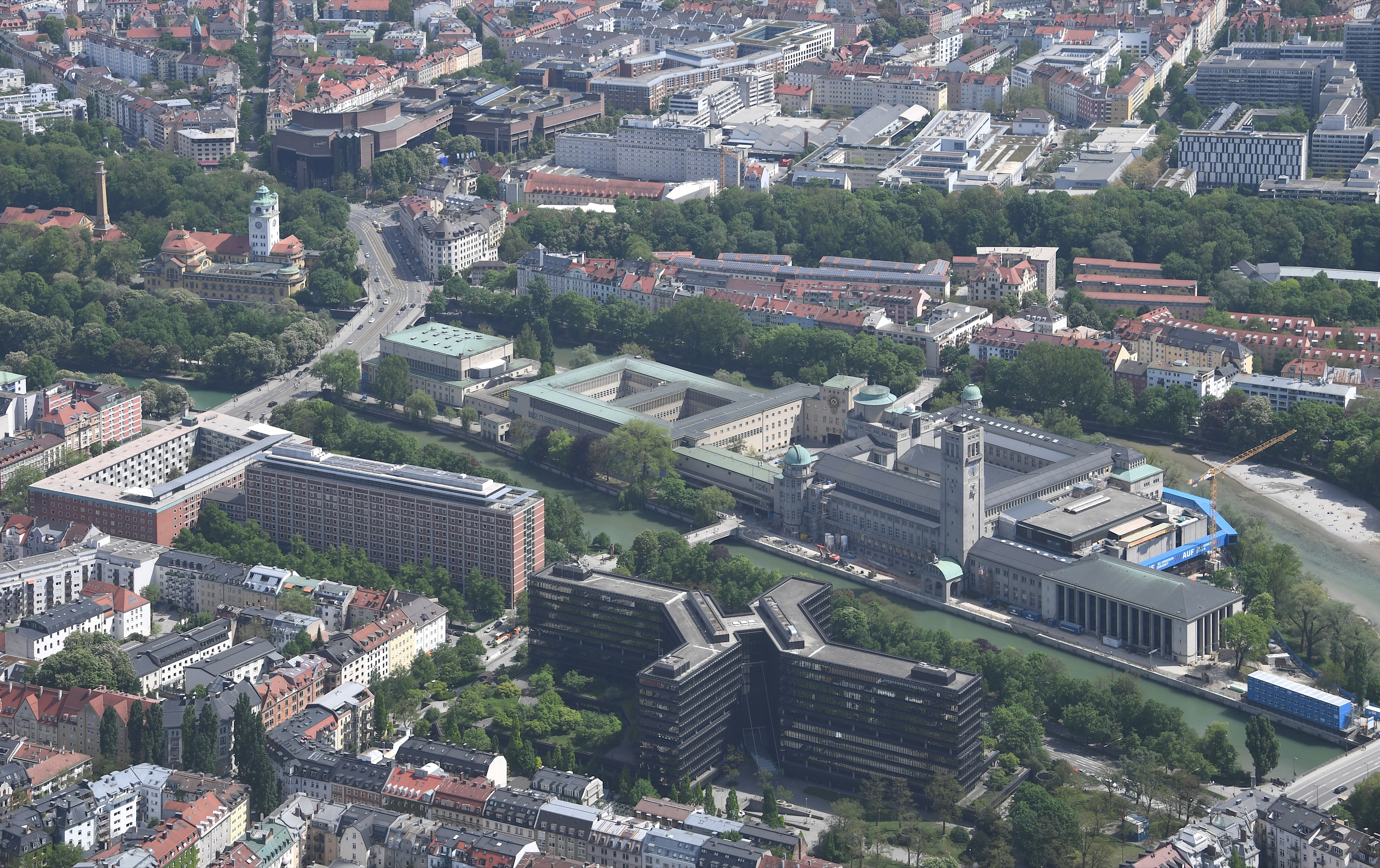
Aerial image of the Deutsches Museum (center). Below, one of the arms of the river Isar can be seen, in between which the Museumsinsel (museum island) is located. Close to the lower border of the image is the dark-coloured headquarters of the European Patent Office.

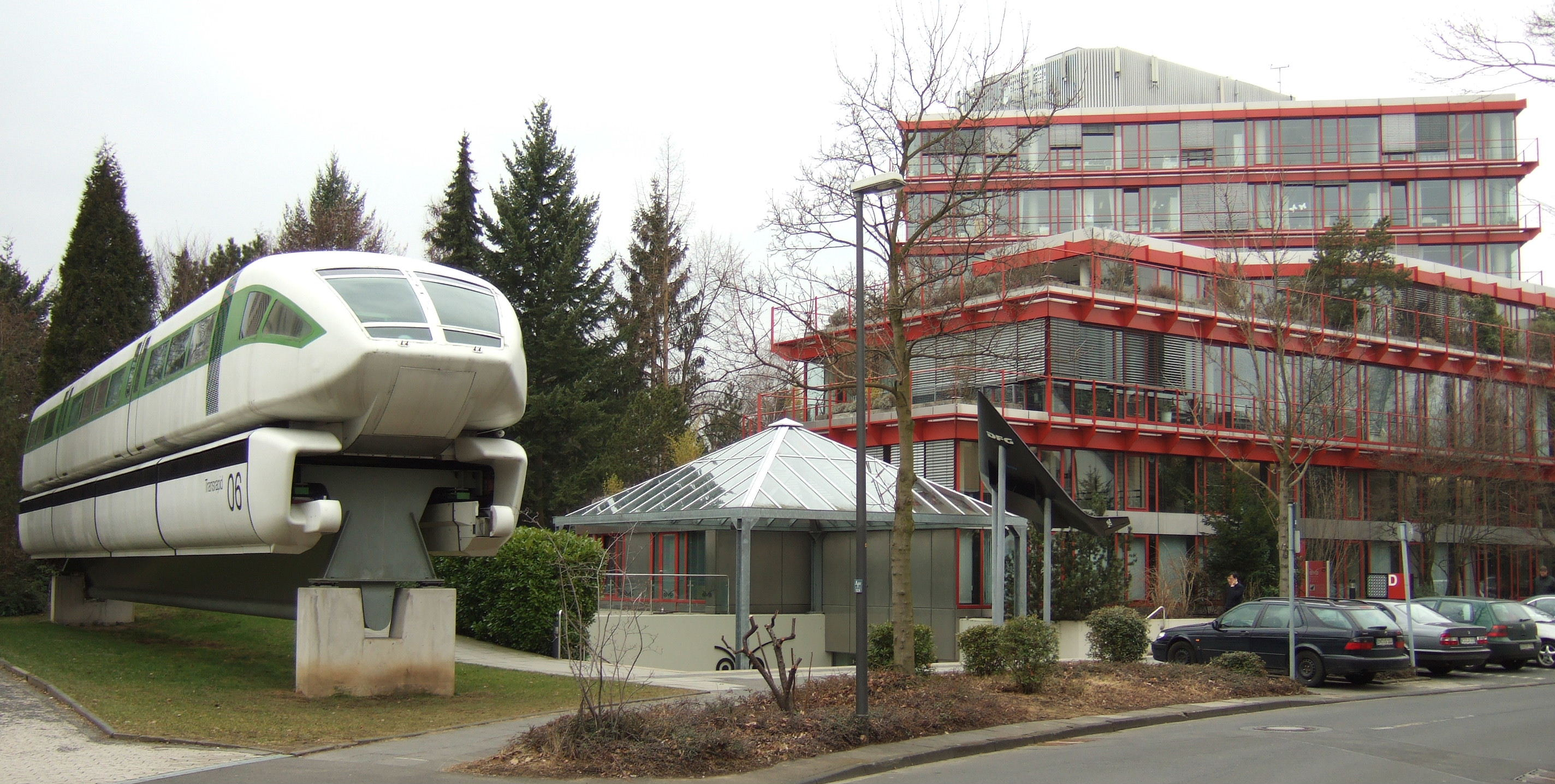
Deutsches Museum Bonn

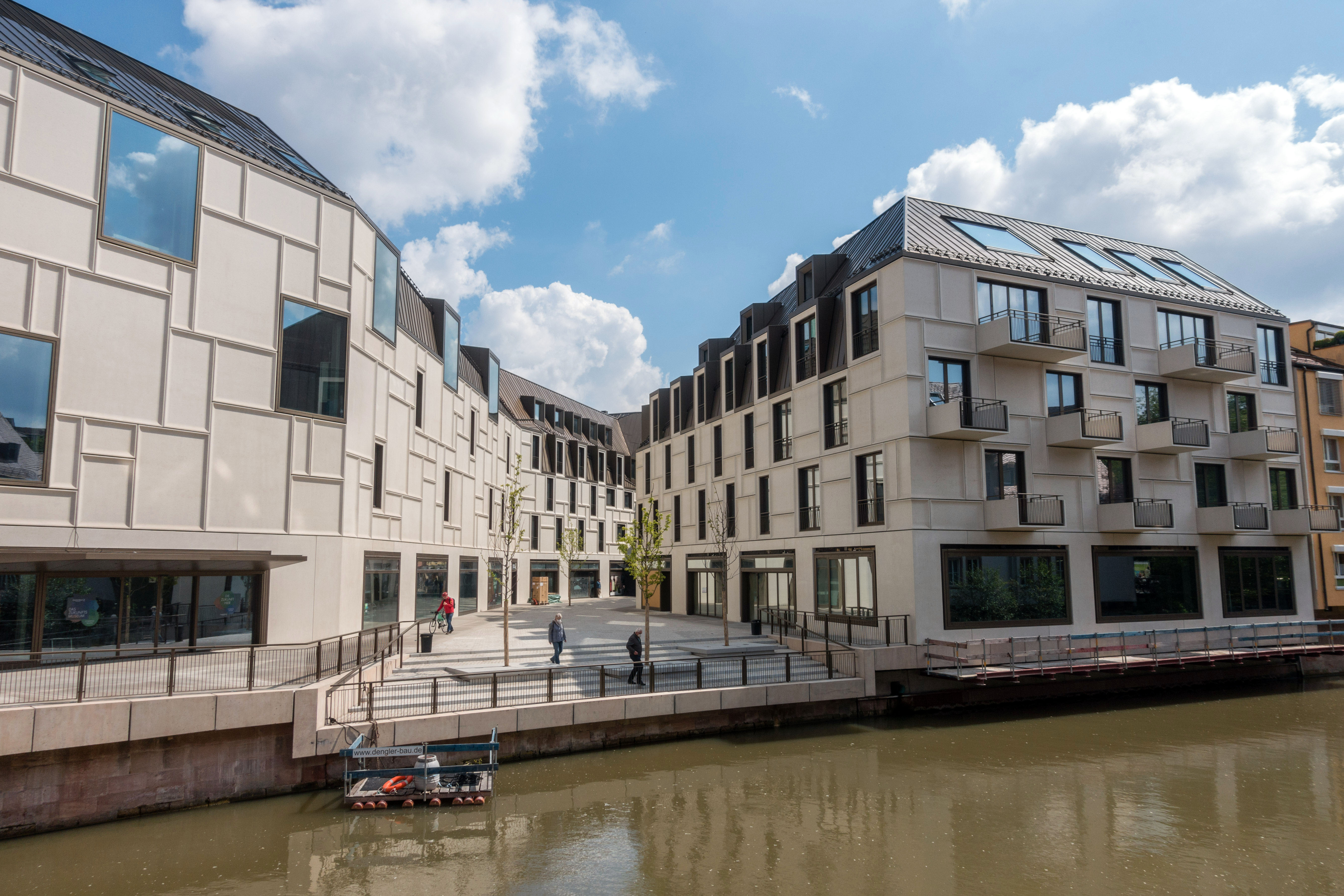
Deutsches Museum Nuremberg

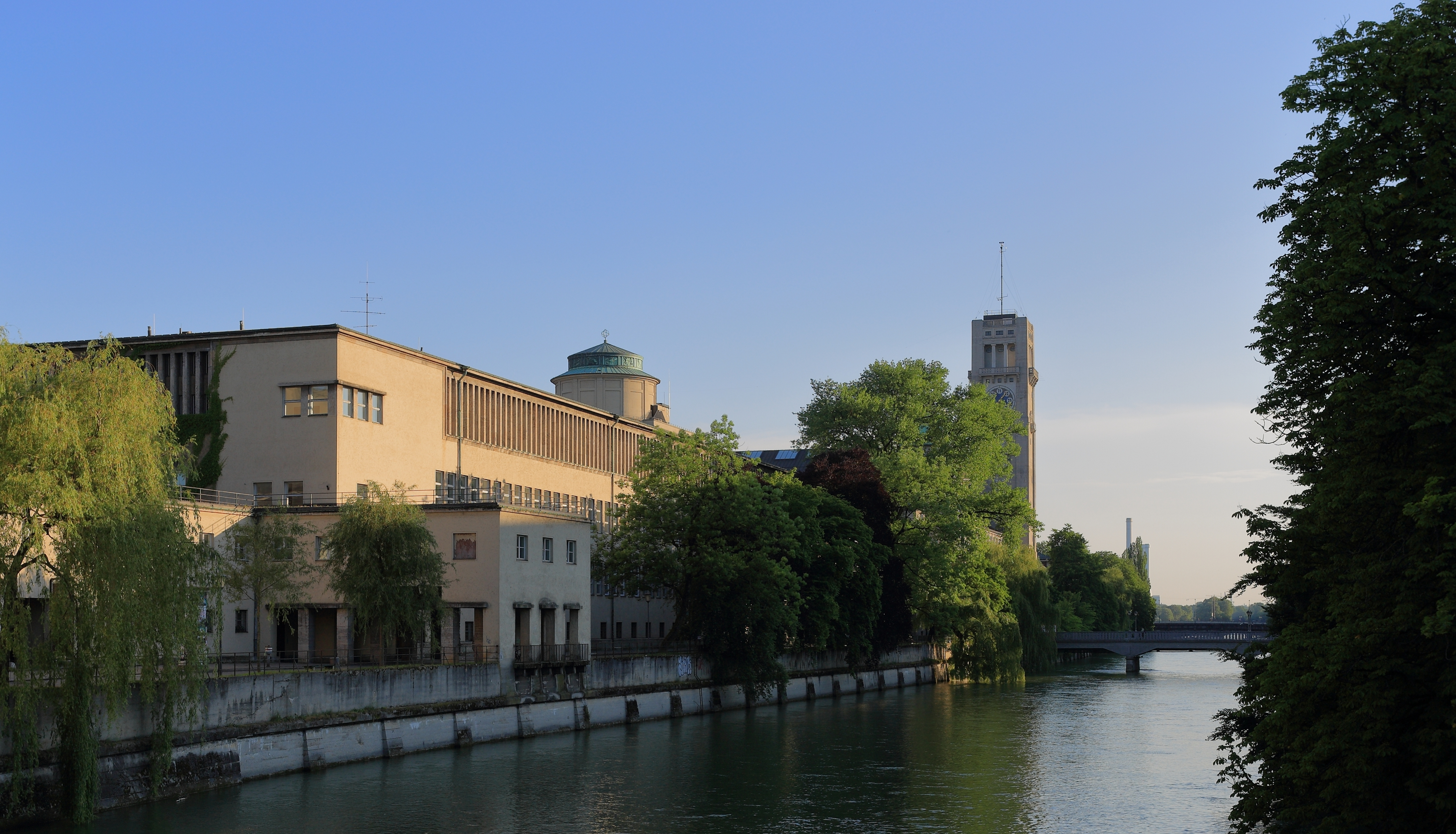
Deutsches Museum as seen from Ludwigsbrücke

The main site of the Deutsches Museum is a small island in the Isar river, which had been used for rafting wood since the Middle Ages. The island did not have any buildings before 1772 because it was regularly flooded prior to the building of the Sylvensteinspeicher.

In 1772 the Isar barracks were built on the island and, after the flooding of 1899, the buildings were rebuilt with flood protection. In 1903 the city council announced that they would donate the island for the newly built Deutsches Museum. The island formerly known as Kohleninsel (coal island) was then renamed Museumsinsel.

== Other sites ==
In addition to the main site on the Museumsinsel, the museum has two branches in and near Munich, one in Bonn, and one in Nuremberg.

The Flugwerft Schleißheim branch is located some 18 kilometres (11 miles) north of Munich's city centre close to Schleißheim Palace. It is based on the premises of one of the first military airbases in Germany founded just before World War I. It comprises the old air control and command centre as well as modern buildings added in the late 2000s after strong endorsement from Franz Josef Strauß, former prime minister of the state of Bavaria (1978 to 1988), who was a passionate flyer. The Flugwerft Schleißheim displays various interesting airplanes for which there was insufficient room at the Museumsinsel site in downtown Munich, and also several which were moved from their former places in the main museum. Among the more prominent exhibits is a Horten flying wing glider built in the 1940s, restored from the few surviving parts. A collection of the German constructions of VTOL (vertical take off and landing) planes developed in the 1950s and 1960s is unique. A range of Vietnam era fighter planes as well as Russian planes taken over from East Germany after the reunification are on display. This outstation also features a workshop dedicated to the restoration of all types of airplanes intended for static display.

In 2003, the Deutsches Museum Verkehrszentrum was opened. Located at Theresienhöhe in Munich it focuses on transportation technology.

The branch located in Bonn was opened in 1995 and focuses on German technology, science and research after 1945.

The latest opening of a branch was the Deutsches Museum Nuremberg - "Das Zukunftsmuseum", in September 2021. It focuses on future technology and its impact on humans and society.

== Oskar von Miller ==
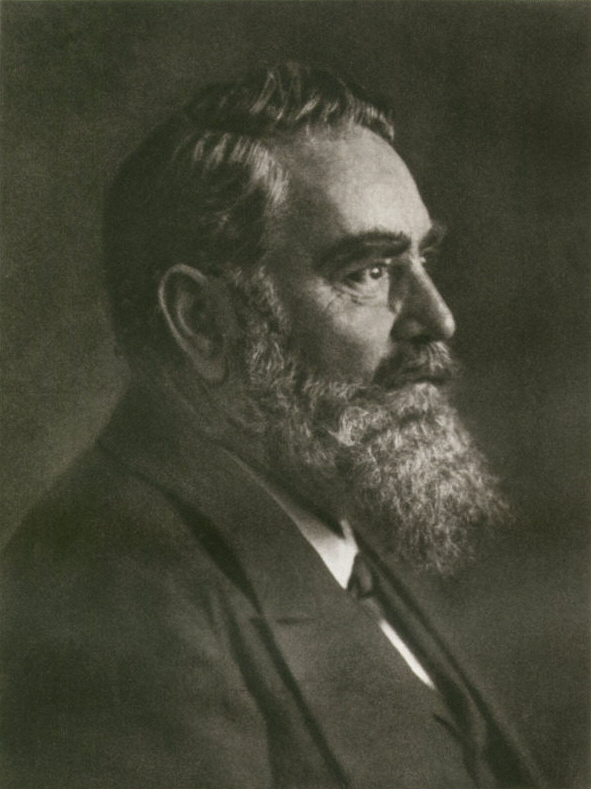
Oskar von Miller

Oskar von Miller studied electrical engineering and is otherwise known for building the first high voltage line from Miesbach to Munich (57 km) in 1882 for the electrical technology exhibition at the Glaspalast in Munich. In 1883 he joined AEG and founded an engineering office in Munich. The Frankfurt electricity exhibition in 1891 and several power plants contributed to the reputation of Oskar von Miller. In the early years, the exhibition and the collection of the Deutsches Museum were strongly influenced personally by Oskar von Miller.

== History ==
A few months before the 1903 meeting of the Society of German Engineers, Oskar von Miller gathered a small group who supported his desire to found a science and technology museum. In a showing of support this group spontaneously donated 260,000 marks to the cause and elected a "Provisional Committee" to get the ball rolling.

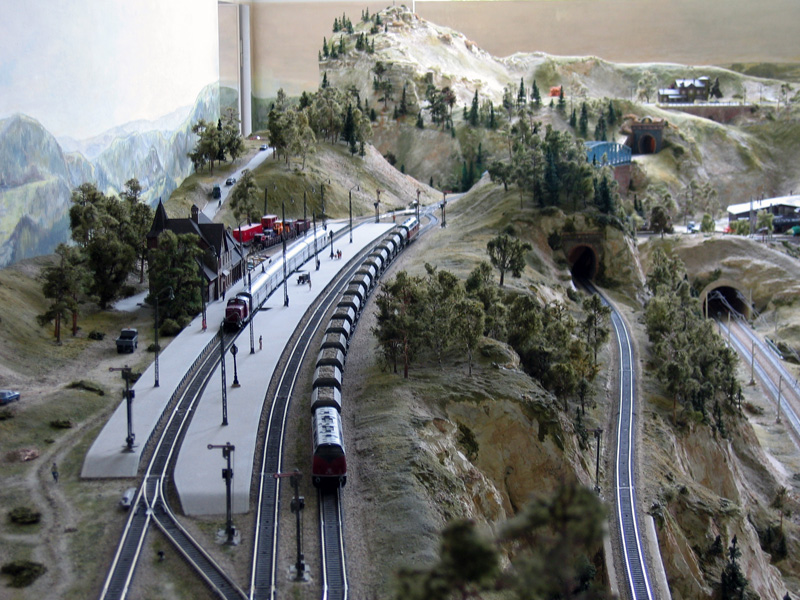
Model train set with many of Europe's rail types

In June 1903, Prince Ludwig agreed to act as patron of the museum and the city of Munich donated Coal Island as a site for the project. In addition, exhibits began to arrive from Munich, Germany, and abroad including collections from the Bavarian Academy. As no dedicated museum building existed, the exhibits were displayed in the National Museum.

On 12 November 1906, the temporary exhibits at the National Museum were ceremonially opened to the public and on November 13 the foundation stone was laid for the permanent museum.

The first name of the museum, the "German Museum for Masterpieces of Natural Science and Technology", was not meant to limit the museum to German advances in science and technology, but to express the importance of science and technology to the German people.

Oskar von Miller opened the new museum on his 70th birthday, 2 May 1925, after a delay of almost ten years. From the beginning, the museum displays are backed up by documents available in a public library and archives, which are open seven days a week to ensure access to the working public.

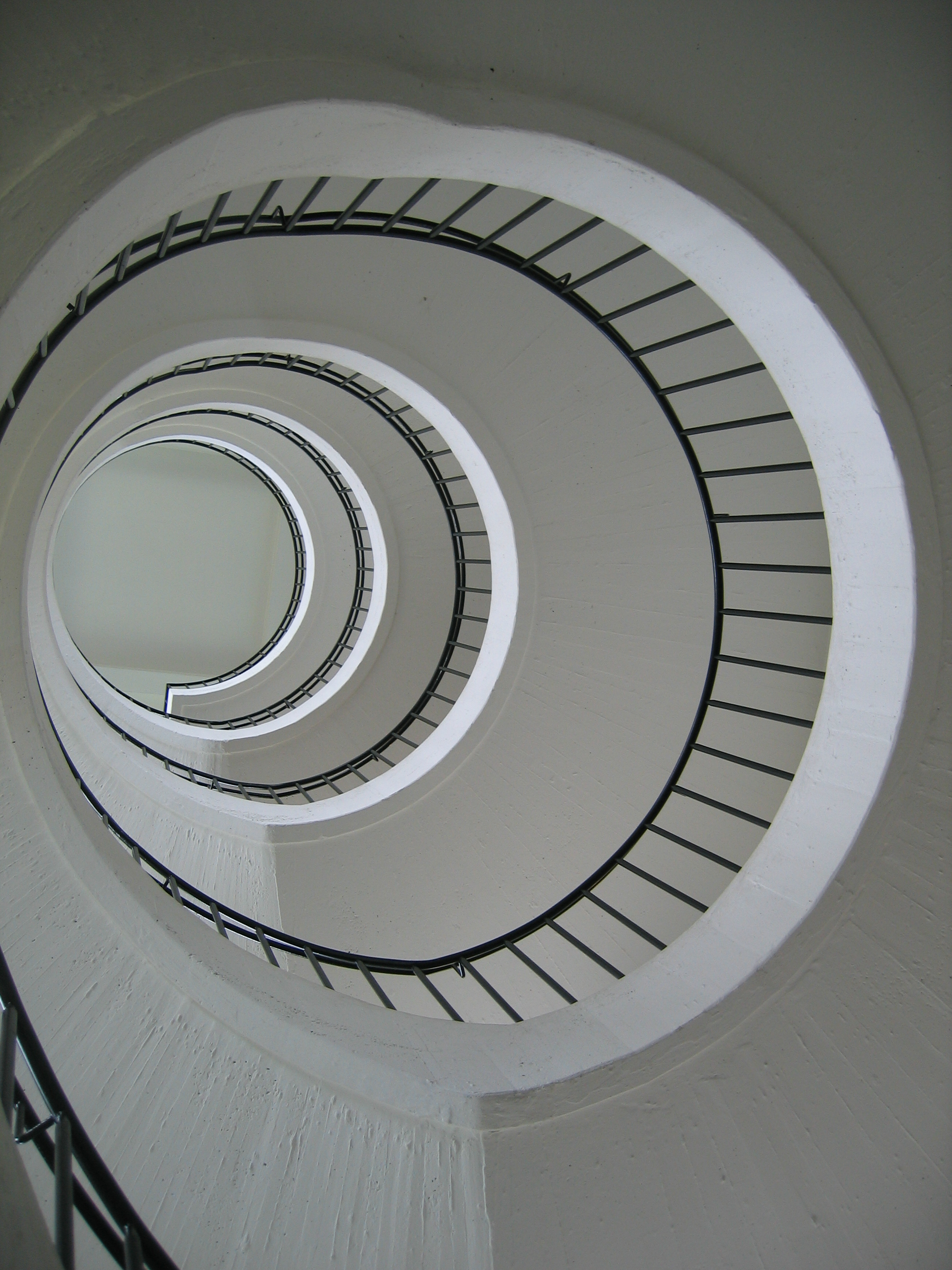
Clean white lines of the museum's winding staircase

Before and during World War II the museum was put on a shoestring budget by the Nazi party and many exhibits were allowed to get out of date with a few exceptions such as the new automobile room dedicated on 7 May 1937. By the end of 1944 the museum was badly damaged by air bombings with 80% of the buildings and 20% of the exhibits damaged or destroyed. As Allied troops marched into Munich in April 1945, museum director, Karl Bässler, barely managed to keep the last standing bridge to Museum Island from being blown up by retreating German troops.

Following the war the museum had to be closed for repairs and temporary tenants, such as the College of Technology and the Post Office used museum space as their own buildings were being reconstructed. The Museum was also home to the Central Committee of the Liberated Jews, representing Jewish displaced persons in the American Zone of Germany after the war, as well as to UNRRA that operated a camp for displaced persons and later an International University with over 2000 students.

In November 1945, the library was able to reopen, followed by the congress hall in January 1946. A special exhibit on fifty years of the Diesel engine opened in October 1947 and the regular exhibits began reopening in May 1948. Not until 1965, more than twenty years after the end of the war in Germany, did the exhibit area match (and then exceed) pre-war size.

During the 1950s, the museum focused on natural sciences rather than technology and many of the traditional large exhibits, such as civil engineering, were reduced in size to make way for more modern technological advances.

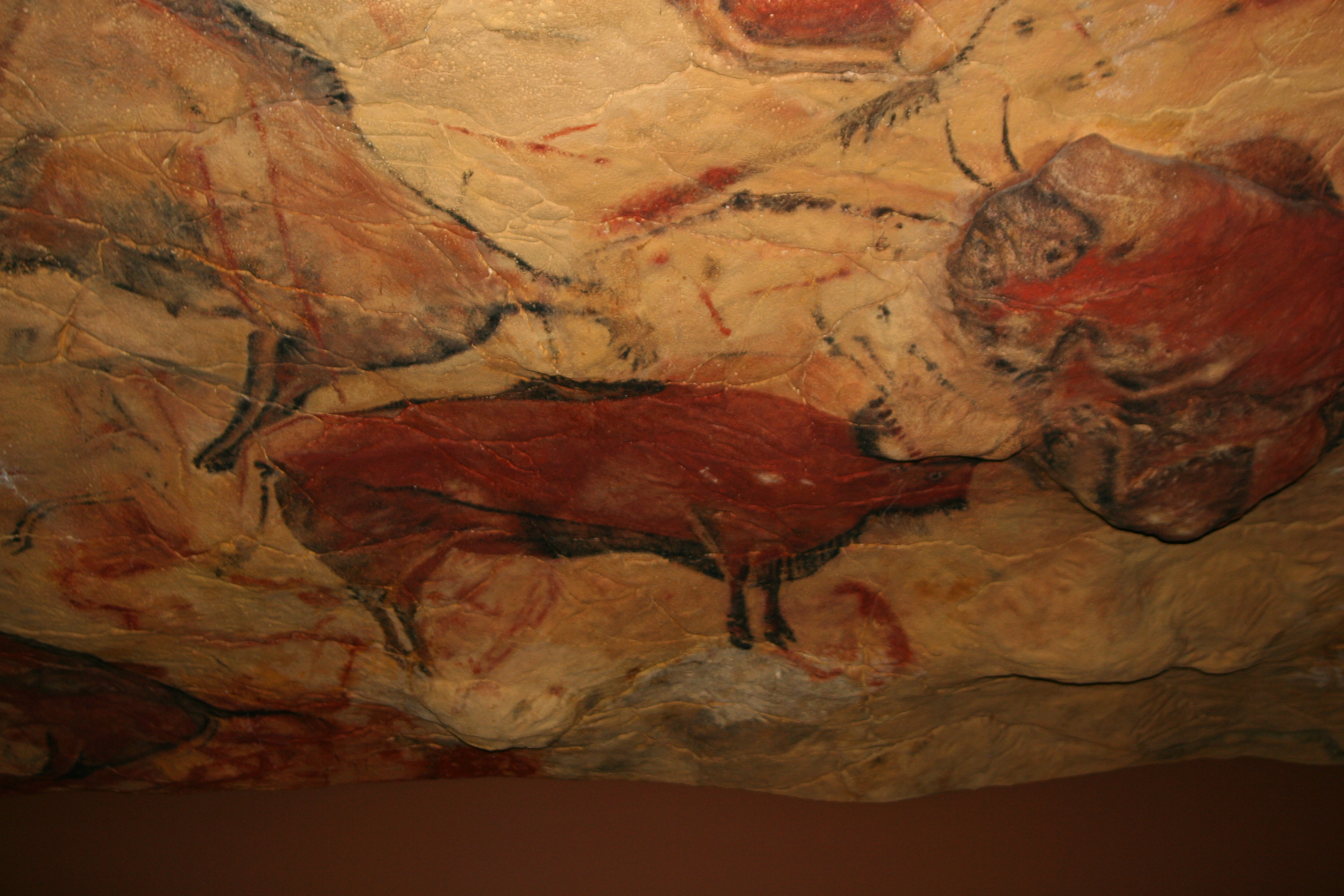
Reproduction of cave of Altamira in Deutsches Museum

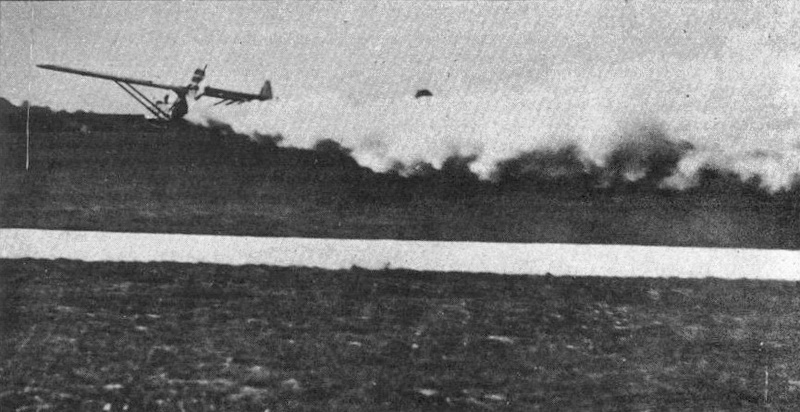
Opel RAK.1, world's first public flight of a rocket-powered aircraft on September 30, 1929

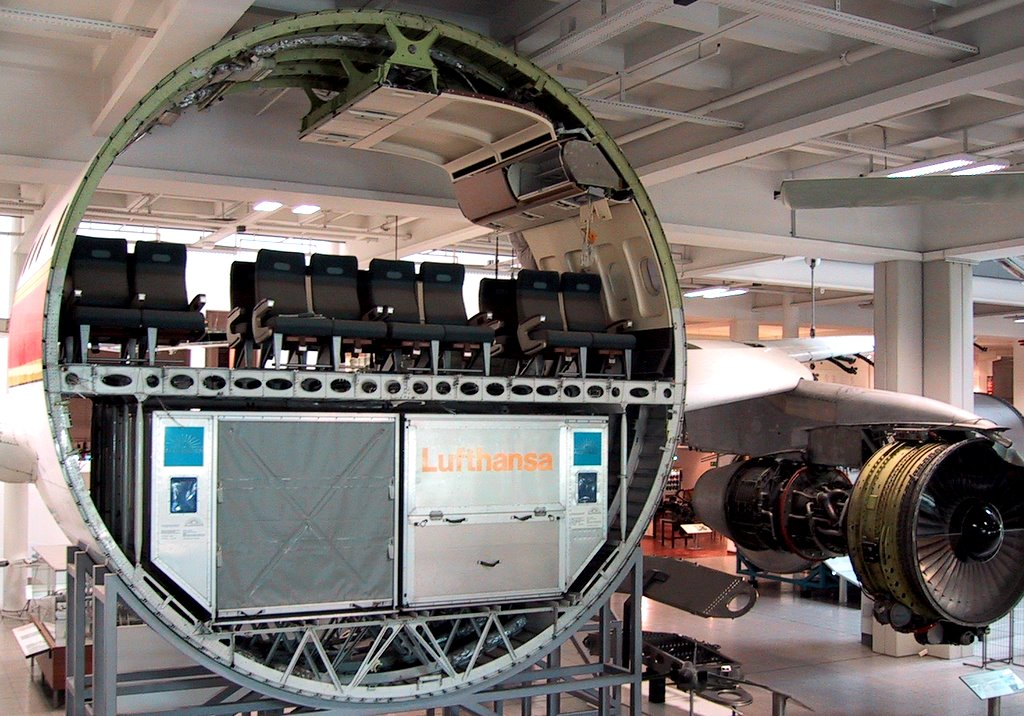
Parts of the first Airbus aircraft, the A300, is on display.

At a speech on the donation of a Opel RAK2 rocket-car replica to the Deutsches Museum, rocket pioneer Fritz von Opel summarized the history of rocketry ("Ein Pionier des Raketenantriebs berichtet", April 3, 1968) beginning with ancient rocket technologies over the world's first rocket program Opel RAK, initiated by Max Valier, Friedrich Wilhelm Sander and himself, to NASA's space missions of the 1960s. In August 1969, the Apollo 8 space capsule was shown in a special exhibit entitled "Man and Space" and in 1970 the first full-time director, Theo Stillger, was appointed. In the 1970s the mission statement of the museum was modified to encourage the explanation of the cultural significance of science and technology in exhibits.

The early 1980s saw severe damage to several exhibits due to arson resulting in the smallest exhibit space of 34,140 square meters (8½ acres). This was followed by an extensive reconstruction effort and additional building bringing the total exhibit space to 55,000 square meters (13½ acres) by 1993. The 1980s and '90s also brought agreements with the Science Centre in Bonn and the government resulting in the creation of Deutsches Museum Bonn and the Flugwerft Schleißheim airfield exhibit.

In 1996, the Bavarian Government gave buildings at the historic Theresienhöhe site in Munich to the Deutsches Museum resulting in the creation of the new transportation museum, the Deutsches Museum Verkehrszentrum, which opened in 2003 and now houses the road vehicle and train exhibits that were removed from the original Deutsches Museum site. The Theresienhöhe quarter is a new area on the edge of the inner city of Munich, and the Museum of Transport is a part of the quarter's design of mixed use.

=== Chronology ===
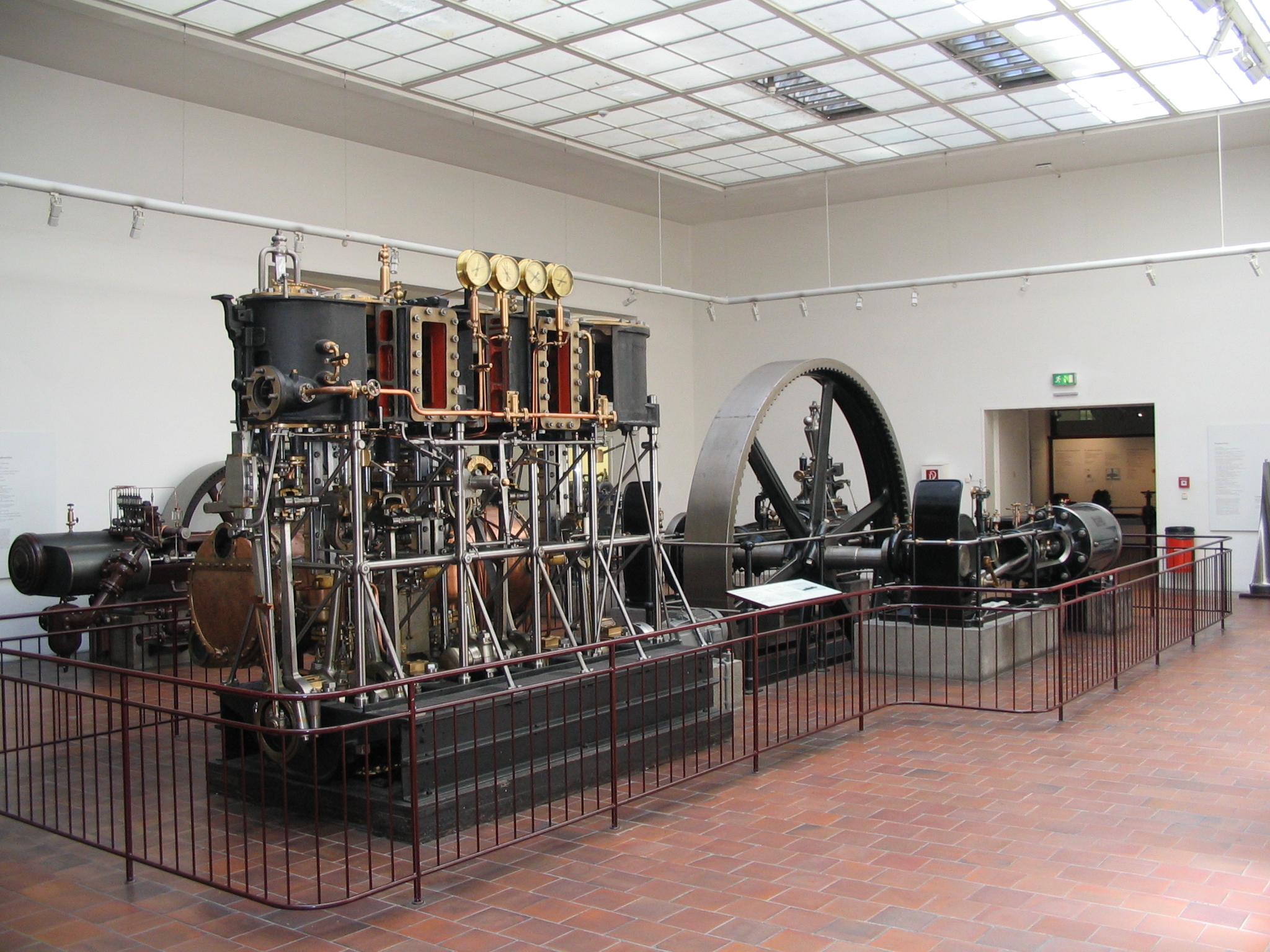
Historical steam engine exhibits

- 1903 Museum's foundation
- 1906 Opening the provisional collections in the rooms of the former National Museum in Maximilianstrasse
- 1909 Opening additional collections in the old barracks on the Isar (Ehrhardtstraße)
- 1911 Topping out ceremony of collection house
- 1925 Opening of the Deutsches Museum in the new building on Museum Island
- 1928 Laying the foundation stone for the library and hall
- 1930 Topping out ceremony of the library and hall
- 1932 Opening of the library
- 1935 Opening of the Congress Center
- 1944 Destruction of 80 percent of the building
- 1948 Reopening after the destruction
- 1983 Destruction of marine and engine sections by fire
- 1984 Opening of the new hall for Aerospace; temporary closure of some departments to hail and water damage
- 1992 Opening of the Schleißheim's Aviation Museum at the Oberschleißheim's airport
- 1995 Opening a branch of the Deutsches Museum in Bonn
- 2003 Opening of the Transportation Center on the former exhibition grounds
- 2006 Opening the Halls I and II of Transportation Center on the Theresienhöhe
- October 2015 start of the first major phase of renovation/modernization, with several exhibits closing
- September 2021 Opening of the branch Deutsches Museum Nuremberg - "Das Zukunftsmuseum"

== Current permanent exhibits ==
- Aerospace
- Agriculture
- Altamira Cave, reproduction of a Spanish cave with stone-age paintings
- Amateur Radio
- Astronautics
- Astronomy
- Bridge Building
- Ceramics
- Chemistry
- Chronometry
- Computers
- Digital Imaging
- Electrical Power
- Energy Technology
- Environment
- Geodesy
- Glass
- History of the Deutsches Museum
- Hydraulic Engineering
- Machine Components
- Machine Tools
- Marine Navigation
- Masterpieces
- Mining (Historical and Modern)
- Metallurgy
- Microelectronics
- Mineral Oil and Natural Gas
- Music
- Paper
- Pharmaceutics
- Physics
- Power Machinery
- Printing
- Scientific Instruments
- Technical Toys
- Telecommunications
- Textile Technology
- Tunnel Construction
- Weights and Measures

== See also ==
- Deutsches Museum Flugwerft Schleissheim (the D.M.'s offsite aviation museum)
- List of museums in Germany
- List of science museums
- MVG Museum
