= Julius Hatry =

German aircraft designer and builder

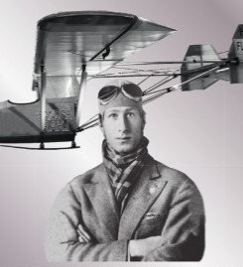
Julius Hatry, the designer of the world's first rocket plane Opel RAK.1

Julius Hatry (30 December 1906 – 7 November 2000) was a German aircraft designer and builder. He is remembered for his contributions to sailplane development in the early twentieth century and for building the world's first purpose-built rocket plane, the Opel RAK.1.

Hatry was born in Mannheim as son of Katharina and Julius Hatry senior, a successful Mannheim real estate entrepreneur. Julius Hatry junior developed an early interest in aviation, joining the Mannheim flying club in 1922. With the club, he became a frequent visitor to the annual gliding competitions held at the Wasserkuppe during the 1920s. Between 1927 and 1928, he assisted in the construction of the Kakadu (then the largest sailplane ever built) with the Munich Akaflieg (student flying) group. References from Alexander Lippisch and Oskar Ursinus helped him gain his first design contract, for a motor glider which never actually flew due to problems with its powerplant. His association with Lippisch also allowed him to participate in the 1928 rocketry experiments carried out for Fritz von Opel within Opel RAK, the world's first rocket program. This led to von Opel commissioning him to build him a rocket plane for a public demonstration the following year.

== Hatry and the world's first rocket program Opel RAK ==
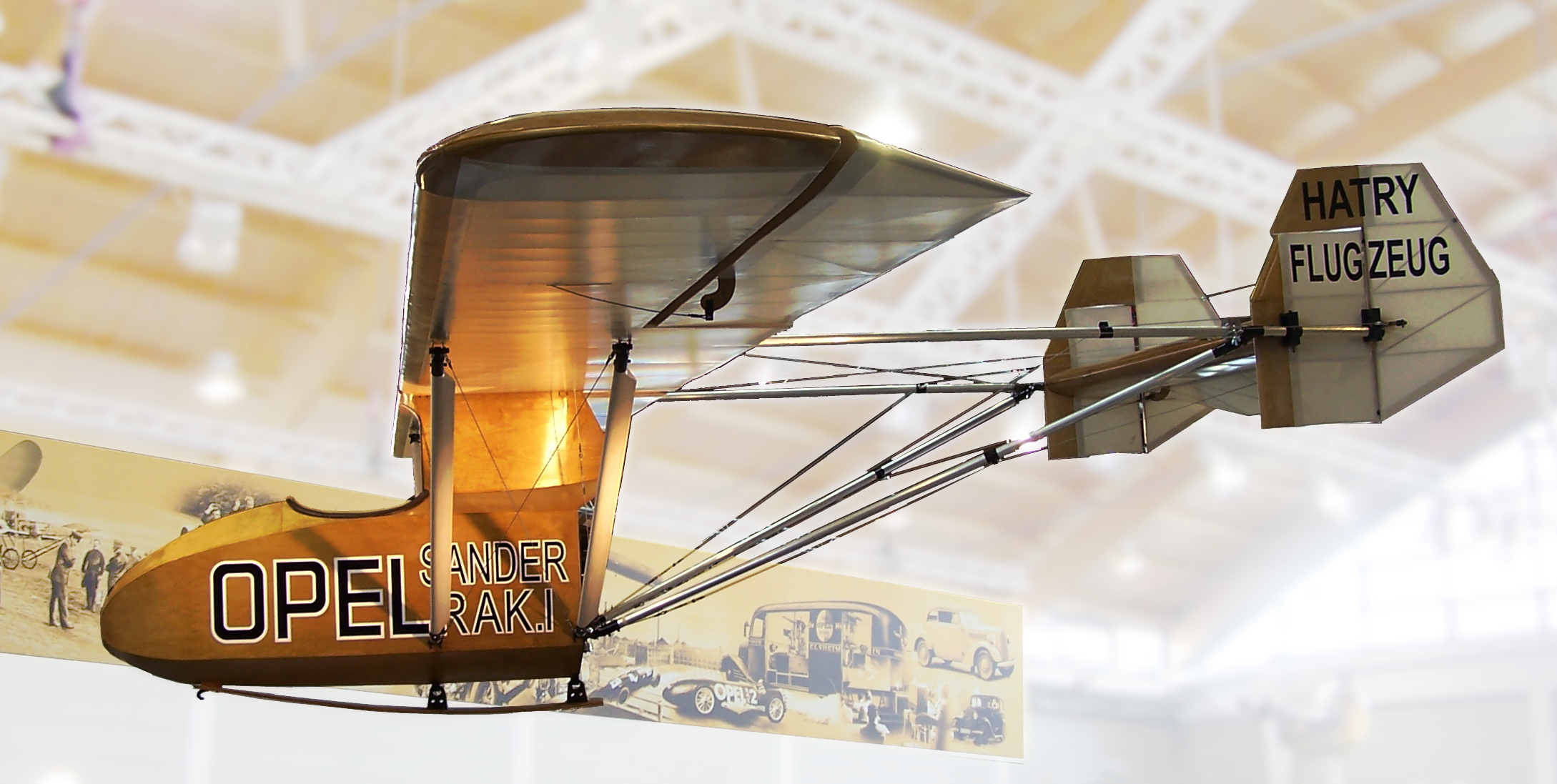
Replica of Opel RAK.1

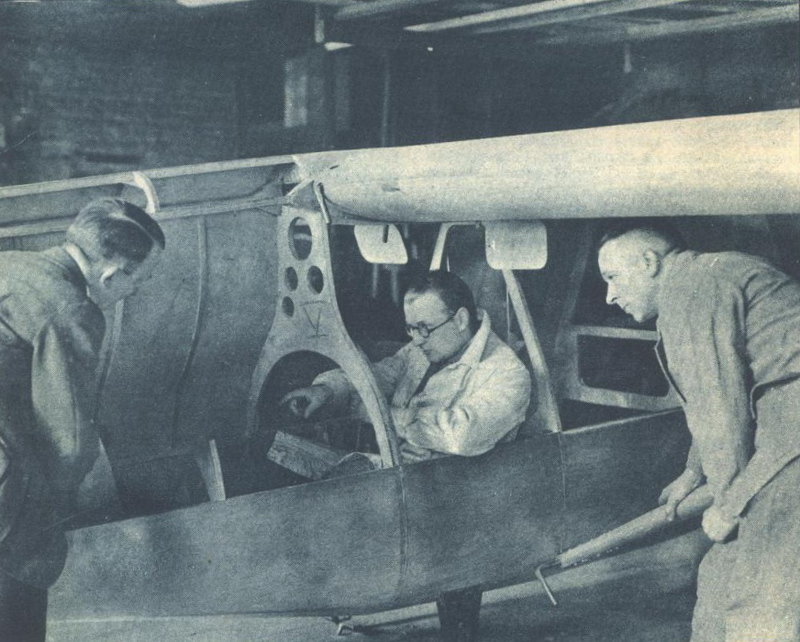
RAK liquid-fuel rocket aircraft prototype based on Gebrüder-Müller-Griessheim (GMG) design in construction, Fritz von Opel sitting in cockpit

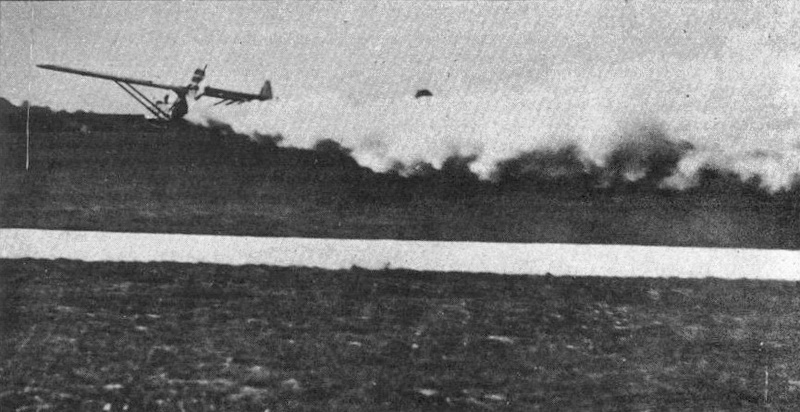
World's first public flight of a rocket-plane on September 30, 1929: Opel RAK.1, piloted by Fritz von Opel

As early as 1922, Julius Hatry, nicknamed "Uss", became a member of the Mannheim Aviation Club and through this came into contact with the first Rhön competitions. In 1927 he did the Abitur and passed the glider pilot C exam. His certificate with the number 409 was the first in the German state of Baden. He began studying engineering at the Technical University of Munich and worked as a flight instructor in Rossitten (East Prussia), where he also designed large aircraft models for the first time. In 1927/28, under August Kupper, Hatry was significantly involved in the construction of the Mü 3 "Kakadu", the largest glider at the time. In 1928 Hatry himself took part in a Rhön competition for the first time with the two-seater "Mannheim". He had met Alexander Lippisch and Oskar Ursinus in the aviation scene and was therefore commissioned to design a cell for a motor glider. However, the engine did not pass the type approval test. Then he developed the "Water Rat", a water glider with a boat-like fuselage and raised tail unit, with which he was awarded 1200 Reichsmark in the technical competition in the “Preisfliegen Rossitten 1928/1929”. In the meantime, Lippisch had carried out the first rocket model tests in 1928 on behalf of Fritz von Opel's Opel RAK program, using Friedrich Sander's rockets. Hatry evaluated the flight curves mathematically for months and was able to prove physical relationships between the thrust axis, center of gravity and the flight curves: The unsatisfactory results of the early experiments prompted Hatry to first analyze the problem theoretically and examine the flight behavior of a rocket plane more closely. While the space flight pioneers like Oberth and Goddard created their basic calculations for missile flights outside the earth's gravitational field, Hatry set up the basic equations of aircraft with rocket propulsion within the gravity range for the first time. This was Hatry's pioneering achievement in aeronautical science. His flight-mechanical calculations provided the requirements for the documents for the rocket aircraft model he built. Experiments with this model confirmed Hatry's calculations. This refuted Lippisch's wrong deduction about the causes of the unstable flight in his early Opel RAK experiments with Stamer as test pilot of the "Lippisch Ente". Lippisch found this so uncomfortable that he asked Hatry not to publish his calculations. Out of respect, Hatry followed Lippisch's request that this fundamental theoretical work would not be published in a specialist journal. As a scientific publication, it remained known only to a narrow circle of specialists and it was not until 1983 that Hatry published his equations, when they were already the subject of historical research.

After this preliminary work, Lippisch suggested the construction of new dedicated manned rocket aircraft. Hatry began construction in June 1929. Although initially working on his own, he later also entered the Opel RAK team, the industrialist Fritz von Opel provided the financial means for the construction of the RAK.1 within the OPEL RAK program framework.

Hatry was thrilled about the prospects of rocket flight. Immediately, in April 1929, he rented a workshop in Gersfeld (Rhön) and began to design and build his machine himself. He worked obsessively, faced with competition from the entire aviation industry. It was not a converted glider (as the "Lippisch Ente"), but a special design and construction according to the building regulations of the time for powered airplanes, which were much stricter than for gliders. The aircraft was intended exclusively for propulsion using solid-fuel rockets and for launch using a solid-rocket catapult, making it the first rocket aircraft in the world. It was at this time that Fritz von Opel found out about Hatry's work. Fritz von Opel, son of Wilhelm von Opel, was a co-owner of the car company and headed the advanced engineering and vehicle testing department and was also responsible for the Public Relations of the Opel company. Von Opel was already well-known as highly successful in any type of motors sports. Within Opel RAK, he and Max Valier, based on their successful rocket-powered land vehicles, wanted to build a rocket plane - leading to the Opel RAK experiments by Stamer and Lippisch at Wasserkuppe. Von Opel piloted himself the spectacular speed record drive of the RAK2 at the AVUS racetrack in Berlin, before a huge crowd and world media in 1928. The RAK2 car, as its predecessor the RAK1 rocket car, was built in Rüsselsheim on the company premises, equipped with rockets by Friedrich Sander (1885-1938).

Through the mediation of Sander and Lippisch, Opel was able to achieve a cooperation contract with Hatry: In the contract was stated that Hatry would do a test flight, and von Opel the first public flight. At the time of signing, the aircraft was still under construction, the hand-over was anticipated for end of July 1929. It was planned that after Opel's first public flight with the plane, Hatry would carry out rocket plane flights as a pilot at 42 places with which he had already concluded corresponding contracts. For this Hatry should receive at least 1000 Reichsmark per month and an additional 500 Reichsmark for each flight.

In accordance with the contract, the finished aircraft was delivered to Frankfurt at the beginning of September. In order to maintain secrecy, the tests were started with the aircraft, which was equipped with Sander's rockets, in a meadow near the “Mönchbruch” hunting estate near Frankfurt.

After a first successful test flight by von Opel in early September at "Jagdgut Mönchbruch" using a winch-launch procedure, on September 17, 1929, the prototype and the final launch catapult was ready and Hatry was able to travel about 500 meters at a height of 20 meters at a speed of 100 km / h, propelled by three solid fuel rockets that had 350 kilopond thrust and four seconds of burn time. Von Opel then invited the press to a public presentation in Frankfurt-Rebstock on September 30, during which he flew the RAK.1 himself. Von Opel was able to cover around three kilometers in 80 seconds on this flight. Even after that, Hatry continued to work on the construction of new types but was eventually sidelined by the Nazi government and military.

The RAK.2 did not get beyond a draft, however.

The Opel RAK program was discontinued due to the Great Depression. Von Opel left Germany before 1930 to the US, after the war to France and Switzerland. Fritz' sister Elinor von Opel had to flee Germany in a dramatic manner, hunted by SS troops, together with her two sons, the younger one was Gunter Sachs von Opel, to Switzerland in 1935, due to a bitter divorce battle and a public aversion to the Nazi leadership friends of her ex-husband. Max Valier, a member of the Opel RAK leadership, had after the Opel RAK breakup a fatal accident while testing liquid-fuel rocket motors in 1930. Friedrich Sander was engaged in German military projects under General Walter Dornberger but was imprisoned for treason by the Nazis and forced to sell his business. Sander died in custody 1938.

The collaboration between von Opel and Hatry was an alliance of convenience from the start and certainly not a "love marriage". A bitter rivalry erupted between them on who had the greater share in the plane construction: the technology designer or the financier and program head. Since the damage of RAK.1 while landing and due to the Great Depression also the 42 demonstration flights piloted by Hatry were canceled. The dispute could only be settled in 1934 and 1935 by an Opel payment of 10,000 Reichsmark in two tranches. Nevertheless, Hatry suffered lifelong trauma due to injustice, unfulfilled hopes and a very long concealment of his actual achievements.

Hatry returned devoting himself to studying the various problems of aerodynamics, gas dynamics, thermodynamics, ballistics and others that arise when designing rocket-powered aircraft. From April 1930 to spring 1933, Hatry earned his living as a construction examiner, 2nd class of the German Aviation Association: He carried out the construction test of gliders in the area responsible for him in North Baden / Palatinate.

== Third Reich period ==
With the "Machtübernahme" or "takeover of power" by the Nazi Party in 1933, Hatry had increasing difficulties because he had a Jewish grandfather: Hatry had to leave his job as a construction inspector. He was, in his words, "kicked out of the Badisch-Palatinate Aviation Association in Mannheim by the then SS-Fliegersturmführer ...". So Hatry went back to Berlin, where he hoped for the support of Ernst Udet, now in the Aviation Ministry. He still believed that he could be useful as a rocket aircraft engineer. This area was not under Udet, but under Walter Dornberger (1895–1980) in the Heereswaffenamt. Dornberger showed a lot of interest and ordered a comprehensive elaboration from Hatry on all conceivable possible uses of missiles, including as a weapon. A year of intensive research followed, including, among other things, the processing of experiments by the "AG for Industrial Gas Utilization Heylandt" with liquid-fuel rockets, that were accessible to him thanks to the help of Professor Wilhelm Hoff (1883–1945), head of the Aviation Research Institute. This is how Hatry wrote his report, which "assumed the scope and content of a doctoral thesis". When he handed over his work to Dornberger, he was asked for his personal papers. "I never heard from the Army Office again!". Hatry later suspected that this work was used in Peenemünde. With it, his engineering activity came to an abrupt end, and Hatry was excluded from the great opportunities for further development in his field. Hatry himself wrote later at great age, not without bitterness: "In this way, on the one hand, I was spared the typical research fate that a purposeless search for expansion of human knowledge and possibilities is steered through time events in a direction that was never inherent in the original intentions. On the other hand, however, a job that had begun promisingly at a very young age certainly could not find its crowning glory."

== Life after end of rocket plane design career ==
In 1935, Hatry married the actress, Annemarie Schradiek. In the same year, he had to stop his research at the instigation of the National Socialists because he had a Jewish grandfather. So, he now turned completely to film. Arnold Fanck had already hired him in 1925. First as an actor because he was a very good skier, then as a cameraman. Hatry made films with Hannes Schneider, Luis Trenker, Leni Riefenstahl and Ernst Udet in the 20s. Udet also stood up for him during the Nazi era. As a screenwriter and assistant director, he made entertainment films for the Tobis company in Berlin, in which Theo Lingen, Leni Marenbach and Rudolf Prack contributed, among others. From 1943 to 45, he was production manager and director for the Mars film company and made educational films for the Air Force. Also, during his second career in the movie business, Hatry faced many setbacks and discriminations due to his Jewish origins, especially after Udet's death who had tried to protect and shield Hatry. "Highly satisfying job and widely recognized. But: after Udets death, termination without notice on December 31, 1941", Hatry noted. Nevertheless, he could sign a temporary contract with "Tobis Filmkunst GmbH": he was assistant director for the films Die große Nummer and Die Wirtin zum Weißen Rössl, and co-director of the film Die tolle Nacht.

In February 1945, Hatry experienced the infamous air raids on the city in Dresden, which he later described in detail. Despite all the horror of the events he portrayed, Hatry closed his description denouncing Hitler and Nazi Germany as root cause of the disaster. After the end of the war, Hatry was able to return to his family in Hamburg.

Even after the World War, Julius Hatry remained versatile. He made documentaries. Commissioned by Alfred Döblin, he dramatized "Der Oberst und der Dichter" and acted as director at the Baden-Baden Theater. He translated the writers Anouilh, Bridie and Vercors. He dubbed French films and even represented Germany with his own movie "Reitanleitung für eine Geliebte" at the 1950 Venice Biennale.

After the father's death in 1950 and the bankruptcy of his movie business in 1953, Hatry's mother had finally persuaded him to take over the father's real-estate business. In 1952, Hatry and his family left Hamburg for good to continue running and expanding the "Julius Hatry" company in Mannheim. Here too, Hatry worked with full devotion. He was particularly active in the reconstruction of Mannheim's most important shopping street (Planken) and its passages. He not only worked as an entrepreneur, but also as an architect. With his conceptions, he contributed to several house blocks in squares O7 and P7, especially house P7, 1 for his own company, as well as to Viktoriahaus, OVA- and Kurpfalzpassage. Hatry also worked as an interior designer, especially for offices and facilities for medical doctors.

Nationwide, Hatry procured suitable retail locations for large chain stores such as "Quelle", "Tengelmann", and others all over Germany. Hatry became a member of the "Ring Deutscher Makler" association and enjoyed high reputation among experts. He ran his company until 1991.

In 1982, Hatry returned to aviation when he joined the German Aerospace Society (DGLR) despite being aged around 75 years. In 1985, he took over the position of coordinator for the short biographies of the Pioneers series and a year later he was involved in the re-establishment of the district group North Baden-Palatinate, which he headed until his death. Hatry died of heart failure in a Mannheim hospital.

== Awards ==
The DGLR awarded Hatry the status of a "Corresponding Member" (Honorary Fellow) at the German Aerospace Congress 1992 "in recognition of his pioneering designs and experiments for rocket propulsion for aircraft".

Hatry was awarded the Ziolkowsky Medal of Honor in Kaluga, Russia. The city of Mannheim named a street in the Glückstein Quarter after him and on November 22, 2016, decided on the honorary status for his grave in the main cemetery. A replica of the RAK.1 can be viewed in the Technoseum in Mannheim, the construction of which Hatry himself supervised.
