= Friedrich Wilhelm Sander =

German rocket engineer (1885-1938)

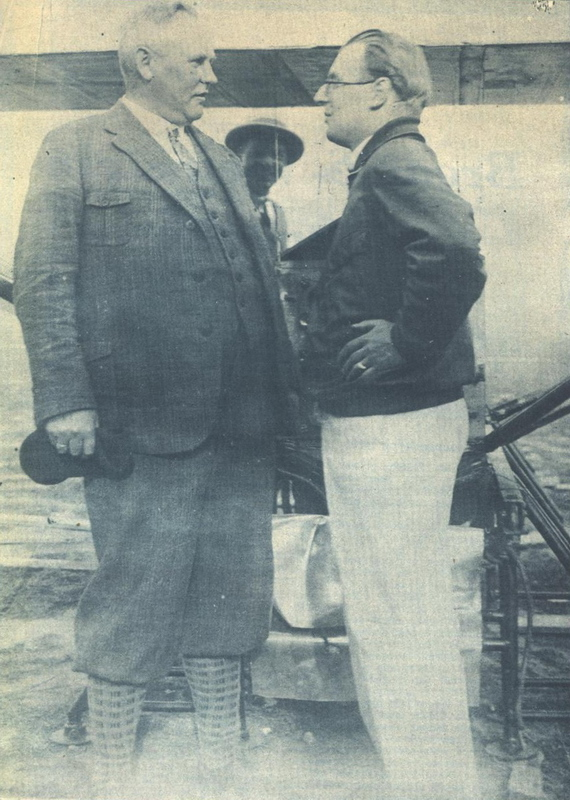
Friedrich Sander (left) and Fritz von Opel (right) in front of Opel RAK 1 rocket-powered aircraft. Rebstock, Frankfurt. 30 September 1929

Friedrich Wilhelm Sander (25 August 1885 in Glatz (Kłodzko) – 15 September 1938) was a German pyrotechnics and rocket technology engineer as well as manufacturer remembered for his contributions to rocket-powered flight as key protagonist of the Opel-RAK program.

Sander was the son of a professional soldier. He went to school in Uslar on the southwestern edge of the Solling and then learned to be a mechanical engineer. At the Technikum Strelitz in Altstrelitz in Mecklenburg he became an engineer around 1908/09. In 1909 Sander moved to Bremerhaven. Here he worked in various areas. In 1920 he took over the company of master gunsmith H. G. Cordes in Bremerhaven, who had existed from 1853 and was known as the inventor of the whaling cannon. Sander soon expanded the factory's products to include signal rockets.

From 1925, the Sander line-throwing rocket pistols designed by him for the rescue of shipwrecked people belonged to the equipment of the rescue stations and boats of the German Society for the Rescue of Shipwrecked People and many similar organizations around the world. In 1925, Sander bought the Schultz ship telegraph factory in Bremerhaven, which gave him a larger, two-story factory building at Fährstrasse No. 26 as a prerequisite for accepting development contracts offered by the Navy.

In 1928, he was approached by Max Valier, on behalf of Fritz von Opel to provide rockets to propel cars and aircraft as a means of popularizing the use of rockets for propulsion and for promoting the Opel company. Their joint projects within Opel-RAK, the world's first large-scale rocket program, involved the creation of the world's first rocket car, the Opel RAK.1 and the first rocket glider, the Ente, and the world's first purpose-built rocket plane Opel RAK.1.

He was married to Cäcilie Sander and had three boys: Hans HW (1918-1998), Bruno (1918-1983) and Herbert (1920-?).

== Opel RAK rocket program ==
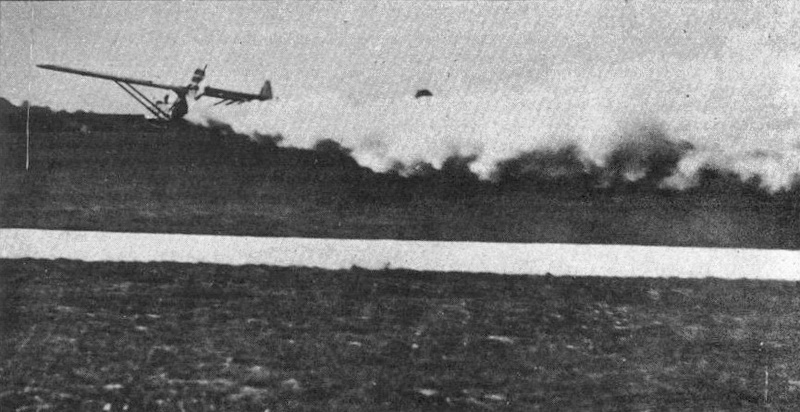
Opel RAK.1 - world's first public flight of a rocket plane on 30 September 1929 at Frankfurt-Rebstock

Fritz von Opel and Sander were instrumental in popularizing rockets as means of propulsion for vehicles. In the 1920s, they initiated together with Max Valier, co-founder of the "Verein für Raumschiffahrt", the world's first rocket program, Opel-RAK, leading to speed records for automobiles, rail vehicles and the first public manned rocket-powered flight in September 1929. Months earlier in 1928, one of his rocket-powered prototypes, the Opel RAK2, reached piloted by von Opel himself at the AVUS speedway in Berlin a record speed of 238 km/h, watched by 3000 spectators and world media, among them Fritz Lang, director of Metropolis and Woman in the Moon, world boxing champion Max Schmeling and many more sports and show business celebrities. A world record for rail vehicles was reached with RAK3 and a top speed of 256 km/h. After these successes, von Opel piloted the world's first public rocket-powered flight using Opel RAK.1, a rocket plane designed by Julius Hatry.

Timeline

- On 15 March 1928, Opel tested his first rocket-powered car, the Opel RAK.1, and achieved a top speed of 75 km/h (47 mph) in it, proving the feasibility of the concept of rocket propulsion. Less than two months later, he reached a speed of 230 km/h (143 mph) in the RAK.2, driven by 24 solid-fuel rockets.
- Later that same year, he purchased a sailplane named the "Lippisch Ente" (Ente is "duck" in German) from Alexander Lippisch and attached rocket motors to it, creating the world's first rocket plane on 11 June. The aircraft exploded on its second test flight, before Opel had had a chance to pilot it himself, so he commissioned a new aircraft, also called the RAK.1, from Julius Hatry, and flew it at Frankfurt-am-Main on 30 September 1929. In the meantime, another mishap had claimed the RAK.3, a rocket-powered railway car powered by 30 solid-fuel rockets which had reached a speed of 254 km/h (157 mph).
- Also in 1928, Opel built and test ran a rocket-powered motorcycle called the Monster.

== Liquid-fuel rocket development, test launches and a planned flight across the English channel ==
According to Frank H. Winter, curator at National Air and Space Museum in Washington, DC, the Opel group was also working on liquid-fuel rockets (SPACEFLIGHT, Vol. 21,2, Feb. 1979): In a cabled exclusive to The New York Times on 30 September 1929, von Opel is quoted as saying: "Sander and I now want to transfer the liquid rocket from the laboratory to practical use. With the liquid rocket I hope to be the first man to thus fly across the English Channel. I will not rest until I have accomplished that." At a speech on the donation of a RAK 2 replica to the Deutsches Museum, von Opel mentioned also Opel engineer Josef Schaberger as a key collaborator. "He belonged," von Opel said, "with the same enthusiasm as Sander to our small secret group, one of the tasks of which was to hide all the preparations from my father, because his paternal apprehensions led him to believe that I was cut out for something better than being a rocket researchist. Schaberger supervised all the details involved in construction and assembly (of rocket cars), and every time I sat behind the wheel with a few hundred pounds of explosives in my rear, and made the first contact, I did so with a feeling of total security [...] As early as 1928, Mr. Schaberger and I developed a liquid rocket, which was definitely the first permanently operating rocket in which the explosive was injected into the combustion chamber and simultaneously cooled using pumps. [...] We used benzol as the fuel," von Opel continued, "and nitrogen tetroxide as the oxidizer. This rocket was installed in a Mueller-Griessheim aircraft and developed a thrust of 70 kg (154 lb.)." By May 1929, the engine produced a thrust of 200 kg (440 lb.) "for longer than fifteen minutes and in July 1929, the Opel RAK collaborators were able to attain powered phases of more than thirty minutes for thrusts of 300 kg (660-lb.) at Opel's works in Rüsselsheim," according to Max Valier's account.

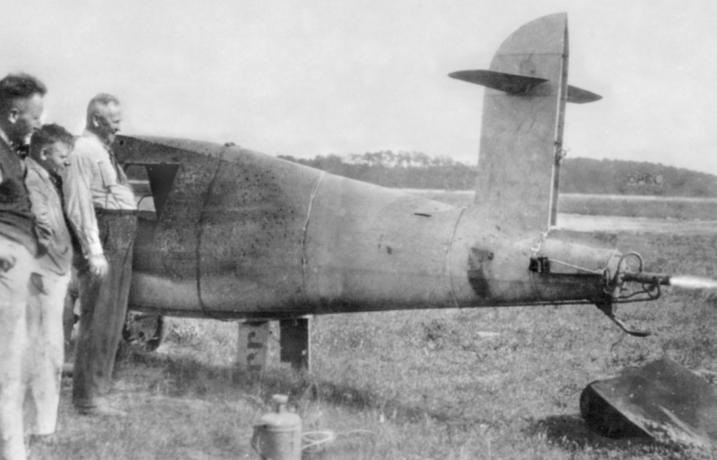
Friedrich Sander, Opel RAK technician August Becker and Opel employee Karl Treber (from right to left) in front of liquid-fuel rocket-plane prototype while test operation at Opel Rennbahn in Rüsselsheim

Max Valier also reports the launch of two experimental liquid-fuel rockets by Sander on 10 and 12 April 1929. In his book “Raketenfahrt” he describes the size of the rockets as of 21 cm in diameter and with a length of 74 cm, weighing 7 kg empty and 16 kg with fuel. The maximum thrust was 45 to 50 kp, with a total burning time of 132 seconds. These properties indicate a gas pressure pumping. The first missile rose so quickly that Sander lost sight of it. Two days later, a second unit was ready to go, Sander tied a 4,000-meter-long rope to the rocket. After 2000 m of rope had been unwound, the line broke and this rocket also disappeared in the area, probably near the Opel proving ground and racetrack in Rüsselsheim, the "Rennbahn". The main purpose of these tests was to develop the propulsion system for the aircraft for crossing the English channel. Therefore, the flights of these two (compared to the airplane) small rockets were not published. The combustion tests with the aircraft rocket engine proceeded very successful. Unfortunately the plane was destroyed during a nightly transport on a truck on the Opel factory grounds, as the senior boss Wilhelm von Opel felt disturbed by the engine noise and wanted to stop this new “dangerous madness” of his son.

== Imprisonment in Third Reich period ==
From 1930, Sander (with other pyrotechnics factories) began secretly manufacturing rockets for military purposes, at the direction of Walter Dornberger. Without warning, Sander was arrested by the Gestapo on 31 January 1935. His company was subordinated to a trustee of the military, so it was expropriated and all documents were confiscated. After three months in custody, Sander was released, only to be arrested again in November 1935. After a year in custody, he was sentenced to four and a half years in prison and a fine for treason. Sander had also sold his missiles to Italy and England. Since these were older versions of his powder rockets, he did not consider this to be forbidden. Sander speculated that the Army Weapons Office ("Heereswaffenamt") wanted to develop and manufacture the missile weapons itself. His company was run as Donar GmbH für Apparatebau without him. He died in 1938.
