= Opel RAK.1 =

German experimental rocket car

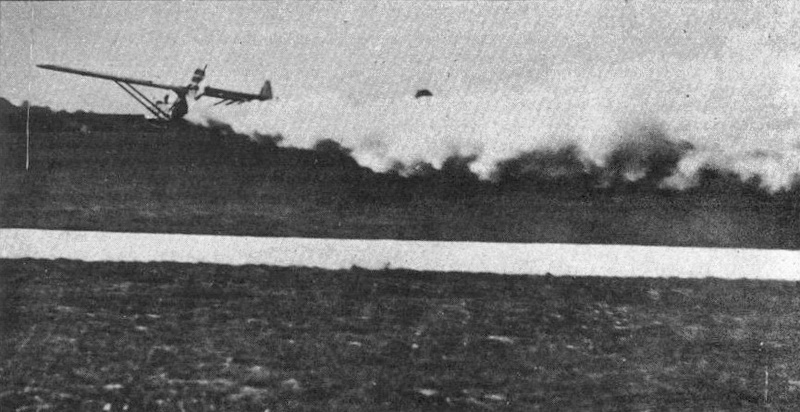
Opel RAK.1, world's first public flight of a rocket-powered aircraft on September 30, 1929

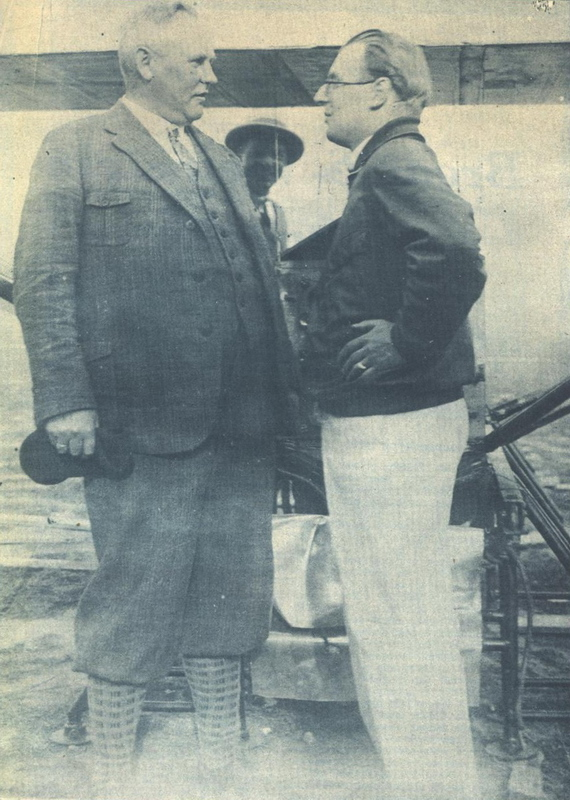
Fritz von Opel (right) and Friedrich Sander (left) in front of Opel RAK.1

The Opel RAK.1 (also known as the Opel RAK.3) was the world's first purpose-built rocket-powered aircraft. It was designed and built by Julius Hatry under commission from Fritz von Opel, who flew it on September 30, 1929 in front of a large crowd at Rebstock airport near Frankfurt am Main. The RAK.1 plane was part of a series of rocket-powered vehicles that were developed and demonstrated within the Opel RAK program, the world's first large-scale rocket program.

The idea to build and race a rocket-powered car as an intermediate step to realize rocket-powered aviation and even spaceflight was suggested to von Opel by Max Valier. After World War I, Valier became highly interested in rocketry. Valier, in 1927, he was one of the co-founders of the German Verein für Raumschiffahrt, or "Spaceflight Society", a group of later highly influential scientists who would play a major role in making rocket spaceflight a reality. As an early spaceflight advocate, Valier was more interested in publicizing rocketry than marketing Opel automobiles but came to the conclusion that building a successful rocket-powered car would achieve both goals. Von Opel confirmed his interest in realizing Valier's proposal. On behalf of von Opel, Valier eventually contacted Friedrich Wilhelm Sander, a German pyrotechnical engineer who, in 1923, had purchased H.G. Cordes, a Bremerhaven firm famous for its manufacture of black-powder rockets used mainly for harpoons, signal devices and similar devices. Opel, Sander and Valier joined forces and combined into one entity the financing, the theoretical knowledge, and the practical capability necessary for success. Moreover, von Opel, Valier, and Sander said from the start that their experiments with cars were only a prelude to grander experiments with air- and spacecraft: They agreed on the final goal for Opel RAK of working on rocket-powered aircraft at the same time they were building their famous rocket cars, as pre-condition for the anticipated spaceflight application.

== Preparatory work on rocket-powered land vehicles ==
The group went to an Opel race car, “RAK 1.” The RAK 1 demonstrator was stripped of its engine and radiator to reduce weight. To help keep the car’s wheels on the ground at expected high speeds, the group attached behind each front wheel a small, wing-like stub, set at a negative angle of attack. For propulsion, they elected to use 12 black-powder rockets, mounted in four rows of three rockets each and ignited electrically. The propellant, similar to gunpowder, burned in a subsonic deflagration wave and not in a supersonic detonation wave. A demonstration for the press on April 11, 1928, in Rüsselsheim was arranged: Opel engineer and race driver Kurt C. Volkhart developed and tested the Opel-RAK 1, a converted racing car equipped with Sander rockets instead of an internal combustion engine, which was the first rocket powered automobile. During the April 1928 experiments, piloted by Volkhart, RAK 1 reached the symbolic speed of 100 km/h in just eight seconds.

Von Opel, Sander and Valier were satisfied by RAK 1’s performance, and in particular by the attracted positive publicity for the science of rocketry, but also the Opel company. Nevertheless it was clear to the RAK program leadership, they had no plans to commercially produce rocket cars for end customers, the aim was the development and demonstration of a rocket-powered aircraft. The group continued their land projects and built RAK 2, designed by Volkhart from the ground up as a rocket car. It was far larger and more streamlined than its predecessor. The RAK 2 was powered by 24 rockets packing 264 pounds of explosives. On May 23, 1928, Fritz von Opel himself demonstrated the car, Opel RAK 2, on the Avus Speedway near Berlin. Prior to the start Professor Johann Schütte, Chairman of the Scientific Society of Aviation, and Fritz von Opel held prophetic speeches on the future of rocket-based aviation and spaceflight. After these introductory remarks, mechanics August Becker and Karl Treber then took the tarpaulin off the Opel RAK 2 and carefully pushed it to the start. Eventually the rockets were installed and connected to the ignition mechanism. Police cleared the AVUS track and von Opel drove the RAK 2 car to a record-setting speed of 238 km/h, successfully mastering the challenge of insufficient downforce from the wings for these velocities. The RAK 2 rockets were operational for a ride of circa three minutes, watched by 3,000 spectators and world media, among them Fritz Lang, director of Metropolis and Woman in the Moon, world boxing champion Max Schmeling and many more sports and show business celebrities:

A world record for rail vehicles was reached with RAK3 on June 23, 1928, with the car attaining a top speed of 256 km/h over a 5-km stretch of straight track near Hanover. Some 20,000 spectators watched RAK 3 breaking the existing world speed record of railcars by nearly 40 km/h. The resulting international publicity after RAK2 and RAK3 demonstrations was enormous and gave the science of rocketry a major boost. A replica of the RAK 2 rocket-propelled car is on display at the Opel museum in Rüsselsheim, another one at the "Deutsches Museum" in Munich.

== Pioneering phase at Wasserkuppe Mountain ==
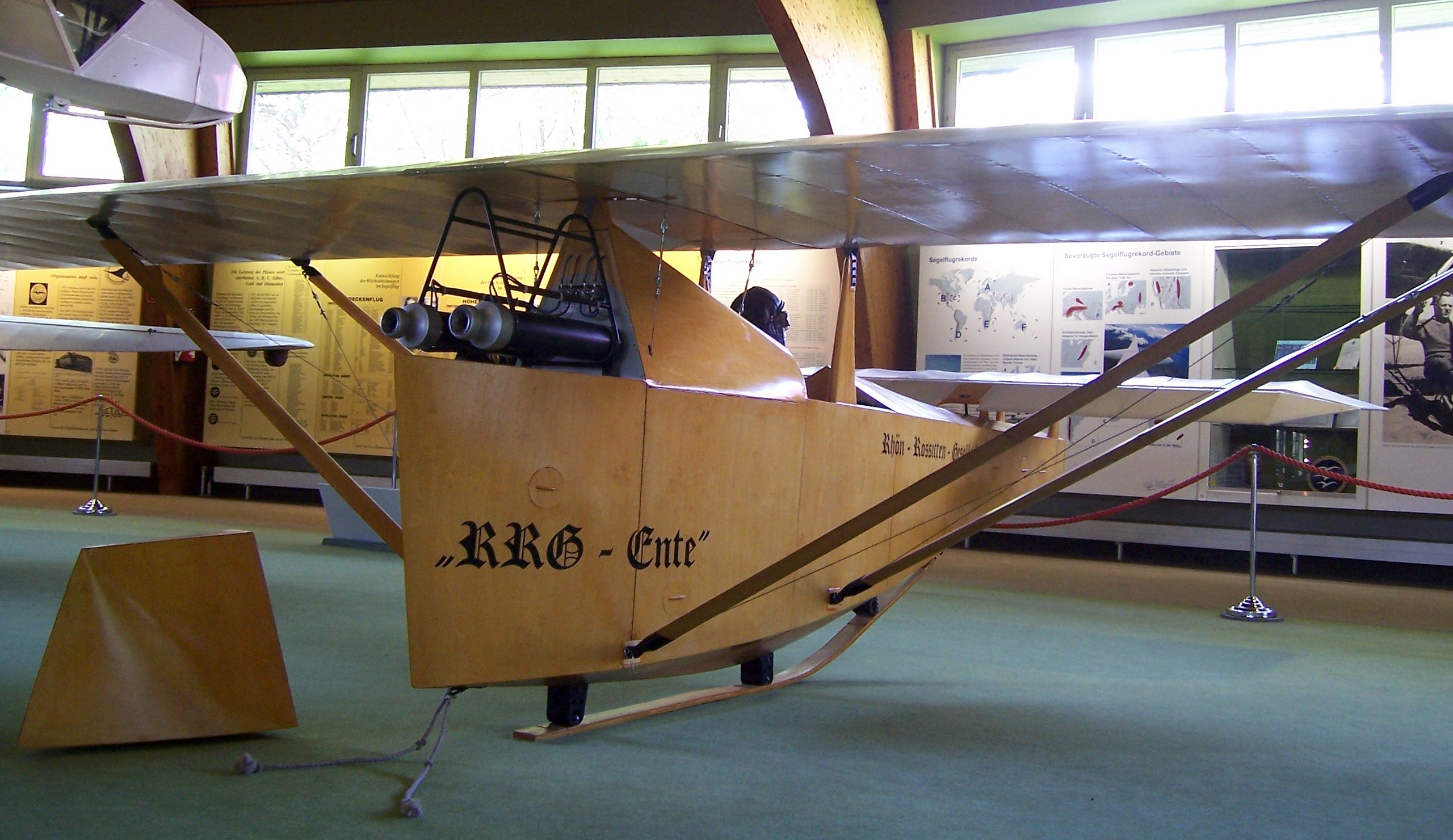
Replica of "Raketen-Ente", an Alexander Lippisch designed sailplane, bought by Opel and equipped with two of Friedrich Sander's Opel RAK rockets; on display in Deutsches Segelflugmuseum at Wasserkuppe

After testing at Wasserkuppe, in June 1928, Fritz von Opel had purchased an Alexander Lippisch-designed sailplane, the Ente, and fitted it with rockets. Fritz Stamer was the pilot during the OPEL RAK experimentations with Lippisch's design. Opel did not get the chance to fly it, however, as the aircraft was destroyed by an engine explosion on its second test flight. With a wingspan of just under 12 metres (40 ft), and a length of some 4.3 metres (14 ft), the Ente featured a canoe-like fuselage, canard surfaces, and rudders mounted outboard on a straight rectangular wing. Each of the aircraft’s two 200-newton-thrust (44 lbf) rocket engines were tightly packed with about 4 kilograms (8 lb) of black powder. Designed to fire in sequence, the rockets were ignited electrically by the pilot. An automatic counterweight system was set to adjust the aircraft’s center of gravity as the rocket fuel was consumed. An elastic launching rope was used to catapult the Ente into the air. After one false start, the aircraft took off and flew a 1,500 metre (4,900 ft) circuit of the Wasserkuppe's landing strip. On the second flight, the team decided to try firing both rockets together for increased thrust over a shorter period. Something went wrong, however, and rather than burning properly, one of the rockets exploded, punching holes in both wings and setting the aircraft afire. Stamer was nevertheless able to bring it down from a height of around 20 metres (65 ft) before hastily abandoning the Ente, which was burned beyond any hope of salvage.

== Opel RAK.1 as the world's first dedicated rocket plane ==
Despite the loss of the first rocket plane, von Opel immediately contracted with Julius Hatry for a specialized rocket aircraft. Hatry’s design for Opel was rather more elegant than the Ente. With a wingspan of 36 feet and length of 16 feet, the new aircraft Opel RAK.1 had a typical sailplane wing, under which a pod was suspended to accommodate the pilot and sixteen of Sander's solid rocket engines each with 50 pounds of thrust. The tailplane was mounted on booms behind the wing and high out of the way of the rocket exhaust. The aircraft is sometimes referred to as the Opel-Hatry RAK.1 or Opel-Sander RAK.1 in acknowledgment of its builder or the supplier of its engines respectively. In still other references it is called the RAK.3 to distinguish it from Opel's previous RAK.1 and RAK.2 rocket cars. As it happened, all three names, Opel, Sander, and Hatry were painted on the aircraft (with Opel’s most prominent), as was the RAK.1 designation.

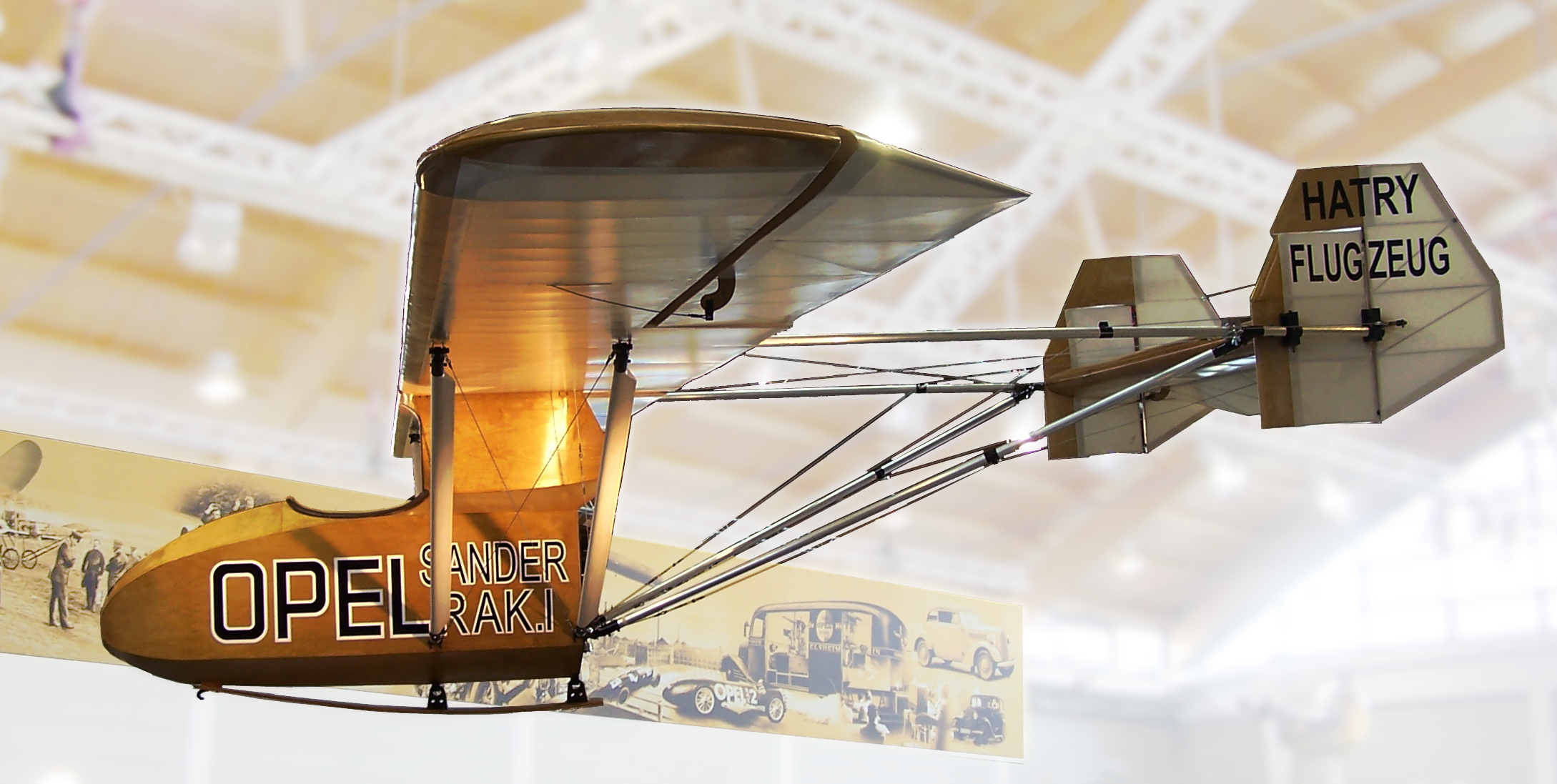
Replica of Opel RAK.1, the world's first purpose-built rocket plane

The first public flight came on Sept. 30, 1929. Before a large crowd assembled outside of Frankfurt, the intrepid von Opel made a successful flight of almost 3.5 km in 75 seconds, reaching an estimated top speed of around 150 km/h. RAK.1 made a hard landing, but it had made an emphatic point about rocket aviation and immensely popularized rockets as means of propulsion, causing a so called global "rocket rumble". The Mannheim Museum of Technology, Technoseum, has a replica of RAK.1 as the world's first dedicated rocket-plane on display, the execution of which Julius Hatry himself supervised. Technoseum also hosts original parts of the RAK.1 and Hatry's estate.

According to Frank H. Winter in SPACEFLIGHT magazine, the initial plan was a course from Frankfurt to Rüsselsheim, site of the Opel Automobile Works and about 16 km due southwest. At the last minute, however, the Government intervened in the name of safety: There was fear that he might crash into a village or railroad station. He was thus obliged to confine the flight to the immediate environs of the Rebstock Airport, set in an otherwise uninhabited forest glade. As for the press and public, von Opel this time sincerely wished to keep them within limits, "to avoid any possible trouble with the unruly crowds." According to Winter, von Opel had invited a few newspaper media and granted exclusive American rights to The New York Times and Fox Movietone for filming. Nevertheless, Universal Newsreel of the US also found a way to report on the flight with film footage as "Speeds through air in rocket airplane - Fritz von Opel, millionaire daredevil, goes one and a quarter miles in flying inferno".

On 30 September 1929, it first appeared as if the flight was never going to be made. At 9 a.m., von Opel entered the RAK.1 and prepared for liftoff. Just briefly before the anticipated launch, Major Hellmuth Felmy came up informing von Opel: "A telegram just came from the Oberpraesidium in Kassel. All flight tests are forbidden. Take off quick! I haven't had the telegram yet!". Winter reports on a comment by von Opel: "Felmy's willingness to risk his position to protect my first rocket flight from bureaucratic prohibitions is something I will never forget." The order for the catapult release could be given, but the first attempt failed. Fire and smoke leapt out of the big boosters, but the sustainers failed to ignite. The RAK-1 glided back to Earth at only 50 metres (164 ft.). At 11 a.m. a second attempt was made, but the result was similar to the initial launch attempt.

At about 3:30 or 4:00 in the afternoon another attempt was made. Aviation enthusiasts, von Opel's supporters and friends, and some of the media organizations were present. Stamer, Sander and von Opel's fiancee and future wife Margot Löwenstein (also known as Sellnik), were there as well. Sellnik, herself a pilot and one of Germany's six aviatrixes, had been another of von Opel's professional advisors on aviation for the previous several months. After the flight (according to one account), she was the first to run up and congratulate him. Ten minutes after the flight, von Opel wrote down his impressions, which he afterwards dispatched to The New York Times as his exclusive. "My first rocket flight!," he began. "...For today's flight I have trained for a year... For an hour before this morning's start I inspected the course and personally went over every detail of the plane — cables, fittings and rockets... Finally I draw a deep breath and then ignite. Tremendous pressure! I feel the machine racing forward. It tries to rear like a horse. Thus I race into space as in a dream, without any feeling for space or time. The machine practically flies itself. I scarcely need to touch the wheel. I only feel the boundless intoxicating joy of making a flight such as man has never made before... The force of the rockets has expired. Visions cease; actuality calls. I must return to Earth.. Gliding with terrible bumps along the ground, the plane comes to a halt."

Exact measurements of the flight were impossible. After he had levelled off to about 100 ft. (30.5 metres), the ground crew attempted to time the flight. It was determined that he was then going at 90 mph (150 km/h). According to Heinz Gartmann, "a downward gust of wind, coinciding with the edge of the landing ground, caused him to make a forced landing after only using up five rockets. At a speed of 80 mph (129 km/h) this was a difficult feat, and Opel hit the ground with a crash as the landing-skid broke and the cockpit floor was shaved away, leaving him hanging by his safety-belt with an inch to spare." Officially, von Opel had been aloft for an estimated 75 seconds, attaining a maximum velocity of 95 mph (153 km/h) and had traversed a distance of circa 3 km.

== Specifications (Opel RAK.1) ==
Data from J2mcL Planeurs - Hatry-Opel Rak 1, Les Ailes 10 October 1929

General characteristics

- Crew: 1
- Length: 5.41 m (17 ft 9 in)
- Wingspan: 11 m (36 ft 1 in)
- Height: 2 m (6 ft 7 in)
- Gross weight: 350 kg (772 lb)
- Powerplant: 16 × Sander black powder rockets, 0.4875 kN (109.6 lbf) thrust each (total thrust 7.8 kN (1,753.51 lbf))

Performance

- Maximum speed: 150 km/h (93 mph, 81 kn)
- Range: 1.5 km (0.93 mi, 0.81 nmi)

== Legacy and importance of Opel RAK for the history of spaceflight ==
- Biographic Aspects

Shortly after the September 1929 flight of RAK.1, the Opel rocket experiments were brought to an end by the Great Depression and the Opel company focused its engineering capacities on vehicle development. Von Opel left Germany before 1930, first to the US and eventually to France and Switzerland where he died in 1971. He lived long enough to see the fulfillment of his dreams with the successful Apollo missions which can be traced back to Opel RAK. His sister Elinor von Opel had to flee Germany in 1935 with her sons, Ernst Wilhelm Sachs von Opel and Gunter Sachs von Opel, due a legal battle on her divorce, particularly bitter about the custody of both sons, and because of her public aversion to Nazi leadership, friends of her former husband Willy Sachs. Elinor's German assets were blocked and confiscated by the German Reich government. Valier continued the rocket development after the Opel RAK break-up on his own. In collaboration with Heylandt-Werke, he also was focusing his efforts on liquid-fuelled rockets. Their first successful test firing with liquid fuel (five minutes) occurred in the Heylandt plant on 25 January 1930. Valier was killed less than a month later when an alcohol-fuelled rocket exploded on his test bench in Berlin. He is considered the first fatality of the dawning space age. His protégé Arthur Rudolph went on to develop an improved and safer version of Valier's engine. Sander was eventually engaged in the 1930s in German military projects under General Walter R. Dornberger but was imprisoned for treason by the Nazis and forced to sell his business, he died in 1938. Hatry tried to continue the work on his aircraft developments, but was sidelined by the Nazis since he had a Jewish grandfather. He had to start anew and became a screenwriter and documentary filmmaker. Finally, Hatry is drawn into theater and fiction. As last survivor of the original RAK.1 aircraft team, he died in 2000.

- Technology aspects

The impact of Opel RAK was both immediate and long-lasting on later spaceflight pioneers, but also on the general audience and media. The experiments, not only the first rocket-powered flights but also the speed records of the land vehicles, were described in the media as the start of a new era:

»… Nevertheless, few, if any, among the many thousands of onlookers who witnessed the demonstration on the AVUS track could help but feel that we are poised at the beginning of a new era.« (…) P. Friedmann, Das Motorrad No. 12/1928, June 9, 1928

»The amazing thing about Opel’s rocket run on the AVUS track in Berlin is not just the daring feat itself, but its aftermath: Both the public and academics have finally seen the light and have begun to believe in the future of the rocket as an engine for new rapid transit devices.« Otto Willi Gail, Illustrierte Zeitung, Leipzig, 1928

Opel, Sander, Valier and Hatry had engaged in a program that led directly to use of jet-assisted takeoff for heavily laden aircraft. The German Reich was first to test the approach in August 1929 when a battery of solid rocket propellants supported a Junkers Ju-33 seaplane to get airborne. The Opel RAK experiments had a tremendous influence on Lippisch, whose experience with the rocket-powered "Ente" eventually paved the way to the Messerschmitt Me-163, the first operational rocket fighter craft. The Opel RAK experiments excited also the interest of the German military, which provided funding for further development of rockets as a replacement for artillery. This led to an array of military applications, among them Germany's V-2 terror weapon, the world’s first ballistic missile. After World War II, these German rocket and missile scientists and engineers would have an immense impact on missile and space programs by the United States of America. Walter J. Boyne, Director of the National Air and Space Museum in Washington, DC, concluded "Working together, von Opel, Valier, and Sander had thrown a big rock of publicity into the mill pond of science. The ripples have not yet ceased to spread."

== Universal Newsreel video footage of RAK.1 flight ==
- (Youtube) video clip: Fritz Von Opel with his Opel RAK 1 rocket air plane. HD Stock Footage
