= Opel-RAK =

Series of rocket vehicles

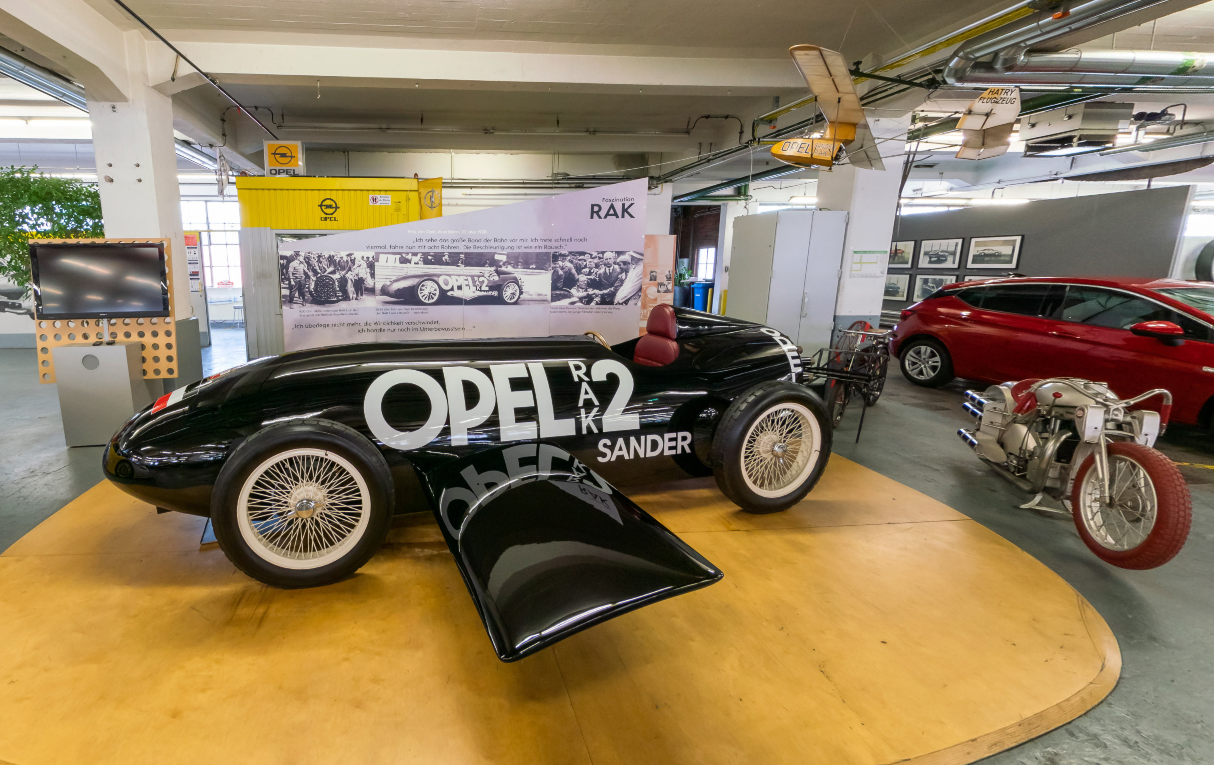
- Rocket-powered Opel RAK.2, RAK-Motoclub motorcycle and RAK.1 aircraft replica
- Country of origin: Germany
- Date: 1928; 98 years ago
- Designer: Fritz von Opel, Max Valier, Friedrich Sander, Kurt C. Volkhart, Julius Hatry
- Manufacturer: Opel
- Application: First demonstration and popularization of rockets as practical means of propulsion for land vehicles, aviation and spaceflight
- Successor: German state-sponsored rocket programs, US state-sponsored rocket and space programs
- Status: World's first rocket program

Rocket Vehicles

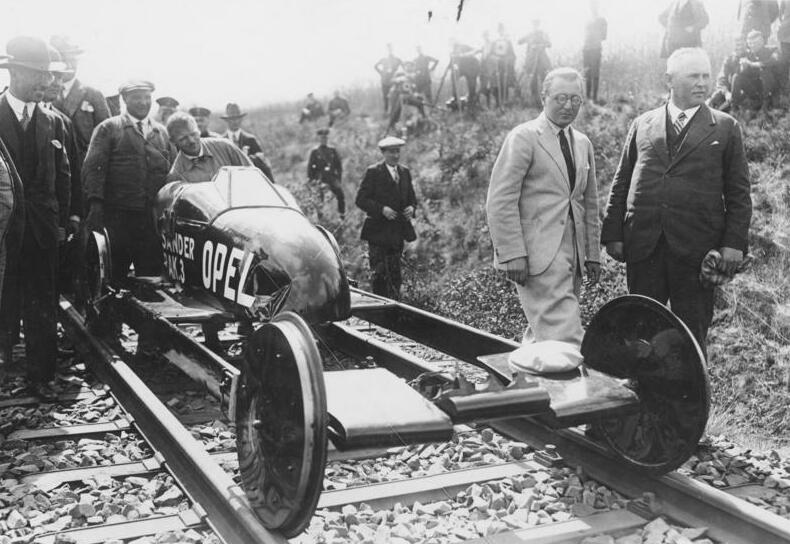
Rocket rail vehicle Opel RAK.3 in June 1928 world speed record event near Burgwedel in Northern Germany

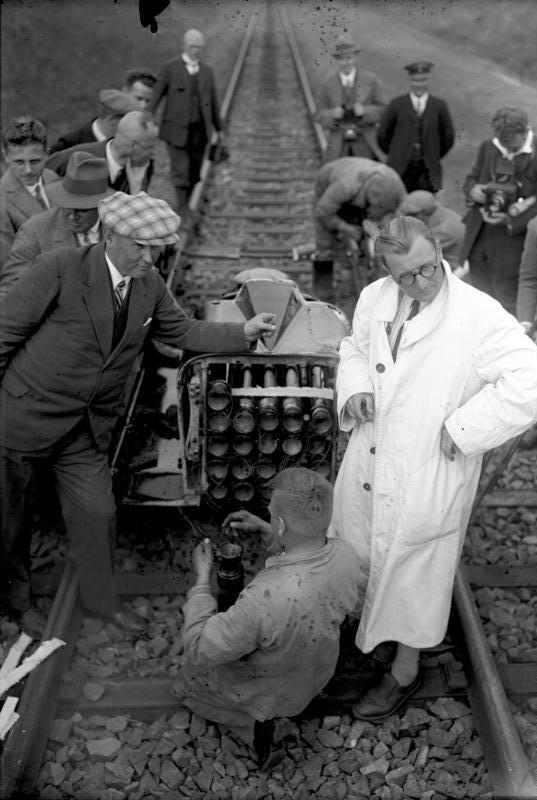
Rocket installation. On the right Fritz von Opel, the left Friedrich Wilhelm Sander.

Opel-RAK were a series of rocket vehicles produced by German automobile manufacturer Fritz von Opel, of the Opel car company, in association with others, including Max Valier, Julius Hatry, and Friedrich Wilhelm Sander. Opel RAK is generally considered the world's first large-scale rocket program, significantly advancing rocket and aviation technology as well as instrumental in popularizing rockets as means of propulsion. In addition Opel RAK demonstrations were also highly successful as publicity stunts for the Opel car company. The Lippisch Ente (meaning “duck” in German), the world's first rocket-powered glider and piloted for its first flight on June 11, 1928, by Fritz Stamer at Wasserkuppe, was bought and operated by Opel in context of the Opel RAK program but is not formally designated an Opel RAK series number. Also a rocket-powered RAK-Motoclub motorcycle, based on a conventional Opel Motoclub 500 SS and presented at the Berlin Motorshow 1928, did not receive a formal RAK number.

- Opel RAK.1 - a rocket car that achieved 75 km/h (47 mph) in March 1928 and more than 100 km/h in April of the same year
- Opel RAK.2 - rocket car tested May 23, 1928; reached a speed of 238 km/h (145 mph) driven by 24 solid-fuel rockets
- Opel RAK.3 - rocket rail vehicle (quoted speed is variously 254 or 290 km/h.) On the second run the vehicle jumped the track and was destroyed.
- Opel RAK.4 - rocket rail vehicle, destroyed when a solid rocket exploded on the track, exploding all the other rockets. Railway authorities prohibited further runs.
- Opel RAK.1 - rocket plane flown September 30, 1929.

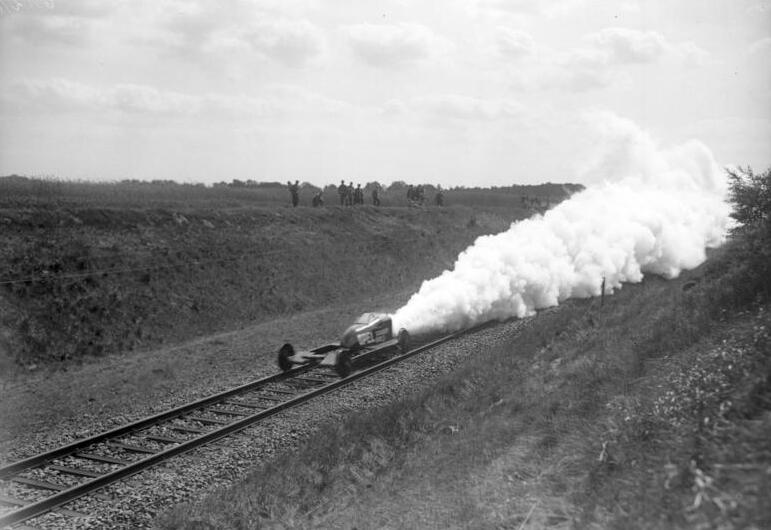
RAK.3 rocket train during burn

== Opel RAK set-up and objectives ==
The idea to build and race a rocket-powered car was suggested to Von Opel by Max Valier. After the war, Valier became highly interested in rocketry. Valier, in 1927, became one of the founders of the German Verein für Raumschiffahrt, or “Spaceflight Society,” a group of later highly influential scientists who would play a major role in making rocket spaceflight a reality. Valier was more interested in publicizing rocketry than marketing Opel automobiles but came to the conclusion that building a successful rocket-powered car would achieve both goals. Von Opel confirmed his interest in realizing Valier's proposal. On behalf of Von Opel, Valier eventually contacted Friedrich Wilhelm Sander, a German pyrotechnical engineer who, in 1923, had purchased H.G. Cordes, a Bremerhaven firm famous for its manufacture of black-powder rockets used mainly for harpoons, signal devices and similar devices. Opel, Sander and Valier joined forces and combined into one entity with the financing, the theoretical knowledge, and the practical capability necessary for success. Moreover, von Opel, Valier, and Sander said from the start that their experiments with cars were only a prelude to grander experiments with air and spacecraft: They agreed on the final goal of working on rocket-powered aircraft at the same time they were building their famous rocket cars, as pre-condition for the anticipated spaceflight application

== Rocket-powered land vehicles ==
Opel as heir and director of the Opel company made the respective factory and testing track resources in Rüsselsheim, Germany, available for their program. The three men began their experiments using a standard Opel automobile. Von Opel wanted to be the test driver, but Sander and Valier talked him out of it. If something happened to him, they were convinced, all resources from the Opel company backing would be stopped. A regular Opel test driver, Kurt C. Volkhart, was drafted to pilot the experimental vehicle. March 12, 1928, was selected as the date for the car's first trial run, applying only two rockets, which were to be ignited by conventional string fuses, for low-speed testing.

The group went to an Opel race car, “RAK 1.” The RAK 1 demonstrator was stripped of its engine and radiator to reduce weight. To help keep the car's wheels on the ground at expected high speeds, the group attached behind each front wheel a small, wing-like stub, set at a negative angle of attack. For propulsion, they elected to use 12 black-powder rockets, mounted in four rows of three rockets each that were ignited electrically. The propellant, similar to gunpowder, burned in a subsonic deflagration wave and not in a supersonic detonation wave. A demonstration for the press on April 11, 1928, in Rüsselsheim was arranged: Opel engineer and race driver Kurt C. Volkhart developed and tested the Opel-RAK 1, a converted racing car equipped with Sander rockets instead of an internal combustion engine, was the first rocket powered automobile. During the April 1928 experimentations RAK 1 reached, piloted by Volkhart, the symbolic speed of 100 km/h in just eight seconds.

Von Opel, Sander and Valier were satisfied by RAK 1's performance, and in particular by the attracted positive publicity for the science of rocketry, but also the Opel company. Nevertheless, it was clear to the RAK program leadership, they had no plans to commercially produce rocket cars for end customers, the aim was the development and demonstration of a rocket-powered aircraft. The group continued their land projects and built RAK 2, designed from the ground up by Volkhart as a rocket car. It was far larger and more streamlined than its predecessor. The RAK 2 was powered by 24 rockets packing 264 pounds of explosives. On May 23, 1928, Fritz von Opel himself demonstrated the car, Opel RAK 2, on the Avus Speedway near Berlin. Prior to the start Professor Johann Schütte, Chairman of the Scientific Society of Aviation, and Fritz von Opel held prophetic speeches on the future of rocket-based aviation and spaceflight. After these introductory remarks, mechanics August Becker and Karl Treber then took the tarpaulin off the Opel RAK 2 and carefully pushed it to the start. Eventually the rockets were installed and connected to the ignition mechanism. Police cleared the AVUS track and von Opel drove the RAK 2 car to a record-setting speed of 238 km/h, successfully mastering the challenge of insufficient downforce from the wings for these velocities. The RAK 2 rockets were operational for a ride of circa three minutes, watched by 3000 spectators and world media, among them Fritz Lang, director of Metropolis and Woman in the Moon, world boxing champion Max Schmeling and many more sports and show business celebrities:

… Nevertheless, few, if any, among the many thousands of onlookers who witnessed the demonstration on the AVUS track could help but feel that we are poised at the beginning of a new era. P. Friedmann, Das Motorrad No. 12/1928, June 9, 1928

A world record for rail vehicles was reached with RAK3 on June 23, 1928, with the car attaining a top speed of 256 km/h over a 5-km stretch of straight track near Hanover. Some 20,000 spectators watched RAK 3 breaking the existing world speed record of railcars by nearly 40 km/h. The resulting international publicity after RAK2 and RAK3 demonstrations was enormous and gave the science of rocketry a major boost. A replica of the RAK 2 rocket-propelled car is on display at the Opel museum in Rüsselsheim, another one at the "Deutsches Museum" in Munich.

== Opel RAK rocket planes ==
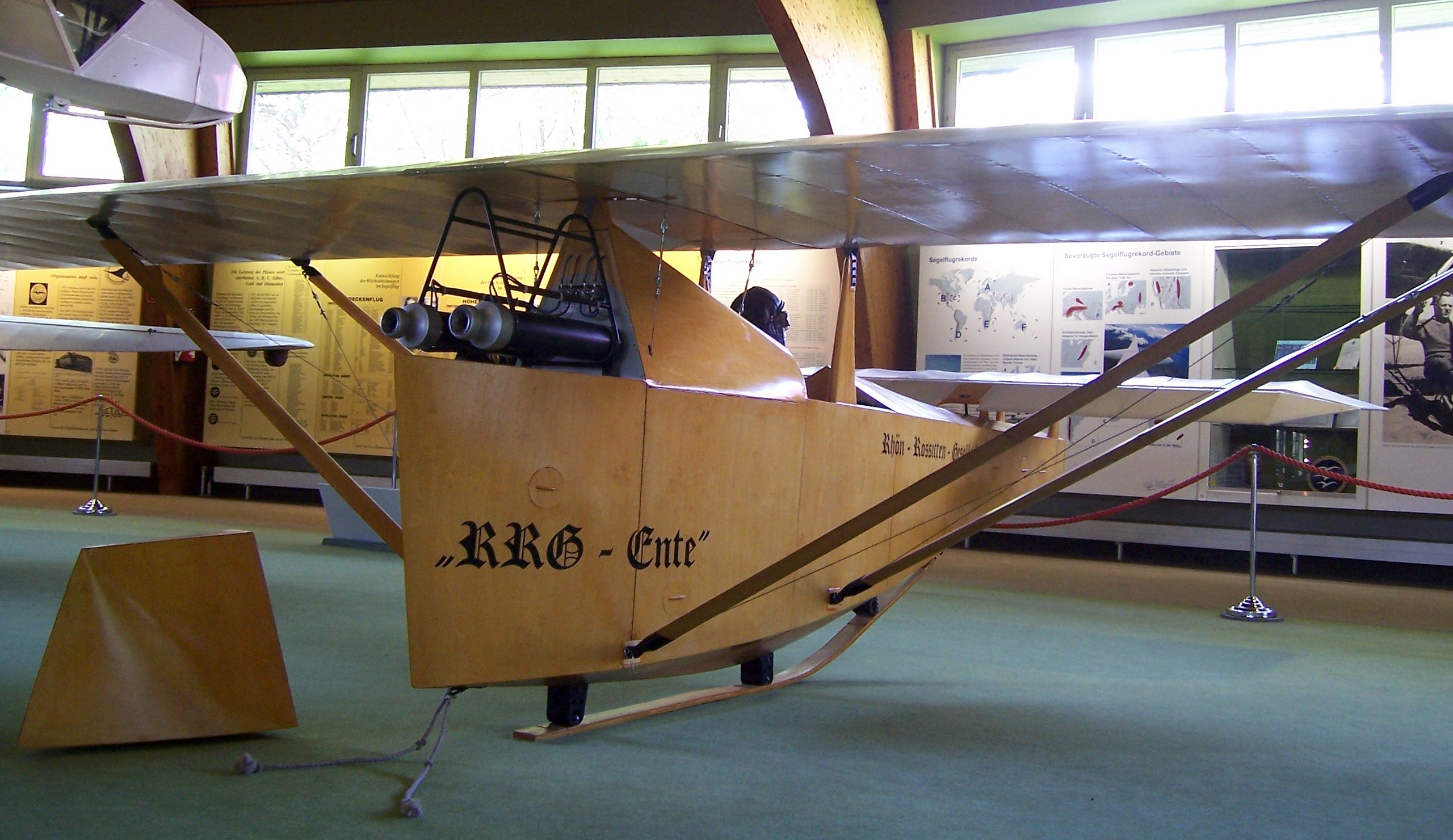
Replica of "Raketen-Ente", an Alexander Lippisch designed sailplane, bought by Opel and equipped with two of Friedrich Sander's Opel RAK rockets; on display in Deutsches Segelflugmuseum at Wasserkuppe

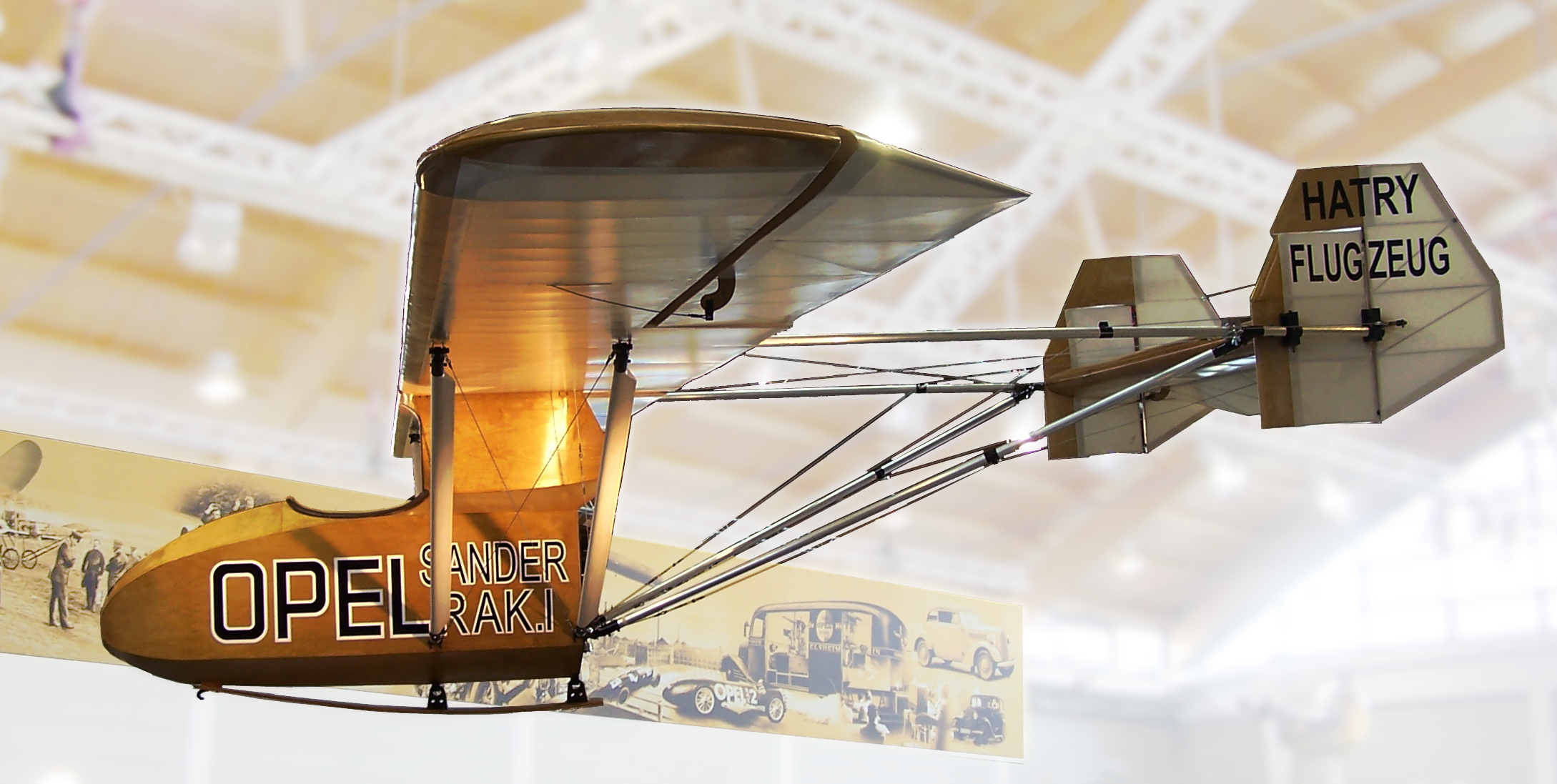
Replica of Opel RAK.1, the world's first purpose-built rocket plane

After testing at Wasserkuppe, in June 1928, Fritz von Opel had purchased an Alexander Lippisch-designed sailplane, the Ente, and fitted it with rockets. Fritz Stamer was the pilot during the OPEL RAK experimentations with Lippisch's design. Opel did not get the chance to fly it, however, as the aircraft was destroyed by an engine explosion on its second test flight. With a wingspan of just under 40 feet, and a length of some 14 feet, the Ente featured a canoe-like fuselage, canard surfaces, and rudders mounted outboard on a straight rectangular wing. Each of the aircraft's two 44-pound-thrust rocket engines were tightly packed with about eight pounds of black powder. Designed to fire in sequence, the rockets were ignited electrically by the pilot. An automatic counterweight system was set to adjust the aircraft's center of gravity as the rocket fuel was consumed. An elastic launching rope was used to catapult the Ente into the air. After one false start, the aircraft took off and flew a 1,500 metre (4,900 ft) circuit of the Wasserkuppe's landing strip. On the second flight, the team decided to try firing both rockets together for increased thrust over a shorter period. Something went wrong, however, and rather than burning properly, one of the rockets exploded, punching holes in both wings and setting the aircraft ablaze. Stamer was nevertheless able to bring it down from a height of around 20 metres (65 ft) before hastily abandoning the Ente, which was burned beyond any hope of salvage.

Despite the loss of the first rocket plane, von Opel immediately contracted with Julius Hatry for a specialized rocket aircraft. Hatry's design for Opel was rather more elegant than the Ente. With a wingspan of 36 feet and length of 16 feet, the new aircraft Opel RAK.1 had a typical sailplane wing, under which a pod was suspended to accommodate the pilot and sixteen of Sander's solid rocket engines each with 50 pounds of thrust. The tailplane was mounted on booms behind the wing and high out of the way of the rocket exhaust.

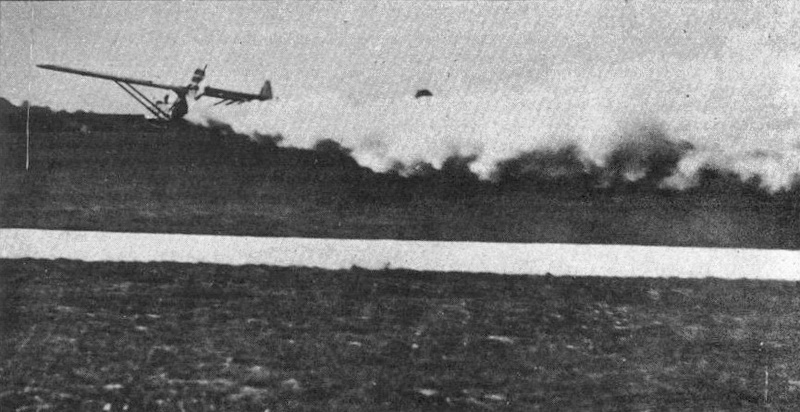
Opel RAK.1, world's first public flight of a rocket-powered aircraft on September 30, 1929

The first public flight came on Sept. 30, 1929. Before a large crowd assembled outside of Frankfurt, the intrepid von Opel made a successful flight of almost 3.5 km in 75 seconds, reaching an estimated top speed of around 150 km/h. RAK.1 made a hard landing, but it had made an emphatic point about rocket aviation and popularized rockets as means of propulsion immensely, causing a so-called global "rocket rumble". The aircraft is sometimes also referred to as the Opel-Hatry RAK.1 or Opel-Sander RAK.1 in acknowledgment of its builder or the supplier of its engines respectively. In still other references it is called the RAK.3 to distinguish it from Opel's previous RAK.1 and RAK.2 rocket cars. As it happened, all three names, Opel, Sander, and Hatry were painted on the aircraft (with Opel's most prominent), as was the RAK.1 designation.

The Mannheim Museum of Technology, Technoseum, has a replica of RAK.1 as the world's first dedicated rocket-plane on display. The original aircraft designer of the Opel RAK.1, Julius Hatry, personally supervised the construction of the aircraft replica.

== Liquid-fuel rocket development, test launches and a planned flight across the English channel ==
According to Frank H. Winter, curator at National Air and Space Museum in Washington, DC, the Opel group was also working on liquid-fuel rockets (SPACEFLIGHT, Vol. 21,2, Feb. 1979): In a cabled exclusive to The New York Times on 30 September 1929, von Opel is quoted as saying: "Sander and I now want to transfer the liquid rocket from the laboratory to practical use. With the liquid rocket I hope to be the first man to thus fly across the English Channel. I will not rest until I have accomplished that." At a speech on the donation of a RAK 2 replica to the Deutsches Museum, von Opel mentioned also Opel engineer Josef Schaberger as a key collaborator. "He belonged," von Opel said, "with the same enthusiasm as Sander to our small secret group, one of the tasks of which was to hide all the preparations from my father, because his paternal apprehensions led him to believe that I was cut out for something better than being a rocket researchist. Schaberger supervised all the details involved in construction and assembly (of rocket cars), and every time I sat behind the wheel with a few hundred pounds of explosives in my rear, and made the first contact, I did so with a feeling of total security [...] As early as 1928, Mr. Schaberger and I developed a liquid rocket, which was definitely the first permanently operating rocket in which the explosive was injected into the combustion chamber and simultaneously cooled using pumps. [...] We used benzol as the fuel," von Opel continued, "and nitrogen tetroxide as the oxidizer. This rocket was installed in a Mueller-Griessheim aircraft and developed a thrust of 70 kg (154 lb.)." By May 1929, the engine produced a thrust of 200 kg (440 lb.) "for longer than fifteen minutes and in July 1929, the Opel RAK collaborators were able to attain powered phases of more than thirty minutes for thrusts of 300 kg (660-lb.) at Opel's works in Rüsselsheim," according to Max Valier's account.

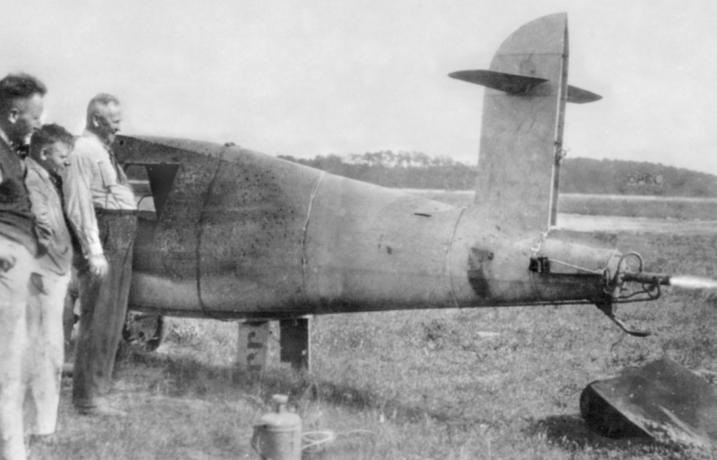
Friedrich Sander, Opel RAK technician August Becker and Opel employee Karl Treber (from right to left) in front of Opel liquid-fuel rocket-plane prototype while test operation

Max Valier also reports the launch of two experimental liquid-fuel rockets by Sander on April 10 and 12, 1929. In the preface of his book “Raketenfahrt” he describes the size of the rockets as of 21 cm in diameter and with a length of 74 cm, weighing 7 kg empty and 16 kg with fuel. The maximum thrust was 45 to 50 kp, with a total burning time of 132 seconds. These properties indicate a gas pressure pumping. The first missile rose so quickly that Sander lost sight of it. Two days later, a second unit was ready to go, Sander tied a 4,000-meter-long rope to the rocket. After 2000 m of rope had been unwound, the line broke and this rocket also disappeared in the area, probably near the Opel proving ground and racetrack in Rüsselsheim, the "Rennbahn". The main purpose of these tests was to develop the propulsion system for the aircraft for crossing the English channel. Therefore, the flights of these two (compared to the airplane) small rockets were not published. The combustion tests with the aircraft rocket engine proved successful. Unfortunately the plane was destroyed during a nightly transport on a truck on the Opel factory grounds, as the senior boss Wilhelm von Opel felt disturbed by the engine noise and wanted to stop this new “dangerous madness” of his son.

== Opel RAK break-up and legacy ==
Shortly after these activities and the September 1929 flight of RAK.1, the Opel rocket experiments were brought to an end by the Great Depression and also the Opel company focused its engineering capacities on vehicle development. Von Opel left Germany before 1930, first to the US and eventually to France and Switzerland where he died. He lived long enough to see the fulfillment of his dreams with the successful Apollo missions which can be traced back to Opel RAK. His sister Elinor von Opel had to flee Germany in 1935 with her sons, Ernst Wilhelm Sachs von Opel and Gunter Sachs von Opel, due to a legal battle on her divorce, particularly bitter about the custody of both sons, and because of her public aversion to Nazi leadership, friends of her former husband Willy Sachs. Elinor's German assets were blocked and confiscated by the German Reich government.

Valier continued the rocket development after the Opel RAK break-up on his own. In collaboration with Heylandt-Werke, he also was focusing his efforts on liquid-fuelled rockets. Their first successful test firing with liquid fuel (five minutes) occurred in the Heylandt plant on 25 January 1930. Valier was killed less than a month later when an alcohol-fuelled rocket exploded on his test bench in Berlin. He is considered the first fatality of the dawning space age. His protégé Arthur Rudolph went on to develop an improved and safer version of Valier's engine.

Sander was eventually engaged in the 1930s in German military projects under General Walter R. Dornberger but was imprisoned for treason by the Nazis and forced to sell his business, he died in custody 1938.

Hatry tried to continue the work on his aircraft developments, but was sidelined by the Nazis since he had a Jewish grandfather. He had to start anew and became a screenwriter and documentary filmmaker. Hatry was drawn into theater and fiction, finally his mother convinced him after his father's death to take over the family's real-estate business.

The impact of Opel RAK was both immediate and long-lasting on later spaceflight pioneers. Opel, Sander, Valier and Hatry had engaged in a program that led directly to use of jet-assisted takeoff for heavily laden aircraft. The German Reich was first to test the approach in August 1929 when a battery of solid rocket propellants supported a Junkers Ju-33 seaplane to get airborne. The Opel RAK experiments had a tremendous influence on Lippisch, whose experience with the rocket-powered "Ente" eventually paved the way to the Messerschmitt Me-163, the first operational rocket fighter craft. The Opel RAK experiments excited also the interest of the German military, which provided funding for further development of rockets as a replacement for artillery. This led to an array of military applications, among them Germany's V-2 weapon, the world's first ballistic missile. After World War II, these German rocket and missile scientists and engineers would have an immense impact on missile and space programs by the United States of America. Walter J. Boyne, Director of the National Air and Space Museum in Washington, DC, concluded "Working together, von Opel, Valier, and Sander had thrown a big rock of publicity into the mill pond of science. The ripples have not yet ceased to spread."

== Film footage ==
The 1937 German film Weltraumschiff I Startet - Eine Technische Fantasie has short clips of various RAK vehicles: 11 seconds at 436 feet (about 04:47) igniters being wired to the RAK.2 car; 2 seconds at 447 feet (about 04:58) Max Valier seated in a RAK.2 car labeled "RÜCKSTOSS-VERSUCHS-WAGEN"; 2 seconds at 451 feet (about 05:00) Fritz von Opel seated in a RAK.2 car; 11 seconds at 460 feet (about 05:06) Fritz Von Opel drives the RAK.2 car on 1928 May 23 at the Avus Track in Berlin; 2 seconds at 472 feet (05:14) Sander-Opel RAK.3 rocket car on 1928 June 23 running on railway tracks; 19 seconds at 475 feet (05:16 to 05:35) Opel-Sander RAK.1 rocket glider in 1928 September, preparation and launch; 6 seconds at 536 feet (05:57 to 06:03) Max Valier sitting and talking in a RAK.6 car.
