= Lippisch Ente =

Type of aircraft

Ente
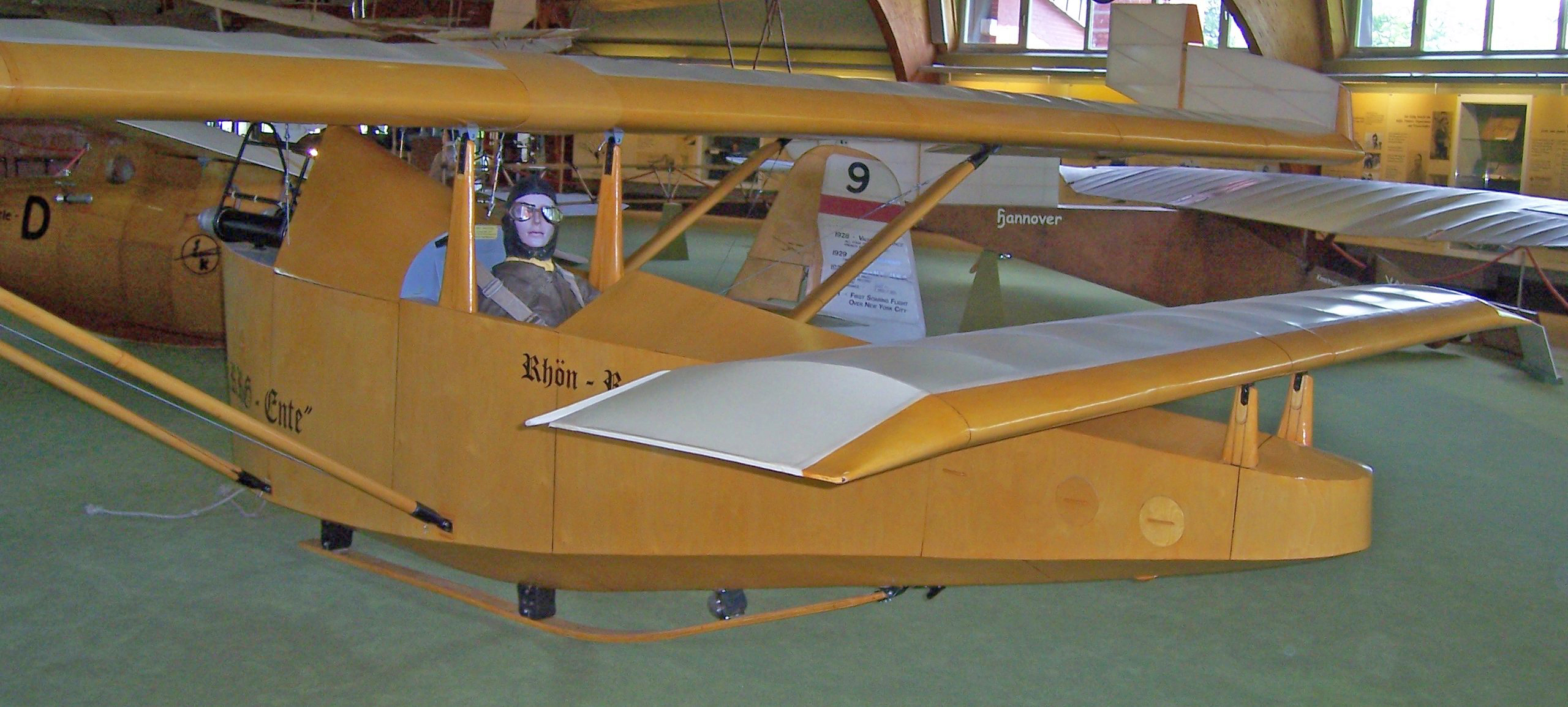
- RRG Raketen-Ente

General information
- Type: Experimental glider
- National origin: Germany
- Manufacturer: Alexander Lippisch and Opel-RAK
- Designer: Alexander Lippisch (glider); Fritz von Opel, Max Valier, Friedrich Sander (rocket propulsion)
- Status: Destroyed
- Number built: 1

History
- First flight: 11 June 1928

The Ente (German: duck) was the world's first full-sized rocket-powered aircraft. Its name was derived from the forward canards used to control the aircraft.

The Ente was designed by the German aeronautical engineer Alexander Lippisch in 1928 following a meeting with the pyrotechnics manufacturer Friedrich Sander and rocketry specialist Max Valier. Throughout these individuals, its development was connected to the Opel-RAK rocket program, headed by the tycoon Fritz von Opel. The Ente was powered a pair of rear-mounted rockets that ran on compressed black powder; Lippisch's innovative tail-less designs were particularly permissive for installation of the rockets. Developed within the space of three months, von Opel purchased the completed aircraft shortly before the start of flight testing. On 11 June 1928, the Ente, piloted by Fritz Stamer, performed its maiden flight at the Wasserkuppe. That same day, it was heavily damaged during its second flight when one of the rockets exploded and caused a fire. One year later, it was effectively succeeded by the Opel RAK.1.

== Development ==
During the late 1920s, German tycoon Fritz von Opel performed a variety of demonstrations involving rocket-powered vehicles to generate publicity for the German vehicle manufacturer Opel. For this endeavour, von Opel had obtained the assistance of the pyrotechnics manufacturer Friedrich Sander as well as the rocketry advocate Max Valier. Valier was less enthused on the application of rockets to ground vehicles as he was in using them to power aircraft. Following the enactment of a (temporary) ban on rocket-powered cars on safety grounds, this avenue was promptly explored.

In March 1928, Sander and Valier visited the Wasserkuppe, a mountain which had become the focus point for Germany's gliding community, to investigate the potential integration of rockets onto a lightweight aircraft. During their visit, they came across the innovative tail-less gliders produced by the aeronautical engineer Alexander Lippisch and personally met with Lippisch, although Valier did not disclose his identity or full intent initially. Valier discreetly questioned Lippish to gauge the suitability of his designs being adapted to use rocket propulsion, although he only referred to it being a 'high power rear mounted engine' during this first encounter. In turn, Lippisch gave convincing answers that led to Sander and Valier persuading him to design a purpose-build glider for their purposes. It was only after the meeting that the nature of his new customer became apparent to Lippisch.

Three months later, von Opel, Sander, and Valier returned to purchase the completed aircraft for Lippisch, which he had named Ente in reference to its forward-mounted canards.

A pair of rockets were installed in the rear of the aircraft; an electrical ignition system was fitted which could be activated by the pilot via a switch in the cockpit. These rockets were fuelled with compressed black powder. Furthermore, a counterweight system was also installed, located under the floor of the cockpit; this device automatically adjusted the aircraft's center of gravity, which shifted considerably as the active rockets consumed their fuel. The rockets were intended to be fired one after the other, so that they provide continuous thrust for as long as possible, each having a burn time of around 30 seconds. Fritz Stamer, who had long been a test pilot for Lippisch's designs, was selected to fly the aircraft.

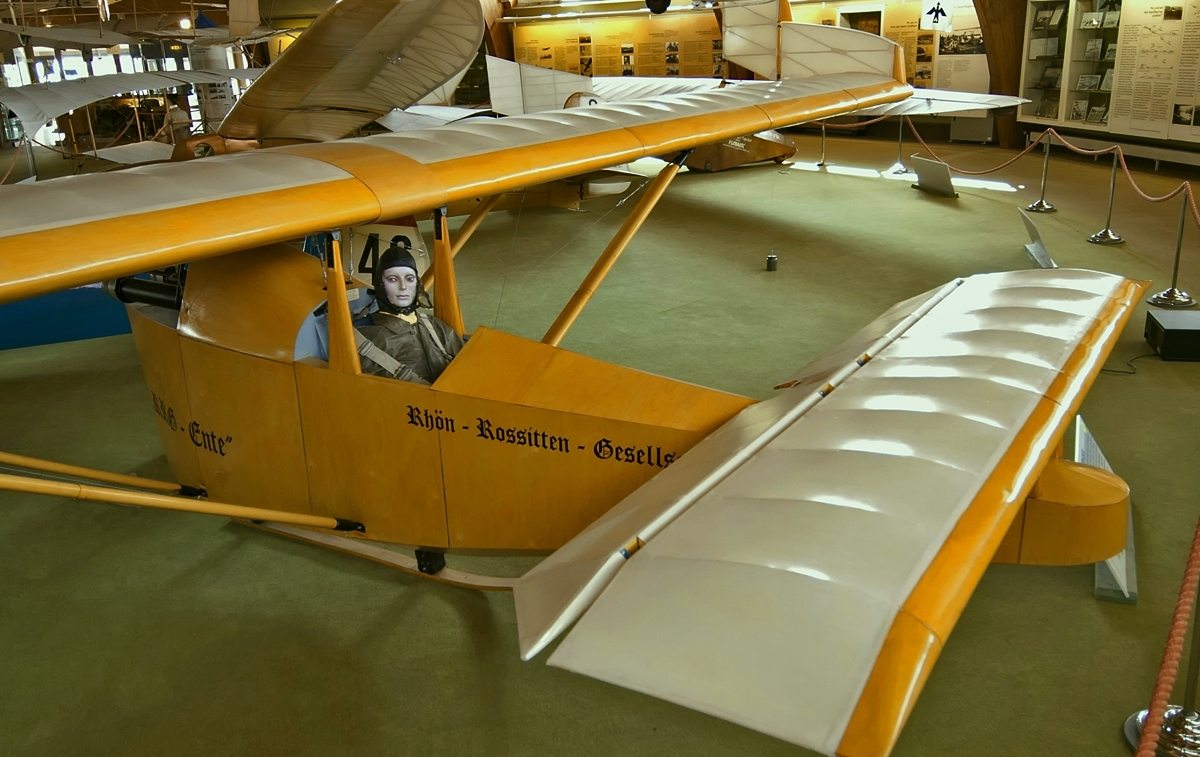
Replica of the Ente on display, 2013

On 11 June 1928, the first attempted test flight of the Ente was aborted on the ground after the rockets failed to ignite. A second attempt that same day was successful, resulting in the aircraft taking off and performing a 1,500 metre (4,900 ft) circuit of the Wasserkuppe's landing strip before landing safely. This milestone was not only the maiden flight of the Ente, but also the first flight of a rocket plane in the world. Stamer observed of this flight that the aircraft was barely controllable during the rocket-powered ascent.

It was promptly decided to attempt a second flight that same day, although this attempt proved to be fairly disastrous. For this flight attempt, the team decided to try firing both rockets together to generate increased thrust over a shorter period. However, while one rocket ignited as expected, the other rocket exploded, punching holes in both wings and setting the aircraft alight. Furthermore, the single intact rocket quickly accelerated the Ente into the air, despite its control surfaces not functioning correctly and the aircraft still burning. Despite these adverse circumstances, Stamer was able to perform an emergency landing, barely escaped with his life while the Ente was badly burnt by the fire.

Despite the abrupt end of the Ente, von Opel was not dissuaded from the concept. He promptly chose to commission a second glider, albeit one with a somewhat traditional configuration, to continue rocket propulsion experiments. This aircraft, the Opel RAK.1, was effectively the successor to the Ente, and performed a highly-publicised demonstration flight before the media and members of the general public, piloted by von Opel himself, during September 1929.

== Specifications ==
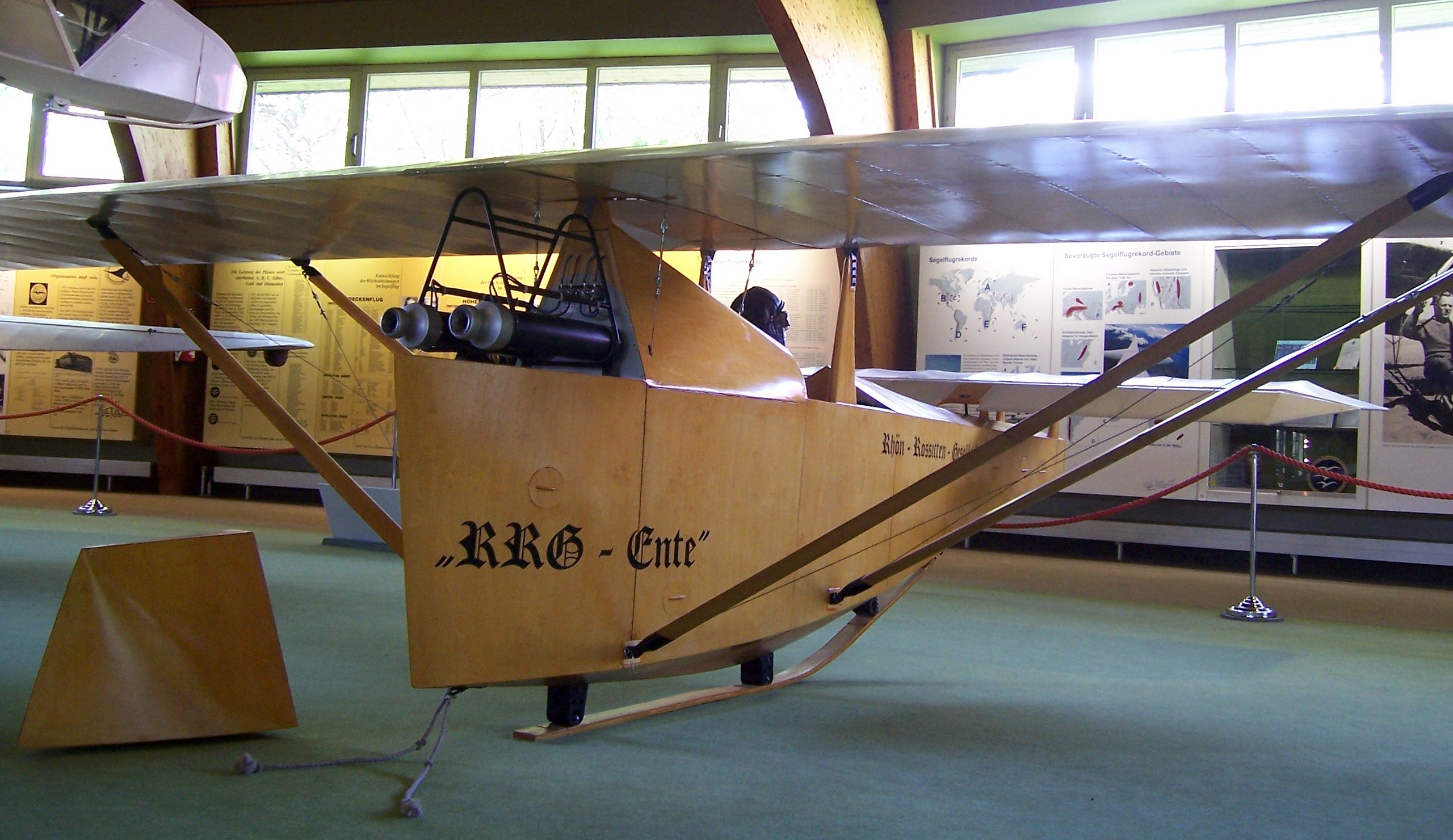
RRG Raketen-Ente in Deutsches Segelflugmuseum

Data from RRG-Raketen Ente

General characteristics

- Crew: 1
- Length: 4.31 m (14 ft 2 in)
- Wingspan: 11.94 m (39 ft 2 in)
- Wing area: 20.3 m^{2} (219 sq ft)
- Aspect ratio: 7
- Powerplant: 2 × Sander black powder rockets, 0.1962 kN (44.1 lbf) thrust each

Performance

- Range: 1.5 km (0.93 mi, 0.81 nmi)
