= Fronius =

Fronius is a German surname of Transylvanian Saxon origin. The Fronius family maintained an aristocratic status within the autonomous region of Siebenbürgen.

People with the surname include:

- Andreas Fronius (c. 1500-?), city magistrate of Kronstadt, Siebenbürgen, and father of Matthias Fronius
- Franz Friedrich Fronius (1829–1886), Transylvanian-Saxon botanist, ethnologist and Lutheran cleric
- Günter Fronius (born 1907-2015), Austrian entrepreneur
  - Fronius International, an Austrian company founded by Günter Fronius
- Hans Fronius (1903-1988), Austrian painter and illustrator
- Marcus Fronius (1659-1713), Lutheran theologian, pedagogue and author
- Matthias Fronius (1522-1588), Lutheran cleric and city magistrate of Kronstadt
- Sigrid Fronius (born 1942), German author and journalist
