= List of Transylvanian Saxons =

This is a list of famous Transylvanian Saxons.

== Academics ==
- Adele Zay (1848–1928), pedagogue and teacher training administrator who spread Fröbel's theories on Kindergartens

== Artists ==
- Wilhelm Georg Berger, composer
- Friedrich von Bömches, painter
- Hans Fronius, painter and illustrator
- Steve Holmes, adult film actor
- Peter Maffay, singer
- Edith Soterius von Sachsenheim, painter
- Hymie Shertzer, musician big band era

== Noble families ==
- House of Soterius von Sachsenheim
- Fronius family

== Politicians ==
- Samuel von Brukenthal, former Habsburg governor of Transylvania
- Stephan Ludwig Roth, intellectual, Lutheran pastor, revolutionary
- Michael Weiß, former mayor of Mediaș/Mediasch
- Johannes Benkner, former mayor of Brașov/Kronstadt
- Christian Tell, former mayor of Bucharest
- Michael Trein, former mayor of Prejmer (German: Tartlau)
- Daniel Thellmann, former mayor of Mediaș (German: Mediasch)
- Klaus Johannis, President of Romania 2014–2025 and former mayor of Sibiu/Hermannstadt 2000–2014
- Astrid Fodor, current mayor of Sibiu/Hermannstadt (since 2014 onwards)
- Iancu Sasul, former Prince of Moldavia during the late 16th century
- Hans Otto Roth, parliamentary deputy (1919–1938) and former parliamentary chairman of the German Party

== Scientists ==
- Conrad Haas, military engineer, pioneer of rocket propulsion
- Hermann Oberth, space flight technology pioneer
- Hannah Monyer, physician and researcher
- Ignaz Edler von Born, Mineralogist/Metallurgist

== Sportsmen ==
- Michael Klein, professional soccer player
- Martin Fabi, football player - CFL
- Randy Fabi, football player - CFL
- Otto Hindrich, professional soccer player

== Writers ==
- Johannes Honter (Latin: Ioannes Honterus), theologian
- Christian Schesaeus, poet, humanist, and Lutheran pastor
- Johann Sommer (Latin: Ioannes Sommerus), theologian
- Josef Haltrich, author of fairytales/stories for children from the Transylvanian Saxon folklore
- Dutz Schuster, writer and poet
- Oskar Pastior, poet
