= Johann Schmidlap =

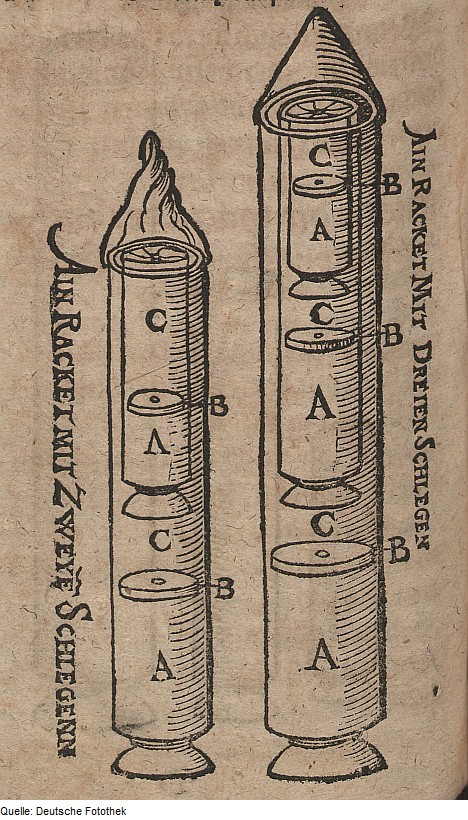
Diagram of a two-stage and a three-stage rocket from Schmidlap's book.

Johann Schmidlap was a 16th-century Bavarian fireworks maker and rocket pioneer. Schmidlap was most likely born in Schorndorf, but not much is known about his life. He is occasionally referred to by the nicknames von Schorndorff or the Elder.

== Life ==
He published a book on fireworks, Künstliche und rechtschaffene Feuerwerck zum Schimpff ("artful and well-made fireworks for entertainment"), printed in Nuremberg in 1561 (reprinted 1564, new edition by Katharina Gerlachin in 1590, 1591).

== Achievements ==
He may have been the first to successfully fly staged rockets, although the concept is also discussed in the work of Conrad Haas, which was a direct influence on Schmidlap.

== See also ==
- Kazimierz Siemienowicz
