= Simonavičius =

Simonavičius is the masculine form of a Lithuanian family name. Its feminine forms are: Simonavičienė (married woman or widow) and Simonavičiūtė (unmarried woman).

The surname may refer to:

- Kazimieras Simonavičius (1600–1651), Polish-Lithuanian general of artillery
- Jaunius Simonavičius (born 1954), Lithuanian politician, viceminister
