= Andreas Fronius =

Andreas Fronius (born c. 1500 Siebenbürgen) was Stadtrichter (English: city magistrate) for Kronstadt, Siebenbürgen, and the father of Matthias Fronius.

== See also ==
- Fronius
