= Marcus Fronius =

Marcus Fronius (1659 – 14 April 1713) was a Lutheran theologian, pedagogue, and author whose published works covered topics such as theology, metaphysics, and humoral physiology.

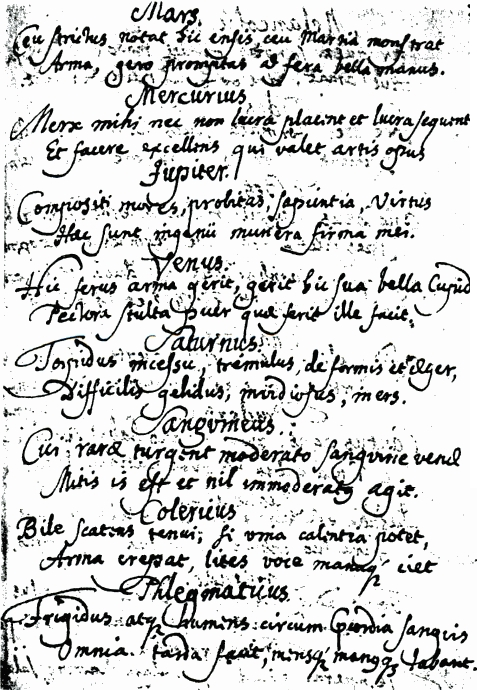
Facsimile of late 17th-century writings on humoral physiology by Marcus Fronius

Fronius, a Transylvanian Saxon, was born in Neustadt, Siebenbürgen, and studied under the tutelage of Johann Deutschmann and Abraham Calovius, obtaining an M.Th. from the University of Wittenberg in 1682.

He was also a poet and musician of some note, having composed pieces to accompany the Lutheran Mass; and was said to have had "extraordinary skill in drawing and in the Latin language." He died in Kronstadt, Siebenbürgen.

[see also Fronius]

== Works by Marcus Fronius ==
- Dissertatio Metaphysica, de distinctione, Praeside Christ. Donati Kal. Nov. Vitebergae, 1681.
- Dissertatio de distinctione Totius et Partium, Respond. Joh. Hoch. Parathia Transsilvano. Kal. Nov. Vitebergae, 1682.
- Dissertatio de τριαδγνϖσια primorum N. T. Fidelium, ante publicum Christi Praeconium, Praes. Joh. Deutschmann. Vitebergae, 1682.
- Ugyanez Deutschmannnak Theosophia et Triadosophia, Witebergae, 1685.
- Eccur prae se ferat aliud, aliud animo destinet, Deus Optim. Max., Praeside M. Marco Fronio, Andreas Nekesch, Cibiniens. Transsilv. propugnabit, anno 1686. d. 3. Február Witebergae.
- Cum coelum levius sit, fitque gravissima terra... Witebergae, 1700.
- Tusculanae Heltesdendes Coronae. 1704. (Dissertationes de SS. Theologia, quibus Articulorum Fidei omnium connexio methodo scriptuaria e septem omnino S. Sc. Locis deducta, commonstratur, ventilatae, Praeside Marco Fronio).
- Von der zum Himmel führenden Heimlichen und verborgenen Weisheit wie sie uns Gott durch seine Propheten und Apostel hat wissen lassen. Psal. 51. 8. I. Cor. 2. 7. Kronstadt, 1704.
- Patriam Quaerens Exul Psyche. Kronstadt, 1705.
- Der Artikel Von der Busse, in etlichen Sermonen fürgestellet, aus denen Worten des Propheten Joëls 2. 12. 13. 14... Kronstadt, 1707.
- Ordinationspredigt, als Herr Simon Draud, Gymn. Cor. L. 1. zum Pfarrer in Roth-Bach ordiniret und installiret wurde. Im Jahre Christi, 1709. 12. Hornung. Kronstadt.
- Enchiridon, Der kleine Catechismus D. M. L. Kronstadt, 1709.
- Die heimliche und verborgene Weisheit Gottes, welche Gott verordnet hat für der Welt, zu unser Herrlichkeit. (I. Theil.) In sieben Sprüchen heiliger Schrifft entworffen. Seinen Kindern aber gezeiget, von M. F. P. C. Kronstadt, 1709.
- Sprüche, woraus die Glaubens Artikel, in schrifftmässiger Ordnung, nach Einleitung derer sieben Grund-Sprüche, welche unterm Namen der Heimlichen und Verborgenen Weisheit Gottes, herausgegeben, sind abgehalten worden. Kronstadt, 1710.
- Die von unserm Herrn Jesu allen denen zu Ihm Kommenden und Beladenen versprochene Ruhe der Seelen, in einer Fest-Andacht betrachtet, zu Cronstadt 1711. Jahrs August Monat. Kronstadt.
- Ordinations. Predigt, als 1711. Jahres, den Pfingst-Montag zum heiligen Ammt, die Heerde Christi in Clausenburg zu weiden, die Hände auffgelegt werden. (Tit.) Hn. Georgen Marci, der H. Schrifit befliessenen, etc. geschehen in Cron-Stadt. Kronstadt, 1711.
- Ists auch recht? Bei dem betrübten Falle eines Eigenmordes abgehändelt Am Sonntage Trinit. über das ordentliche Evangelium, von M. F. C. D. Kronstadt, 1712.
- M. Marcus Fronius Visitationsbüchlein. Ein Beitrag zur Kirchen- und Sittengeschichte des Burzenlandes. Kronstadt, 1868.
