= Cristian, Brașov =

Cristian Neustadt (German)
- Commune
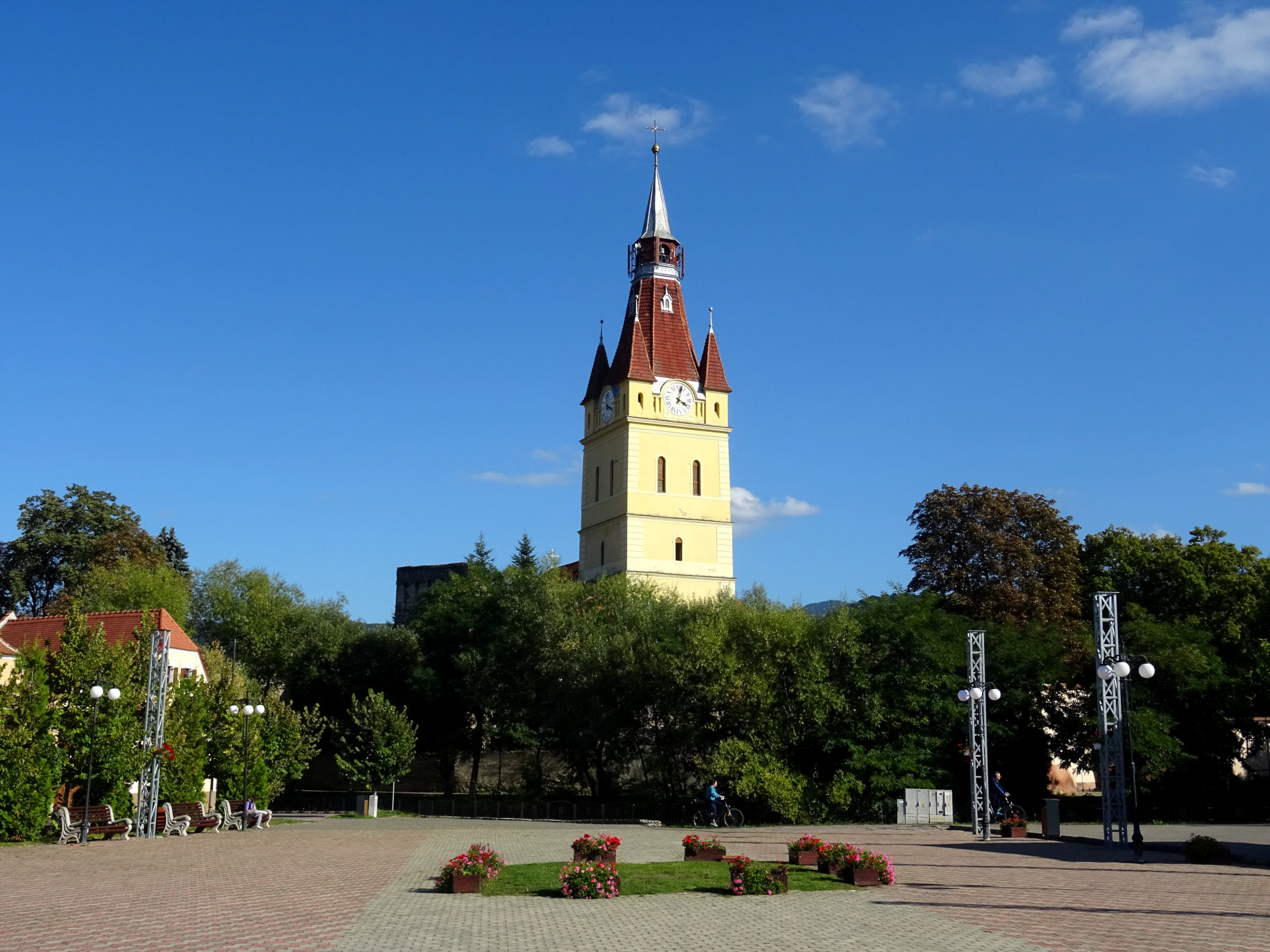
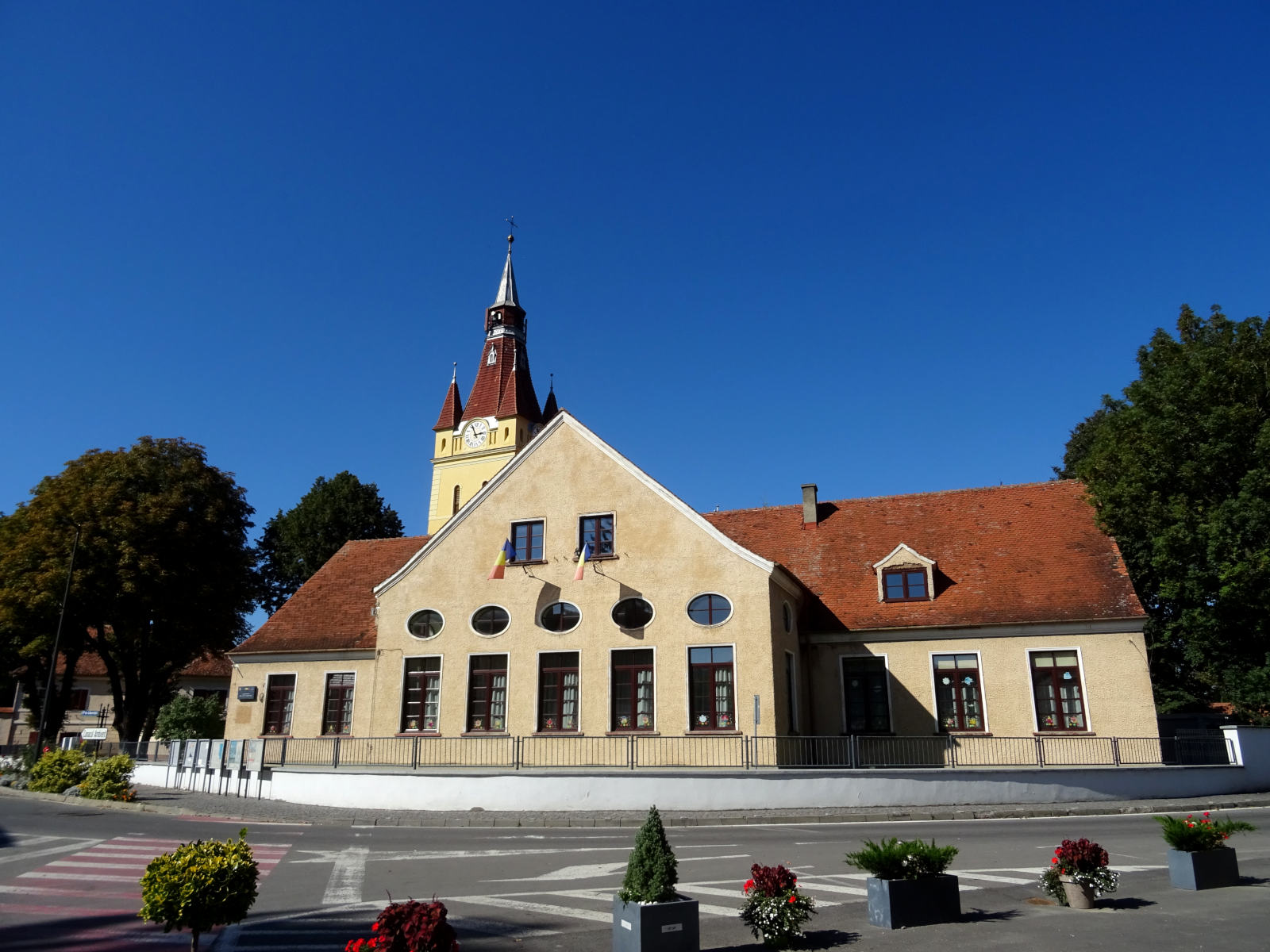
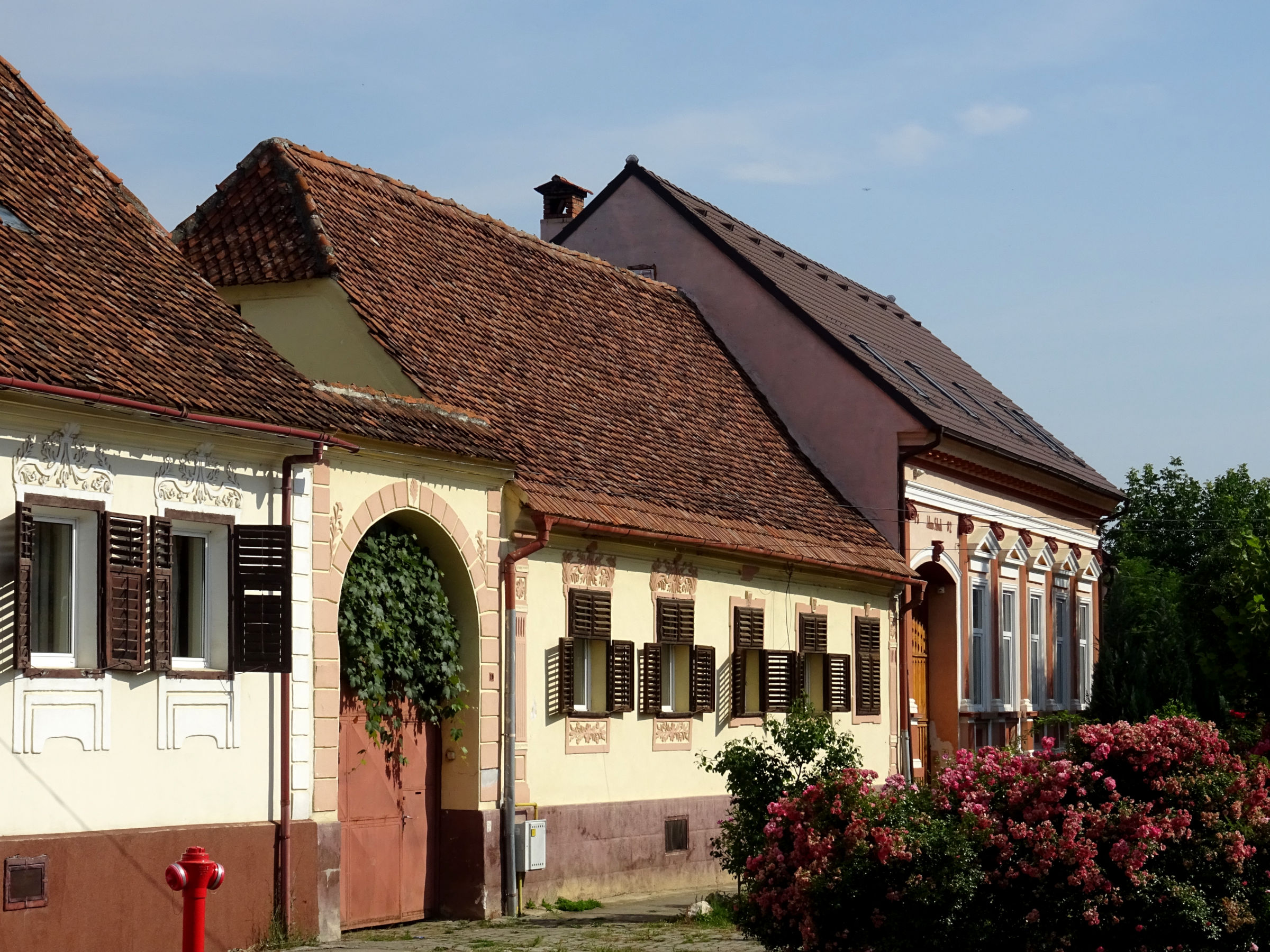
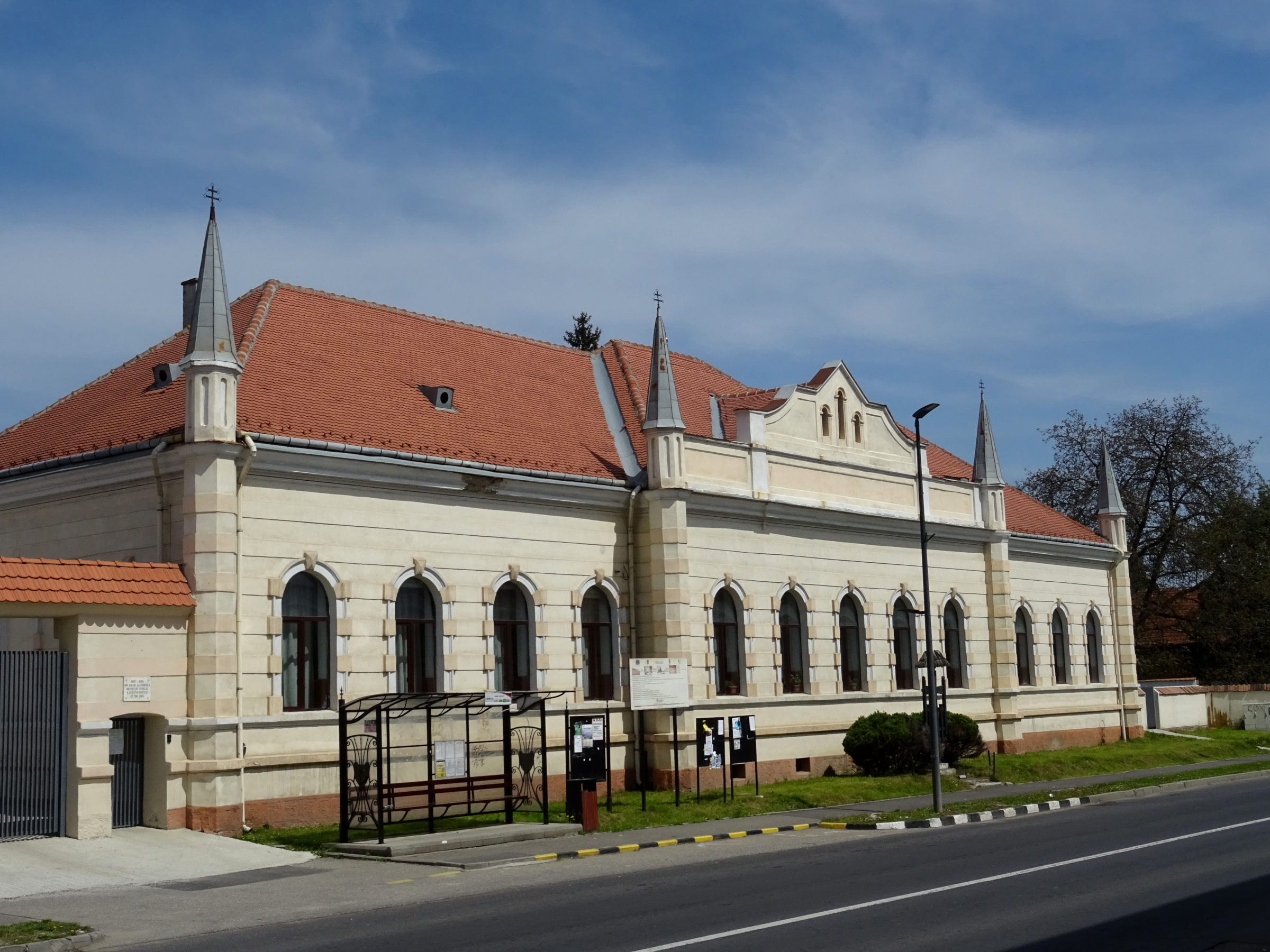
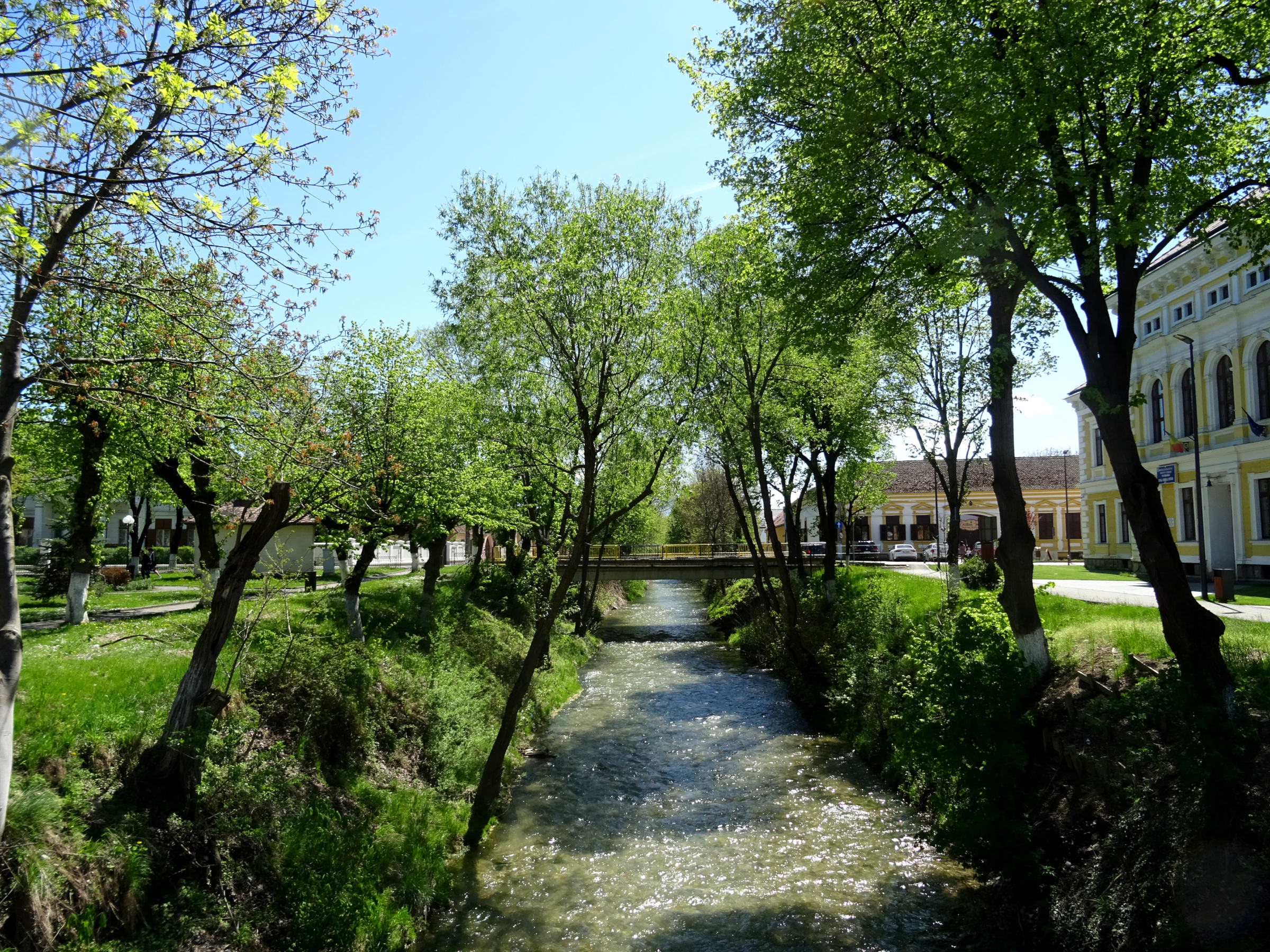
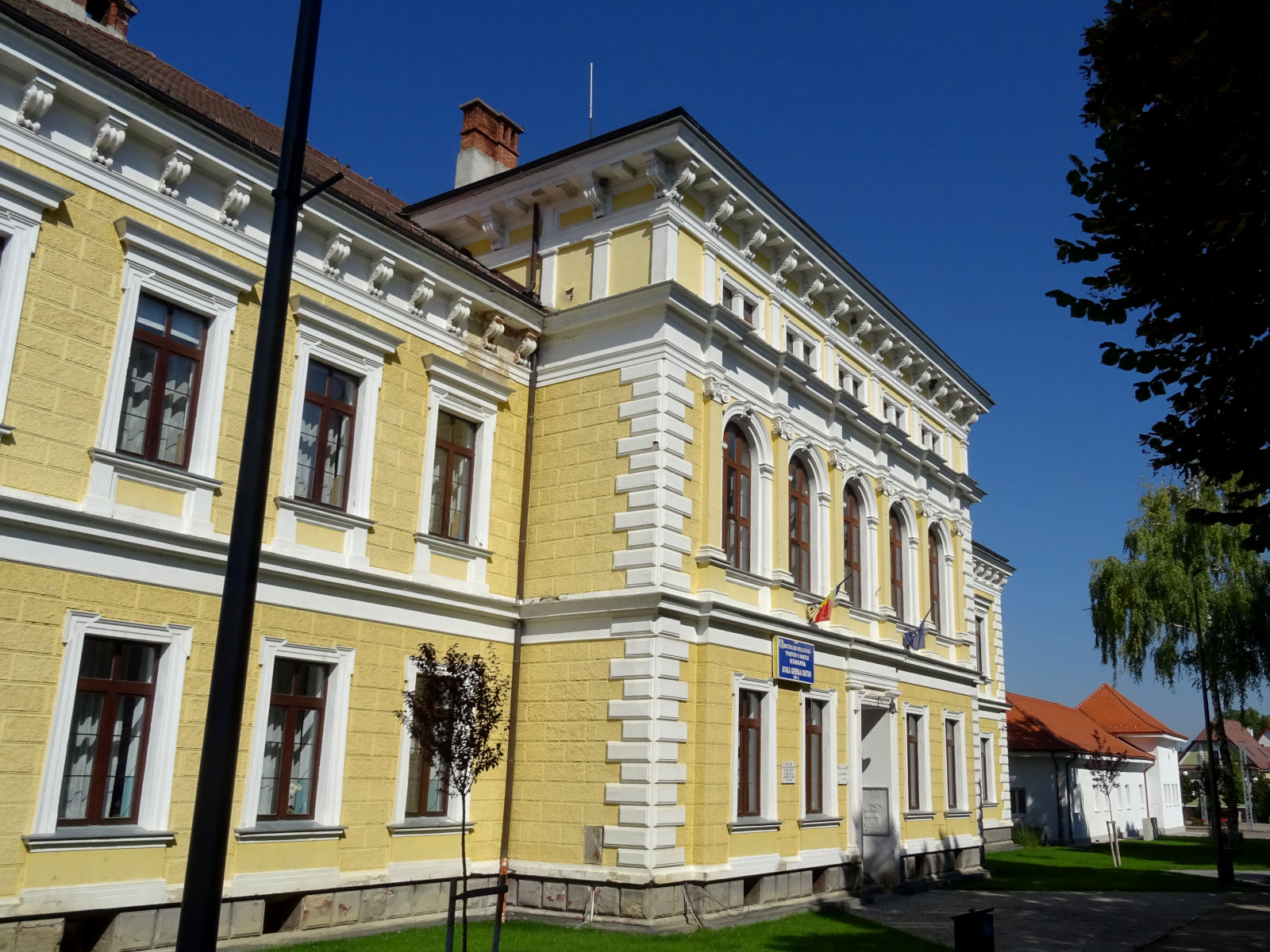
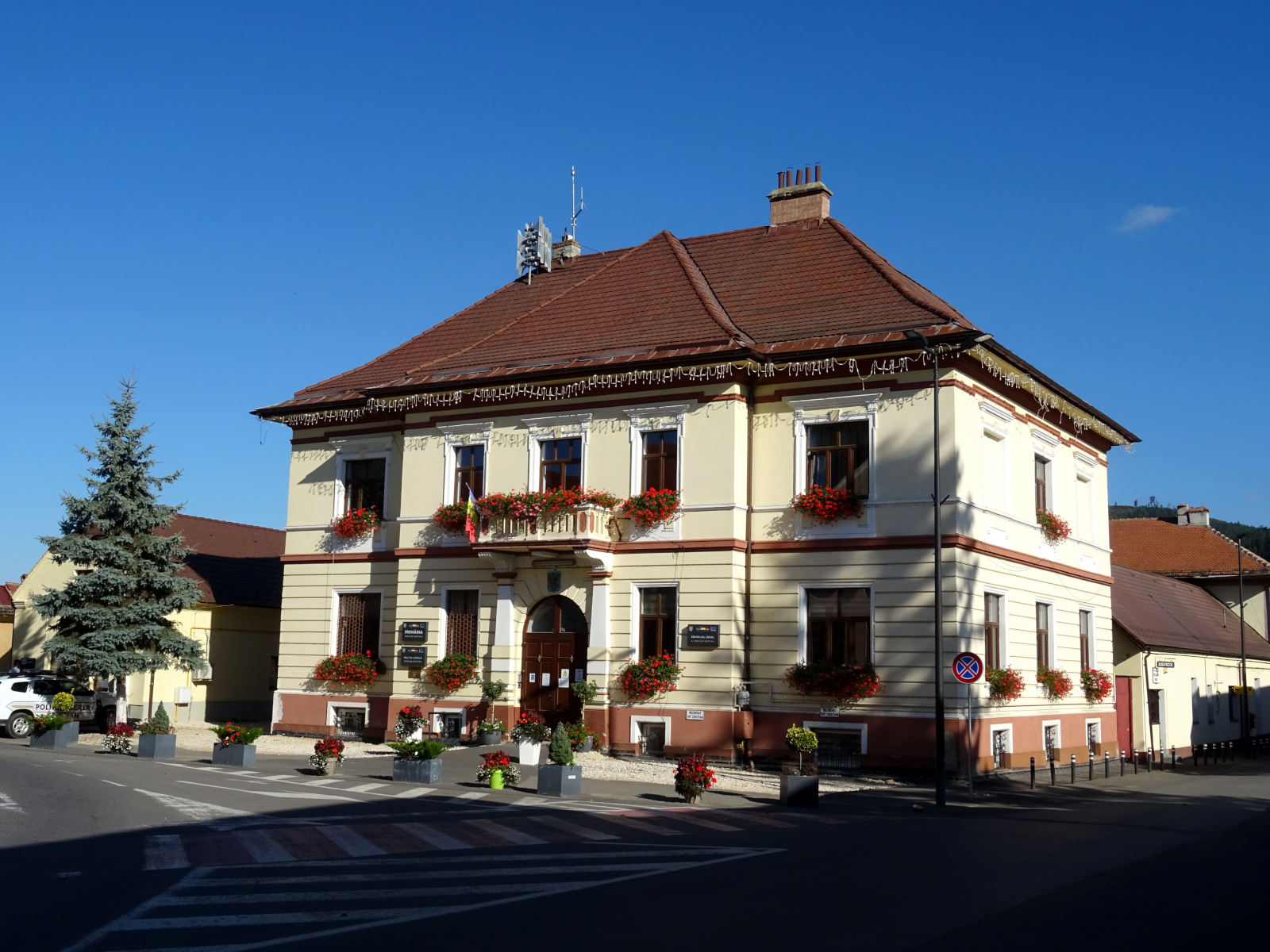
- Main Square of Cristian Kindergarten in Cristian Street in Cristian Old Romanian School Ghimbășel River Former Lutheran School Cristian Town Hall Views of Cristian

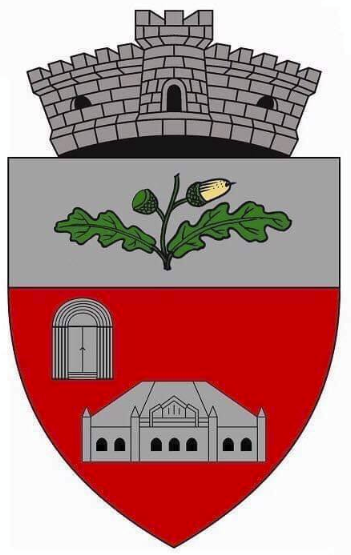
- Coat of arms

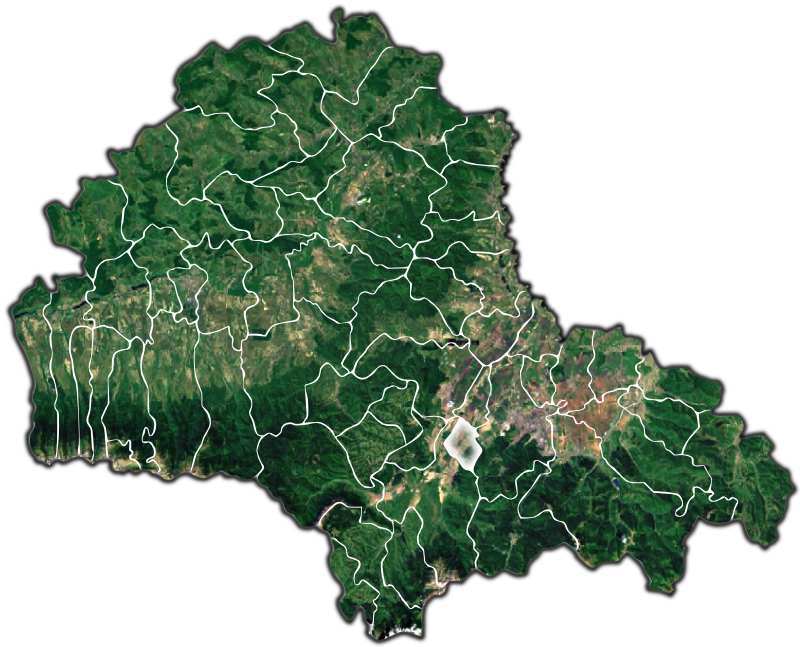
- Location within the county

- Location in Romania
- Coordinates: 45.6333°N 25.4833°E
- Country: Romania
- County: Brașov

Government
  - Mayor (2020–2024): Gicu Cojocaru (PNL)
- Area: 27.73 km^{2} (10.71 sq mi)
- Elevation: 595 m (1,952 ft)
- Population (2021-12-01): 6,292
  - Density: 226.9/km^{2} (587.7/sq mi)
- Time zone: UTC+02:00 (EET)
  - Summer (DST): UTC+03:00 (EEST)
- Postal code: 507055
- Area code: (+40) 02 68
- Vehicle reg.: BV
- Website: primariacristian.ro

Cristian (German: Neustadt; Hungarian: Keresztényfalva) is a commune in Brașov County, Transylvania, Romania. It is composed of a single village, Cristian.

== Geography ==
The commune is located some 12 km (7.5 mi) west of Brașov, in the Burzenland region of southeastern Transylvania. It is traversed south to north by the Ghimbășel river.

== Demographics ==
Historical population
Year	Pop.	±%
1838	2,325	—
1875	2,308	−0.7%
1890	2,604	+12.8%
1930	2,873	+10.3%
1992	3,764	+31.0%
2002	3,924	+4.3%
2011	4,490	+14.4%
2021	6,292	+40.1%
Source: Census data

At the 2002 census, Cristian had 3,924 inhabitants; of those, 95.3% were Romanians, 2.9% Transylvanian Saxons, and 1.8% Hungarians. 93.1% were Romanian Orthodox, 2.6% Lutheran, 1.7% Christian Evangelical, 0.8% Reformed, and 0.5% Roman Catholic. At the 2011 census, the population had increased to 4,490, of which 91.63% were Romanians, 1.92% Transylvanian Saxons, and 1.71% Hungarians. At the 2021 census, the population had reached 6,292; of those, 84.85% were Romanians and 1.29% Hungarians.

== Natives ==
- Emil Dima (born 1997), racing cyclist
- Marcus Fronius (1659 – 1713), Lutheran theologian, pedagogue, and author
- Hans Hermannstädter (1918 – 2006), field handball player
