= Fronius International =

Austrian company

Fronius International GmbH
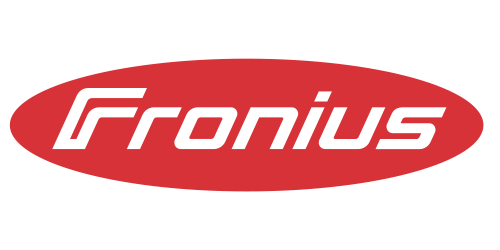
- Type: Limited liability company (Gesellschaft mit beschränkter Haftung)
- Founded: 1945
- Founder: Günter Fronius
- Headquarters: Pettenbach, Upper Austria, Austria
- Key people: Elisabeth Engelbrechtsmüller-Strauß (CEO / CFO); Franz Lattner (COO); Harald Langeder (CTO); Volker Lenzeder (CIO); Harald Scherleitner (CSO)
- Number of employees: 6,500 (2025)
- Website: www.fronius.com

Fronius International GmbH is an Austrian company based in Pettenbach, Upper Austria. Fronius is active in the fields of welding technology, photovoltaics and battery charging technology.

== History ==
=== Formation and development ===
In 1945, Günter Fronius (1907-2015) set up Fronius International GmbH in Pettenbach. Günter Fronius occupied himself with the development of battery charging systems in an electrical business. Based on the same technology, he expanded his product portfolio in 1950 to include welding equipment. In the mid-1960s, the company started to manufacture electronics and welding torches. In 1972, Fronius opened a second site in Thalheim, near Wels, and moved production there. Günter Fronius handed over the management of the business to his two children in 1980, and from then on the company focused more and more on expansion and internationalisation. Sites were opened in Austria and beyond in the years that followed. Today, Fronius has 36 international subsidiaries. At the same time, Fronius expanded into the fields of welding technology and battery charging technology. Photovoltaics became a new focus in 1992. The logistics and production site at Sattledt was opened in 2007. Since 2012, the company has been managed by Elisabeth Engelbrechtsmüller-Strauß, Günter Fronius' granddaughter. Since April 2022, Fronius has held a stake in go-e GmbH, an Austrian manufacturer of charging infrastructure. The partnership is intended, in particular, to capitalize on market growth in the wallbox segment and to promote the use of solar energy for mobility purposes. As of 2026, Fronius holds 1,834 patents.

Due to declining demand, there were two waves of layoffs in 2024, affecting a total of 1,000 employees. By the end of 2025, Fronius employed approximately 6,500 people worldwide.

== Business units ==
In 2025, Fronius merged the sales and marketing strategies of its three former business units Solar Energy (photovoltaics), Perfect Welding (welding technology), and Perfect Charging (battery charging technology). The company cited the elimination of duplication as the reason for this move. Fronius is now divided into the business segments Solar & Energy and Welding. Solar & Energy covers solar solutions and battery charging technology, while Welding focuses on welding technology.

=== Welding ===
The business area provides products and complete systems - both manual and automated as well as services in welding technology. Around 1950, Fronius launched its first welding transformer with magnet-yoke-control, which allowed the welding current to be continuously adjusted. In 2005 the company launched the CMT (cold metal transfer) process, which permits the thermal joining of steel to aluminium. The introduction of the DeltaSpot welding system (resistance spot welding system) finally facilitated the mass production of aluminium car bodies.

=== Solar Energy ===
Fronius has been involved in photovoltaics since 1992 and develops and produces high-performance inverters for grid connected photovoltaic systems from 1 kW upwards. The product portfolio also includes energy storage and backup power solutions, as well as e-mobility and heating solutions. The product range is complemented by components for system monitoring, data visualisation and analysis - all available as standalone product add-ons.

=== Charging ===
This is the oldest business area of Fronius International. Fronius has been researching and developing charging technology since it was founded in 1945. The company offers the right charging solutions for users and manufacturers of industrial trucks and automated guided vehicles (AGVs). Its product portfolio includes innovative chargers for lead-acid and lithium-ion batteries, as well as intelligent automation and software solutions.

== Sites ==
=== Austria ===
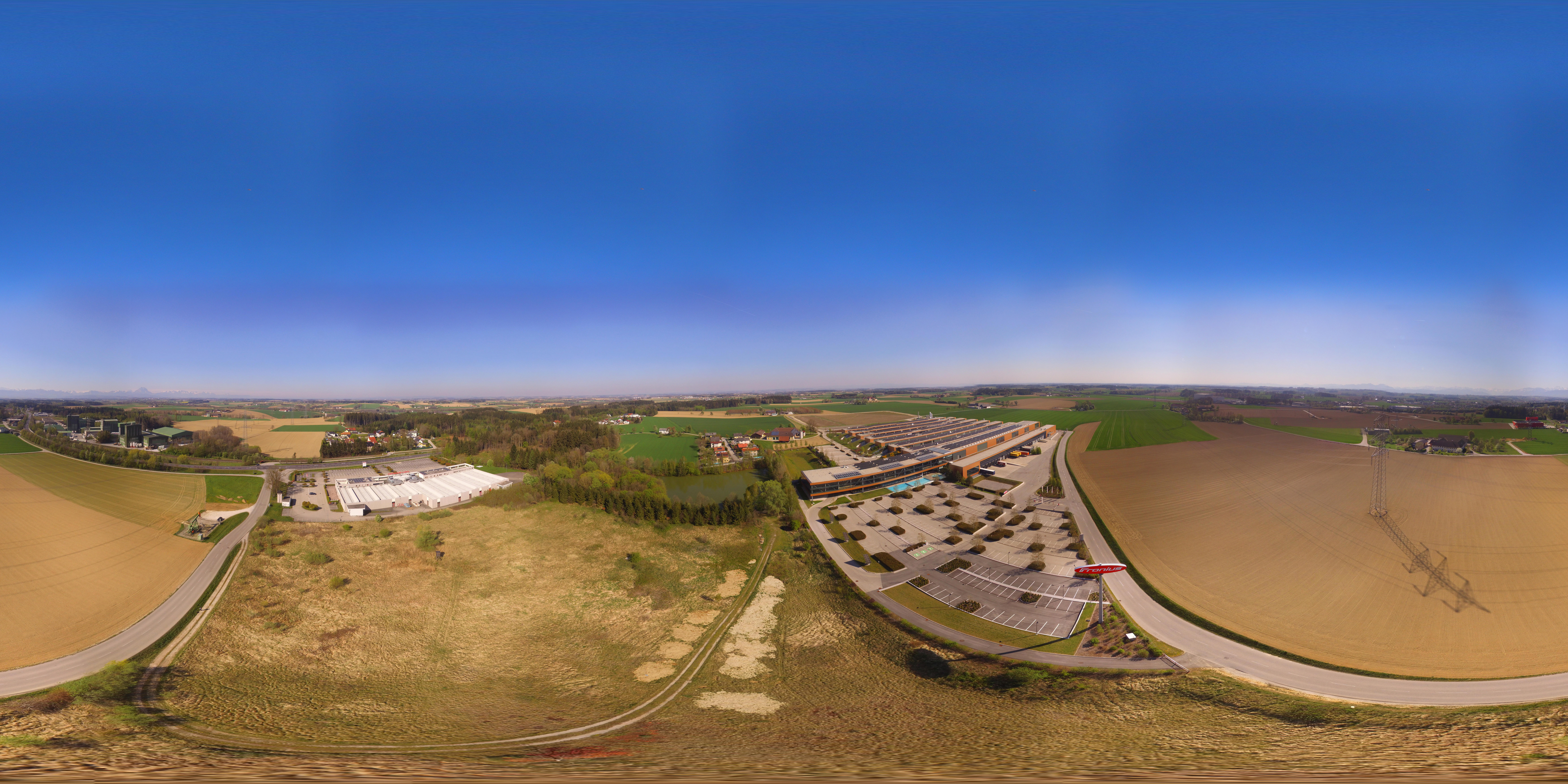
360° airborne panorama of site Sattledt (view as a 360° interactive panorama)

Fronius is based in Pettenbach, where the company was founded. This is the "centre of excellence" for Fronius welding torches and accounting & internal auditing.

The production and logistics site of the company is located in Sattledt. Since 2007, all battery charging systems, welding systems and solar inverters have been produced here. One of the largest photovoltaic systems in Austria, with a capacity of around two megawatts peak can be found on the roof of the building. Two ice storage systems are used for heating and cooling.

Thalheim, near Wels, is the research and development site of the company. Special features of the Thalheim site include photovoltaic electricity generation, geothermal probes (geothermal fields) and the systematic re-use of waste heat from the test laboratories.

Wels, with its historic brick building, is the sales hub of Fronius International. The site, which was opened in 1990, extends over 17,000 m^{2} and is the starting point for the international activities of all Fronius divisions. The active energy design, photovoltaics system and modern environmental technology ensure that as much energy as possible is collected to meet its own requirements.

The Repair Center International (RCI), which used to be in Sattledt, relocated to Steinhaus in 2010.

=== International sites ===
In addition to the sites in Austria, Fronius has 36 international subsidiaries and sales partners/representatives in more than 60 countries (as of 2025).
