= Franz Friedrich Fronius =

Romanian botanist (1829–1886)

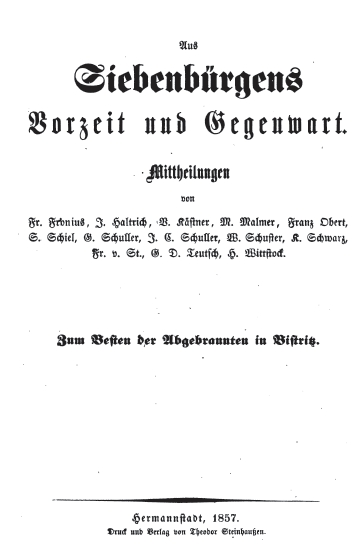
Title Page of Aus Siebenbürgens Vorzeit und Gegenwart (1857)

Franz Friedrich Fronius (9 January 1829 - 14 February 1886) was a Transylvanian-Saxon botanist, ethnologist, and Lutheran cleric from Schäßburg.

Fronius was born on 9 January 1829, in Nadesch (now Nadeş). He authored over thirty books, including, Flora von Schäßburg, ein Beitrag zur Flora von Siebenbürgen (English: Flora of Schäßburg, a Contribution to the Flora of Siebenbürgen), and Aus Siebenbürgens Vorzeit und Gegenwart: Mittheilungen (English: "Releases: Transylvania, from Antiquity to Present"). He also co-authored many other works.

Fronius died on 14 February 1886, in Agnetheln (now Agnita).
