= Conrad Haas =

Austrian military engineer

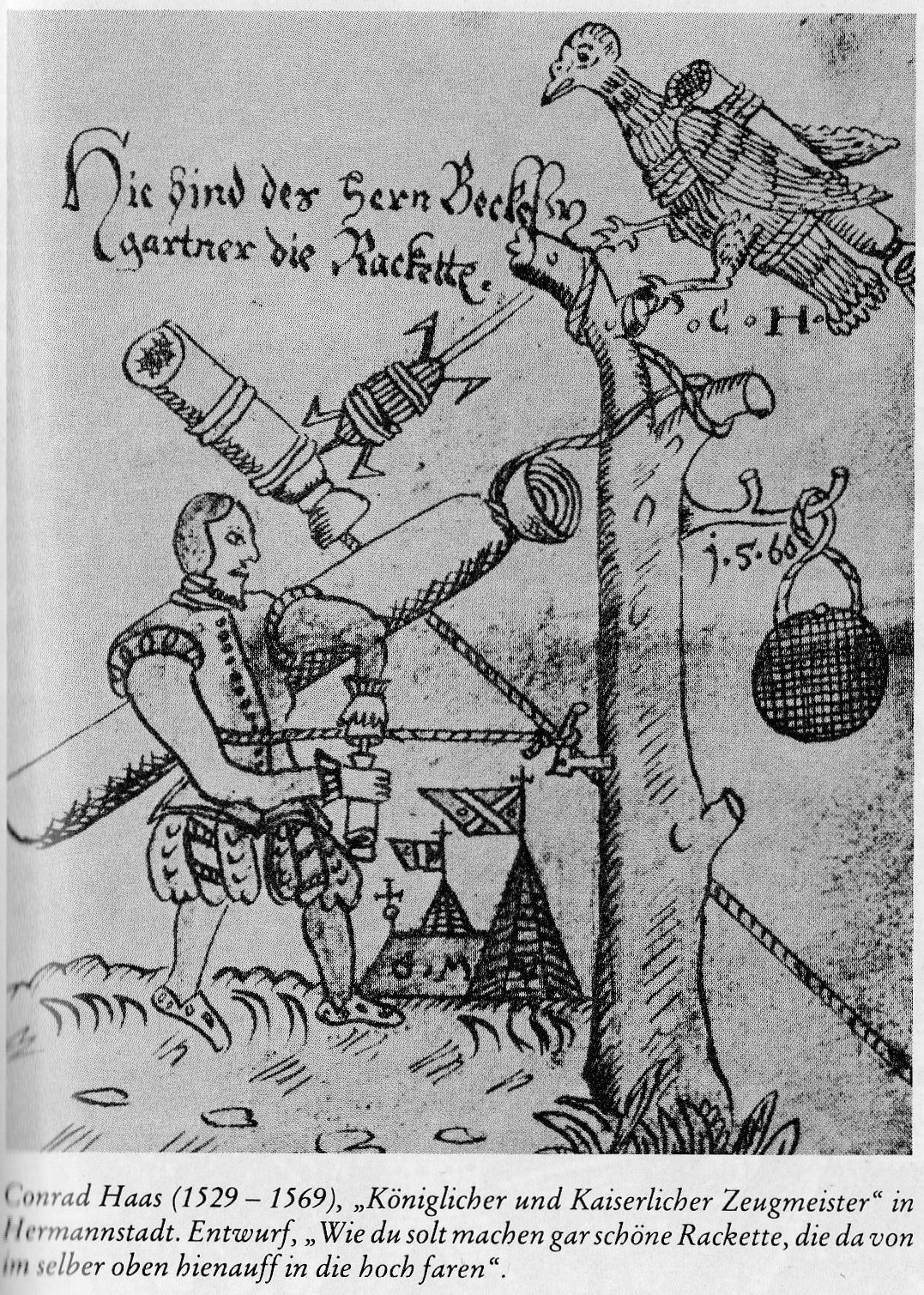
Description of a rocket by Conrad Haas

Conrad Haas (1509–1576) was an Austrian or Transylvanian Saxon military engineer. He was a pioneer of rocket propulsion. His designs include a three-stage rocket and a manned rocket.

Haas was possibly born in Dornbach, now a suburb of Vienna. He held the post of Zeugwart (arsenal master) of the Imperial Habsburg army under Ferdinand I. In 1551, Stephen Báthory, the grand prince of Transylvania, invited Haas to Hermannstadt (now Sibiu, Romania), where he acted as weapons engineer. He also started to teach at Klausenburg (now Cluj-Napoca).

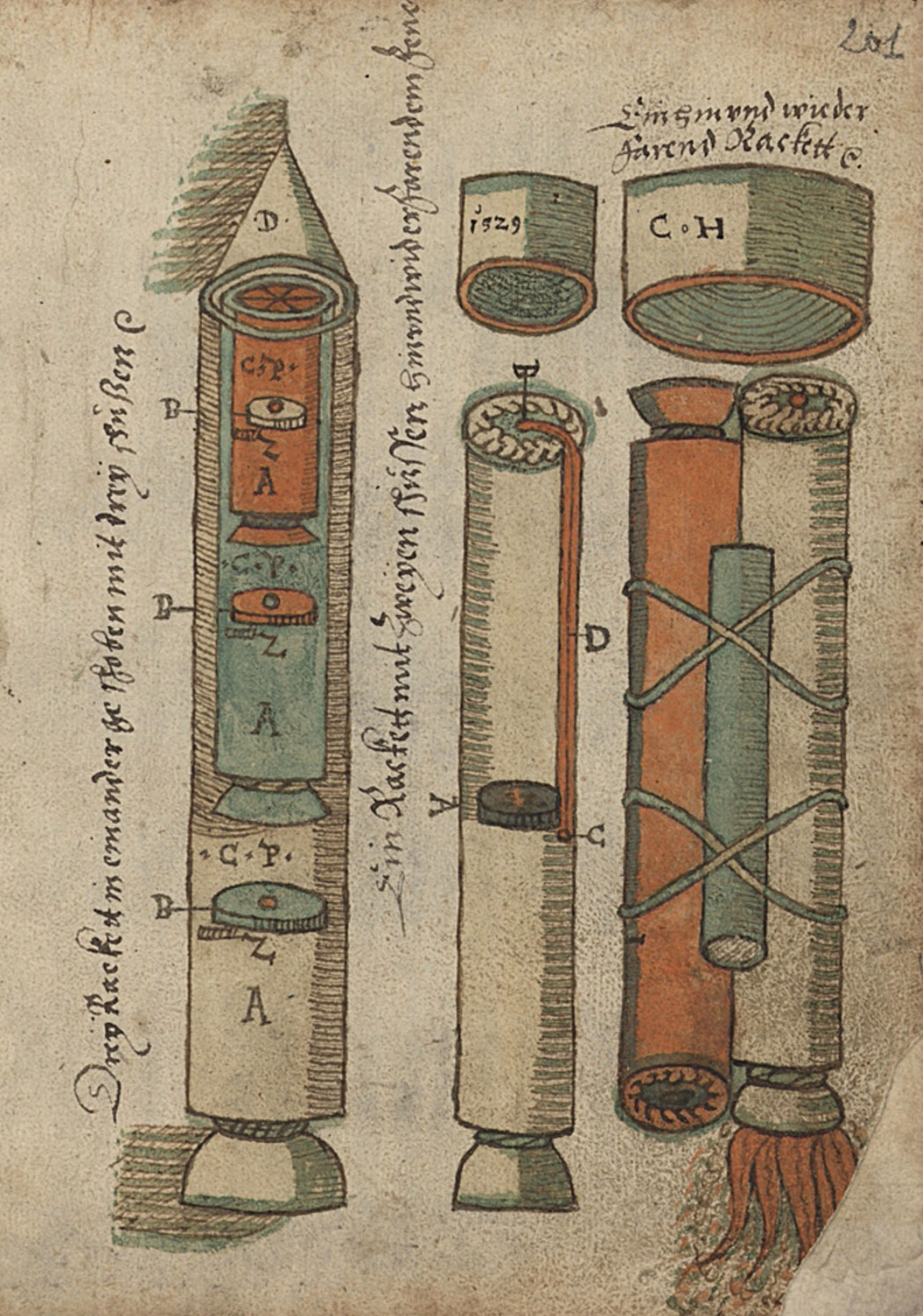
Multi-stage rocket designed by Haas

He wrote a German-language treatise on rocket technology, involving the combination of fireworks and weapons technologies. This manuscript was discovered in 1961, in the Sibiu public records (Sibiu public records Varia II 374). His work also dealt with the theory of motion of multi-stage rockets, different fuel mixtures using liquid fuel, and introduced delta-shaped fins and bell-shaped nozzles.

In the last paragraph of his chapter on the military use of rockets, he wrote (translated):

But my advice is for more peace and no war, leaving the rifles calmly in storage, so the bullet is not fired, the gunpowder is not burned or wet, so the prince keeps his money, the arsenal master his life; that is the advice Conrad Haas gives.

Johann Schmidlap, a German fireworks maker, is believed to have experimented with staging in 1590, using a design he called "step rockets". Before the discovery of Haas's manuscript, the first description of the three-stage rocket was credited to the artillery specialist Casimir Siemienowicz, from the Polish–Lithuanian Commonwealth, in his 1650 work Artis Magnae Artilleriae Pars Prima ("Great Art of Artillery, Part One").
