= Kazimierz Siemienowicz =

17th-century general, gunsmith, and military engineer

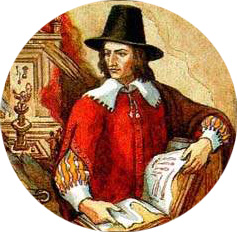
Kazimierz Siemienowicz. Modern artist impression from a Belarusian stamp.

Kazimierz Siemienowicz (Latin: Casimirus Siemienowicz, Lithuanian: Kazimieras Simonavičius; born c. 1600 – c. 1651) was a Polish–Lithuanian general of artillery, gunsmith, military engineer, and one of pioneers of rocketry. Born in the Raseiniai region of the Grand Duchy of Lithuania, he served in the armies of the Polish–Lithuanian Commonwealth and of Frederick Henry, Prince of Orange, the ruler of the Dutch Republic. No portrait or detailed biography of him has survived and much of his life is a subject of dispute.

After contributing his expertise to several battles, Siemienowicz published Artis Magnae Artilleriae in 1650. This treatise, which discusses rocketry and pyrotechnics, remained a standard work in those fields for two centuries.

== Early life ==
Siemienowicz coat of arms, Ostoja

=== Polish school ===
The Polish school describes his identity simply as member of the szlachta (i.e., nobility in the Commonwealth) from Grand Duchy. Some sources use the term "Polish," others describe him as "Lithuanian". Those terms should be understood in proper context: "Polish" means "of the Polish–Lithuanian Commonwealth"; "Lithuanian" from the Grand Duchy of Lithuania, a federal part of the Commonwealth. Polish historian professor Tadeusz Marian Nowak described Siemienowicz as a Polonized Lithuanian nobleman. Polish historians acknowledge that he used the Ostoja Coat of Arms and that he was an alumnus of the Academy of Vilnius.

=== Lithuanian school ===
Lithuanian literature asserts that he was Lithuanian. He was born near Raseiniai in Samogitia. The family, who was relatively poor, bore the Ostoja Coat of Arms with military service traditions in the Grand Duchy. Siemenowicz was educated in the Academy of Vilnius.

=== Belarusian school ===
The Belarusian school asserts that he was born in the vicinity of Dubrowna in the Viciebsk land, to a family of minor Ruthenian princes (knyaz) of Siemienowicz, who possessed the small tracts of land in that part of the Belarusian Dnieper-land (Падняпроўе) in the 14th–17th centuries. Some examples of lexicography used by K. Siemienowicz support this interpretation.

There are no records of families with the surname Siemienowicz having the right to bear the Ostoja coat of arms and it is possible that Siemienowicz acquired the right to use the image of Ostoja in his book to facilitate its circulation.

== Military career ==
As Siemienowicz wrote, he was fascinated by artillery since childhood, and he studied many sciences to increase his knowledge (mathematics, mechanics, hydraulics, architecture, optics, tactics). In 1632–1634 he took part in the Smolensk War, in the Siege of Belaya under Mikołaj Abramowicz (who in 1640 became the first Lithuanian General of Artillery). It is possible that in 1644 he took part in the Battle of Ochmatów.

He spent some time in the Netherlands, where he was sent by the King Władysław IV Vasa to serve in the army of Duke Frederick Henry of Orange during the war with Spain; he participated in the Siege of Hulst in 1645. In 1646 he returned to Poland when Władysław created the Polish artillery corps and gathered specialists from Europe, planning a war with Ottoman Empire. He served as an engineering expert in the fields of artillery and rocketry in the royal artillery forces. From 1648 he served as Second in Command of the Polish Royal Artillery.

In late 1648 the newly elected king John II Casimir Vasa, who had no plans for the war with Ottomans, advised him to return to the Netherlands and publish his studies there. There are rumors that in 1649 Siemienowicz became embroiled in a conflict with General of the Artillery Krzysztof Arciszewski over a bureaucratic matter; around 1649 he decided to leave the Commonwealth and work on his book in Amsterdam.

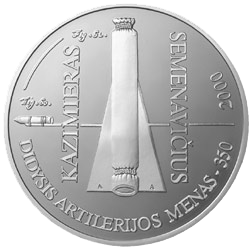
Fifty Litas commemorative coin dedicated to the 350th anniversary of Artis Magnae Artilleriae

=== Stance on poison gas ===
Siemienowicz considered the use of poison gases dishonorable. In his work, he wrote:

"and most of all, they shall not construct any poisoned globes, nor other sorts of pyrobolic inventions, in which he shall introduce no poison whatsoever, besides which, they shall never employ them for the ruin and destruction of men, because the first inventors of our art thought such actions as unjust among themselves as unworthy of a man of heart and a real soldier."

=== Use of biowarfare ===
In a historically early instance of biowarfare, Siemienowicz sponsored the firing of artillery containing the saliva of rabid dogs during a 1650 battle. While the success of this experiment is unknown, it demonstrated an educated guess about the disease's communicability that was not confirmed until the 18th century. It was popular in ancient warfare to catapult a deadly disease by using an infected cadaver or its parts to the enemy. One of the most notable examples was Genghis Khan's war against besieged Chinese cities, where he catapulted dead bodies infected with plague into cities.

== Artis Magnae Artilleriae ==
Siemenowicz multi-stage rocket, from his Artis Magnae Artilleriae pars prima

In 1650 Siemienowicz published a notable work, Artis Magnae Artilleriae pars prima (Great Art of Artillery, the First Part). Its name implies a second part, and it is rumored that he wrote its manuscript before his death. It is also rumored that he was killed by members of the metallurgy/gunsmith/pyrotechnics guilds, who were opposed to him publishing a book about their secrets, and that they hid or destroyed the manuscript of the second part. Guilds aggressively protecting their production secrets was widespread in these times, as we can see from James Stirling having to flee Venice in 1725 for fear of being assassinated after finding out a trade secret of the glassmakers of Venice. Siemienowicz disparaged what he saw as a culture of secrecy based on "canting Alchymists of the times Past...they dealed in nothing but Smoke, yet arrogantly took upon them to be Professors of so noble and excellent an art as Chymistry."

Artis Magnae Artilleriae pars prima was first printed in Amsterdam in 1650, was translated to French in 1651, German in 1676, English and Dutch in 1729, and Polish in 1963.

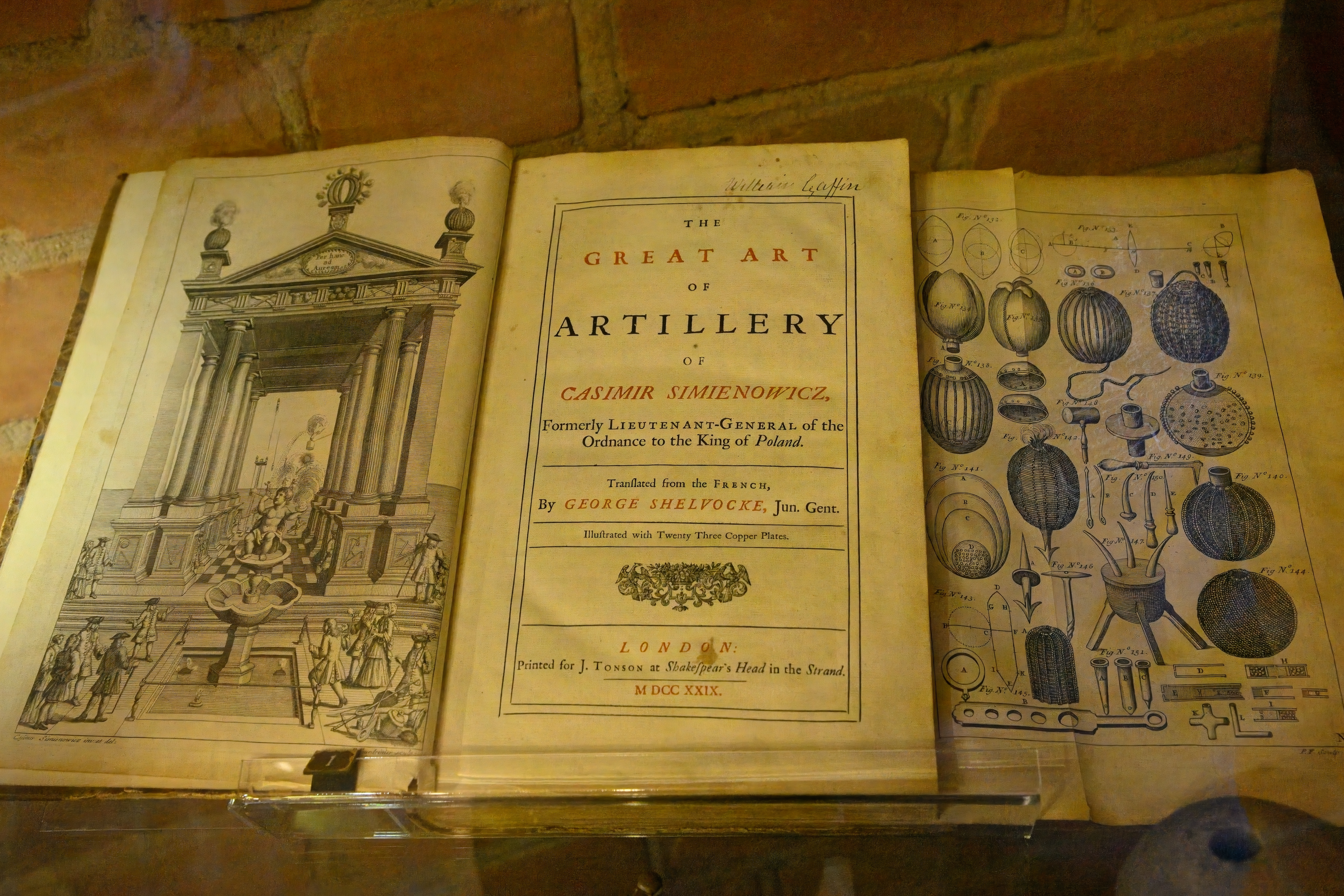
Copy of the book, published 1729 (MDCCXXIX) in London.

In the first part of his work he wrote that the second one would contain the "universal pyrotechnic invention, containing all of our current knowledge." According to his short description, this invention was supposed to greatly ease all measurements and calculations.

For over two centuries this work was used in Europe as a basic artillery manual / handbook. Its pyrotechnic formulations were used for over a century. The book provided the standard designs for creating rockets, fireballs, and other pyrotechnic devices. It discussed for the first time the idea of applying a reactive technique to artillery (rocket artillery). It contains a large chapter on caliber, construction, production and properties of rockets for both military and civil purposes, including multistage rockets, batteries of rockets, and rockets with delta wing stabilisers (instead of the common guiding rods). It was the first book in the world to systematically present knowledge about the development of multistage rockets and rocket artillery.

== See also ==
- Vannoccio Biringuccio (1480–1539), Italian author on metallurgy, gunpowder and glassware production etc.
- Conrad Haas (1509–1576), military engineer, wrote a treatise on rocket technology
- Johann Schmidlap, 16th-century Bavarian fireworks maker and rocket pioneer
- Benjamin Robins, 17th-century English artillery scientist

Benjamin Robins

- Leonhard Euler, 18th-century Swiss mathematician who amongst many other things laid the mathematical foundation for classical mechanics by rewriting and hugely extending the work of Benjamin Robins in Euler's seminal book on artillery commissioned by the Prussian King Frederick the Great "Neue Grundsätze der Artillerie"

https://www.eisenbibliothek.ch/de/ressources/recent-aquisitions/artillerie.html

Leonhard Euler

- Konstantin Tsiolkovsky (1857–1935), Russian and Soviet rocket scientist and pioneer of the astronautic theory
- Clan of Ostoja, group of knights and lords in late-medieval Central and Eastern Europe
- Ostoja Coat of Arms
