= Pettenbach =

- Municipality
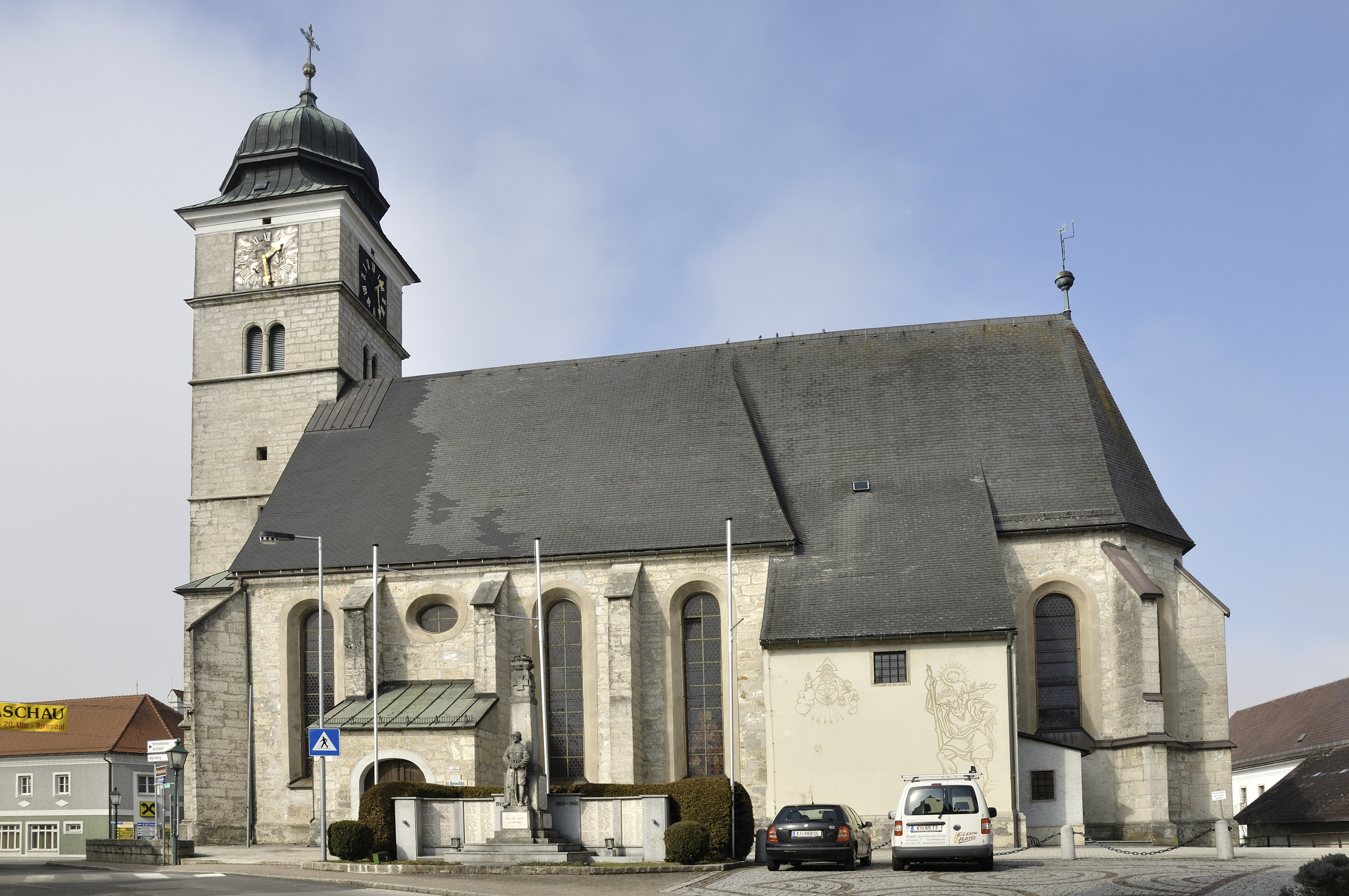
- Church of Saint Benedict

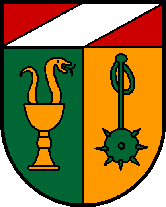
- Coat of arms

- Location within Austria
- Coordinates: 47°57′42″N 14°01′00″E
- Country: Austria
- State: Upper Austria
- District: Kirchdorf an der Krems

Government
  - Mayor: Leopold Bimminger (ÖVP)

Area
  - Total: 54.69 km^{2} (21.12 sq mi)
- Elevation: 486 m (1,594 ft)

Population (2018-01-01)
  - Total: 5,272
  - Density: 96.40/km^{2} (249.7/sq mi)
- Time zone: UTC+1 (CET)
  - Summer (DST): UTC+2 (CEST)
- Postal code: 4643
- Area code: 07586
- Vehicle registration: KI
- Website: www.pettenbach.at

Pettenbach is a municipality in the district of Kirchdorf an der Krems in the Austrian state of Upper Austria.

== Geography ==
Pettenbach lies in the Traunviertel. About 16 percent of the municipality is forest, and 74 percent is farmland.
