= Günter Fronius =

Günter Fronius (11 November 1907 – 21 July 2015) was an Austrian entrepreneur and the founder of Fronius International GmbH. He was born in Hermannstadt, Austria-Hungary (now Sibiu, Romania), and obtained his engineering degree from Breslau University of Technology in 1945.

A Transylvanian Saxon, Fronius holds the honorific professional title of Kommerzialrat for "long-standing Merit to the Republic of Austria". In 2007 he was presented with the Julius Raab Medal, the highest Austrian award for economics, by Dr. Josef Pühringer, Governor of Upper Austria, on the occasion of his 100th birthday.

Günter Fronius died in 2015, aged 107.
