= Hans Fronius =

Austrian painter and illustrator (1903–1988)

Hans Fronius (12 September 1903 - 21 March 1988) was an Austrian painter and illustrator.

He was born in Sarajevo, which was then a territory of Austria-Hungary (now Bosnia and Hercegovina). His father was descended from an old, aristocratic Transylvanian Saxon family [see Fronius]. As a young boy, he witnessed the assassination of Archduke Franz Ferdinand of Austria, an event that would later form the subject of his book, Attentat in Sarajevo (English: Assassination in Sarajevo).

After the First World War, Fronius's family moved to Graz in Austria. He studied at the Academy of Fine Arts in Vienna. From 1930 to 1960, he taught art and projective geometry at a grammar school in Fürstenfeld, Styria. His leftist sympathies put his teaching position in jeopardy after the Anschluss, and in 1943 he was drafted into the German army.

The art historian Otto Benesch called Fronius "the most significant Austrian illustrator since Alfred Kubin." His work is considered an example of 'Expressive Realism', with subjects that include portraits, street scenes, and literary interpretations. He was one of the first illustrators of the stories of Franz Kafka, and contributed illustrations to works by Edgar Allan Poe and Robert Louis Stevenson.

He remained a prolific artist until his death at age 84 in 1988.

== Decorations and awards ==
- 1966: Grand Austrian State Prize for Visual Arts
- 1968: Medal of the Austrian capital Vienna
- Austrian Cross of Honour for Science and Art, 1st class
- Grand Gold Decoration of the province of Lower Austria
- Grand Gold Decoration of Styria
- 1981: Gutenberg Prize of the City of Leipzig
- 1983: Lovis Corinth Prize
