= Sigrid Fronius =

German journalist and writer (born 1942)

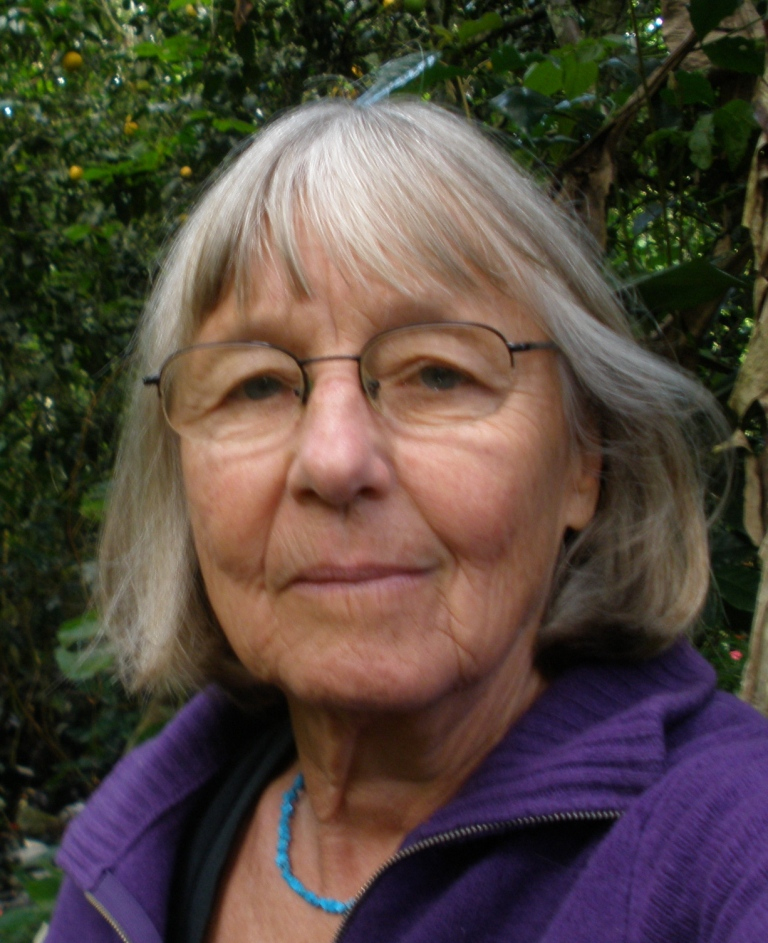
- Born: 23 January 1942 (age 84); Brașov
- Employer: Free University of Berlin

Sigrid Fronius (born 23 January 1942) is a German author, journalist and feminist. She was 1968 the first female chairwoman of the Allgemeinen Studierendenausschuss (AStA) at Free University of Berlin and was involved in South America during the political upheavals of the 1970s.

== Life ==
=== Childhood and youth ===
Sigrid Fronius was born in 1942 in Brașov (Kronstadt), Romania, the youngest of four sisters. Her father was the owner of a factory. After World War II, Romania got a Communist regime and, as a result of nationalization, the former owner became the salaried director of the same factory. Her mother was a housewife. In 1955 – despite the Iron Curtain – the family was allowed to leave Romania legally. They moved in with relatives in Austria. From 1957, Fronius lived near Stuttgart and graduated from high school in the spring of 1962.

=== Studies and student movement ===
From fall 1962, Fronius studied history and French at the Free University of Berlin. From 1963, she took part in working groups of the Argument Club, whose members included Wolfgang Fritz Haug, Wolfgang Lefevre and Jürgen Werth. They wrote articles on fascism and sexuality, read and discussed texts by Max Horkheimer and Hannah Arendt, reviewed books and published in the journal Das Argument. In 1965, Fronius joined the Sozialistischer Deutscher Studentenbund (SDS), ran for a seat in the Students' Parliament, was elected and in 1966 was appointed university officer of the AStA. Together with other women, such as Sigrun Anselm and Ursel Henning, she was an important part of university politics. She provided information on topics such as emergency legislation. In 1967, the student Benno Ohnesorg was shot dead by a police officer during the demonstration against the Shah of Persia. To counter the false reports in the press, the AStA supported the work of those students who took issue with the media coverage. Study-oriented working groups were formed at the faculties, which – with the active participation of Fronius – led to the founding of the Critical University. On 9 May 1968, Fronius was elected the first female AStA chairwoman at the FU Berlin with 32 out of 60 valid votes. During her term of office, she led protest actions, such as the occupations of the rectorate. In October 1968, she resigned from her position in the AStA.

=== Trade union and politics ===
At the invitation of IG Metall and Chemie, Fronius gave lectures on the ideas, goals and forms of struggle of the Studentenbewegung. In 1969, she worked at Robert Bosch GmbH and Siemens as a sample inspector. As part of a conference in the Harz Mountains, she wrote the Harz Paper, which addressed experiences gained while working in the factory. At the end of 1971, she and others founded the Proletarian Left / Party Initiative (PL/PI). Over time, the men increasingly spoke of their claim to leadership, which eventually prompted Fronius to separate from the group and return to her studies. She continued her studies at the Pädagogische Hochschule, as she wanted to teach at a Hauptschule. When there were no vacancies for Referendariat after graduation, Fronius decided to go to the Third World.
