= Matthias Fronius =

Lutheran cleric and Stadtrichter in Kronstadt

Matthias Fronius (28 February 1522 – 1588) was a Lutheran cleric and Stadtrichter (English: city magistrate) in Kronstadt, Siebenbürgen, where he was born and died. He was the author of Statuta Jurivm Municipalium Saxonum inn Transylvania, a 16th-century codification of Transylvanian law that incorporated legal principles established by both Roman and Anglo-Saxon law.

In his work, of which another version was published in German language (Der Sachsen inn Siebenbürgen: Statuta Oder eigen Landtrecht) in 1583, delineated real estate entitlements for the Transylvanian Saxons, whose autonomy within the Kingdom of Hungary was guaranteed under the Diploma Andreanum.

Fronius studied Theology at University of Wittenberg under Martin Luther and Philipp Melanchthon, obtaining his degree in 1543.

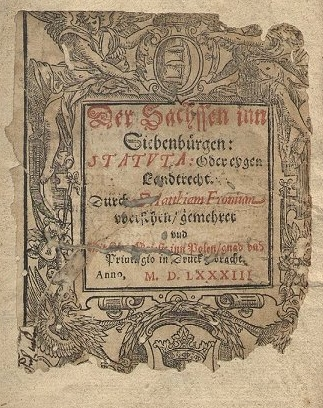
Title page of Der Sachssen inn Siebenbürgen (1583) by Matthias Fronius

== Works by Matthias Fronius ==
- Statuta Jurium Municipalium Saxonum inn Transylvania. Opera Matthiae Fronii. 1583. Corona.
- Der Sachsen inn Siebenbürgen: Statuta Oder eigen Landtrecht. Durch Matthiam Fronium. 1583. Hermannstadt.
