= History of rockets =

First rockets

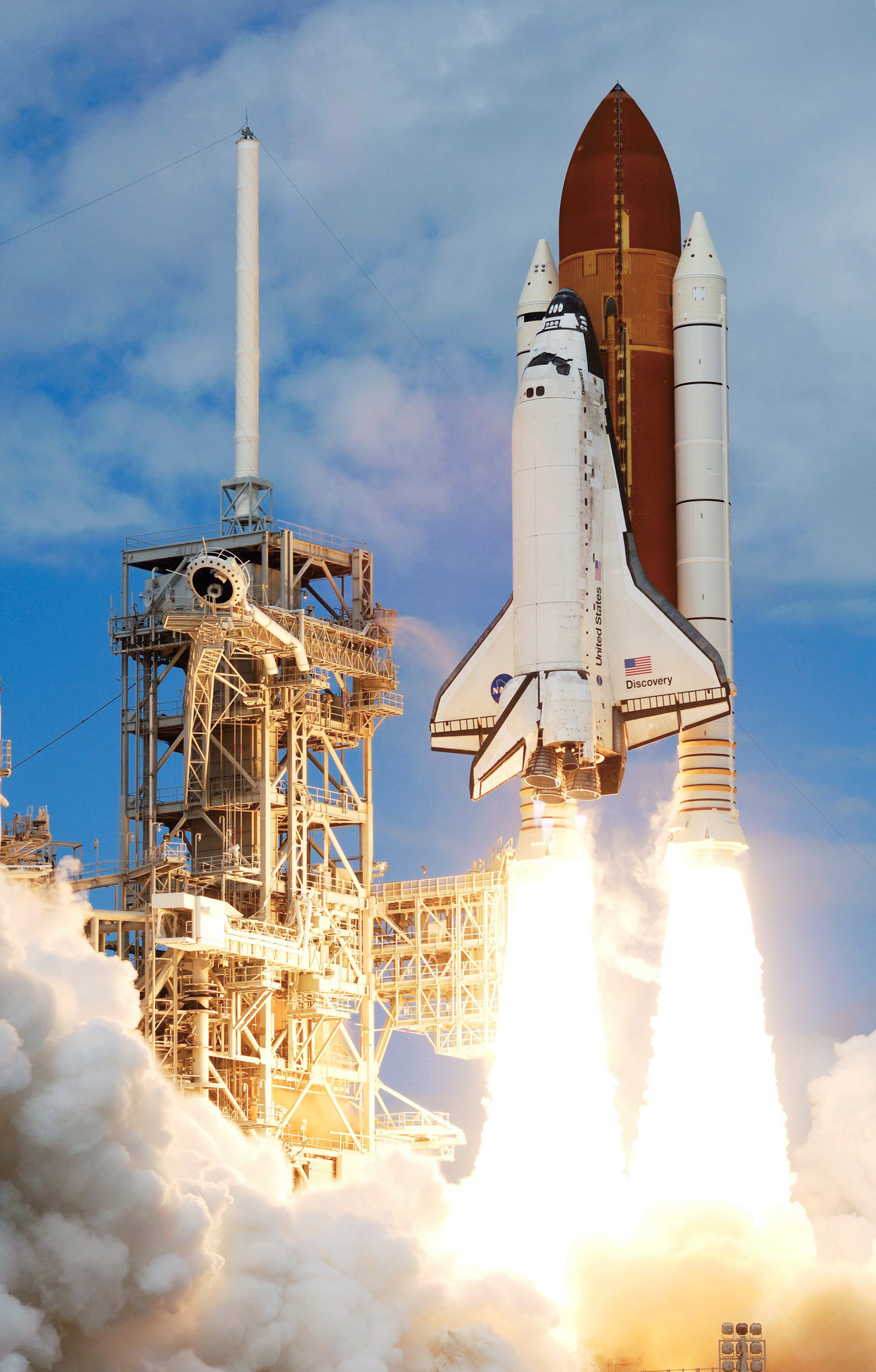
Rockets carrying the Space Shuttle Discovery into Earth orbit in 2007

The first rockets were used as propulsion systems for arrows, and may have appeared as early as the 10th century in Song dynasty China. However, more solid documentary evidence does not appear until the 13th century. The technology probably spread across Eurasia in the wake of the Mongol invasions of the mid-13th century. Usage of rockets as weapons before modern rocketry is attested to in China, Korea, India, and Europe. One of the first recorded rocket launchers is the "wasp nest" fire arrow launcher produced by the Ming dynasty in 1380. In Europe, rockets were also used in the same year at the Battle of Chioggia. The Joseon kingdom of Korea used a type of mobile multiple rocket launcher known as the "Munjong Hwacha" by 1451.

Iron-cased rockets were used by Kingdom of Mysore under the rule of King Hyder Ali. King Hyder Ali and his son King Tipu Sultan, used the rockets effectively against the British East India Company during the 1780s and 1790s. Their conflicts with the company exposed the British to this technology further, which was then used to advance European rocketry with the development of the Congreve rocket in 1805 (Tipu Sultan rockets) during the mid 18th century, and was later modified and used by the British. The later models and improvements were known as the Congreve rocket and used in the Napoleonic Wars.

== Precursors ==
The earliest known example of a device displaying the "principles essential to rocket flight" was around 400 BC when Archytas, a Greek Pythagorean, propelled a wooden bird along suspended wires using steam as propellant. The wooden pigeon was tied to a pole by a wire. When the plug containing the steam was released, the steam propelled the pigeon in circles around the pole. About 300 years later, Hero of Alexandria created a similar "rocket-like device" known as an aeolipile that used steam as propulsion. Aeolipile means "the god of air." A rotatable sphere was mounted on top of a water basin, which was heated with fire, turning the water into steam that traveled into the sphere through 2 pipes. The steam escaped through two L-shaped tubes on opposite sides, causing the sphere to rotate. These devices have been described as "steam rockets", "proto-rockets" and as employing "principles essential to rocket flight" and the "action-reaction principle" that preceded true rockets.This aeolipile showed how we can use the action-reaction principle to move things at high speeds, which later became the core concept of a rocket.

== Origins ==
Rocket

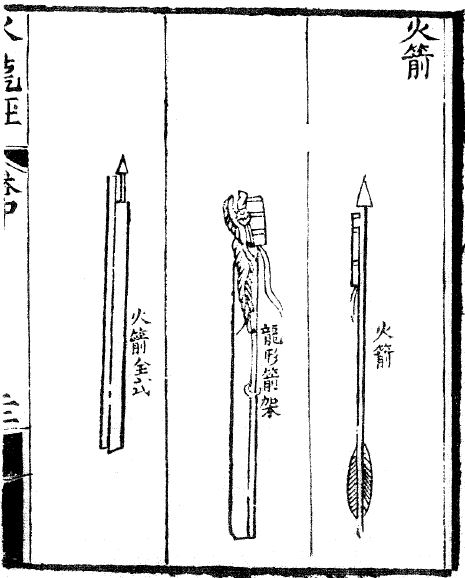
Depiction of rocket arrows, from the Huolongjing. The left arrow reads 'fire arrow' (huo jian), the middle is a 'dragon shaped arrow frame' (long xing jian jia), and the left is a 'complete fire arrow' (huo jian quan shi).

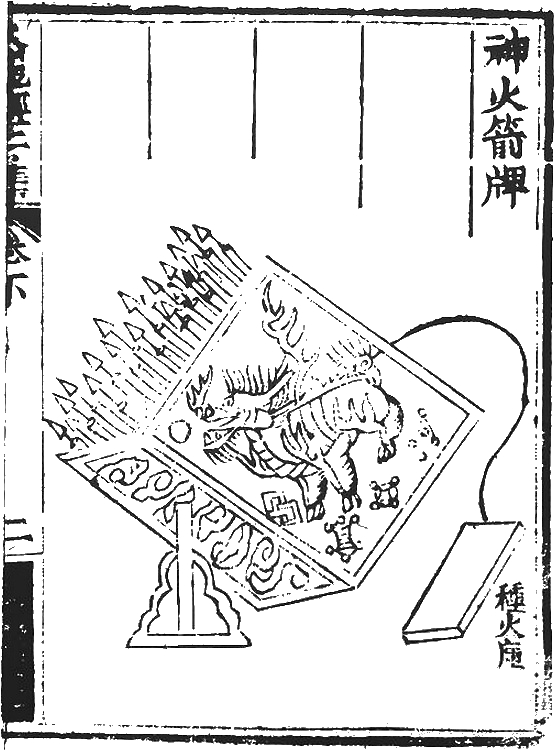
The 'divine fire arrow screen' from the Huolongjing. A stationary arrow launcher that carries one hundred fire arrows. It is activated by a trap-like mechanism, possibly of wheellock design.

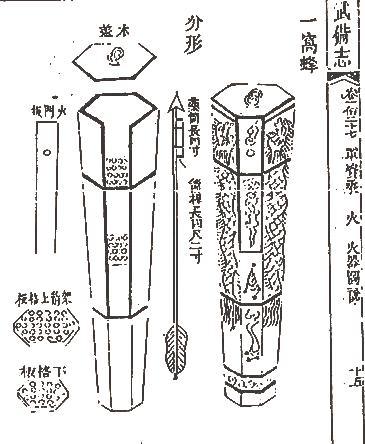
A "nest of bees" (yi wo feng 一窩蜂) arrow rocket launcher as depicted in the Wubei Zhi. So called because of its hexagonal honeycomb shape.

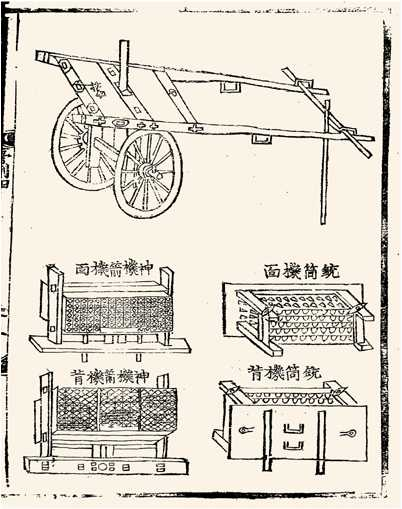
A hwacha manual from the Gukjo orye seorye (1474)

The dating of the invention of the first gunpowder rocket, otherwise known as the gunpowder-propelled fire arrow, is disputed. The History of Song attributes the invention to two different people at different times: Feng Zhisheng in 969 and Tang Fu in 1000. However, Joseph Needham argues that rockets could not have existed before the 12th century, since the gunpowder formulas listed in the Wujing Zongyao are not suitable as rocket propellant.

Rockets may have been used as early as 1232, when reports appeared describing fire arrows and 'iron pots' that could be heard for 5 leagues (25 km, or 15 miles) when they exploded upon impact, causing devastation for a radius of 600 meters (2,000 feet), apparently due to shrapnel. A "flying fire-lance" that had re-usable barrels was also mentioned to have been used by the Jin dynasty (1115–1234). Rockets are recorded to have been used by the Song navy in a military exercise dated to 1245. Internal-combustion rocket propulsion is mentioned in a reference to 1264, recording that the 'ground-rat,' a type of firework, had frightened the Empress-Mother Gongsheng at a feast held in her honor by her son the Emperor Lizong.

=== Later developments ===
Subsequently, rockets are included in the military treatise Huolongjing, also known as the Fire Drake Manual, written by the Chinese artillery officer Jiao Yu in the mid-14th century. This text mentions the first known multistage rocket, the 'fire-dragon issuing from the water' (huo long chu shui), thought to have been used by the Chinese navy.

Rocket launchers known as "wasp nests" were ordered by the Ming army in 1380. In 1400, the Ming loyalist Li Jinglong used rocket launchers against the army of Zhu Di (Yongle Emperor).

== Spread of rocket technology ==
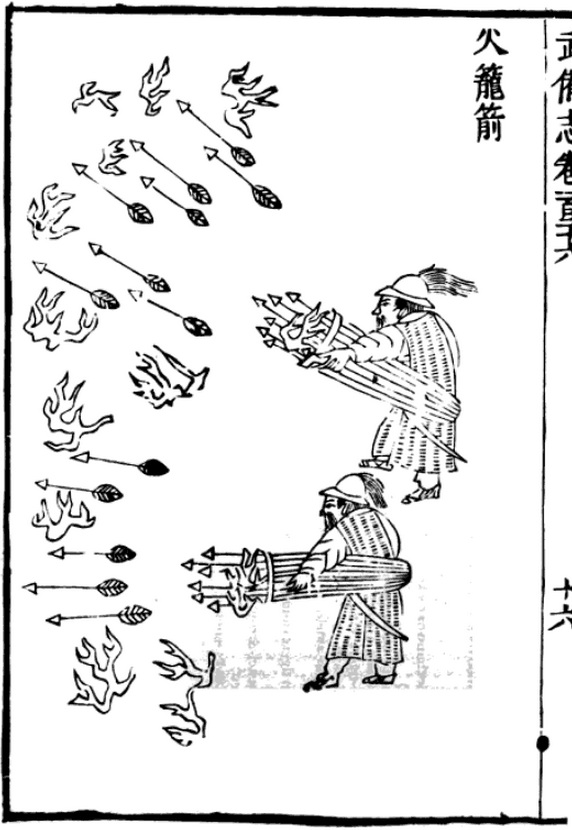
An illustration of fire arrow launchers as depicted in the Wubei Zhi (17th century). The launcher is constructed using basketry.

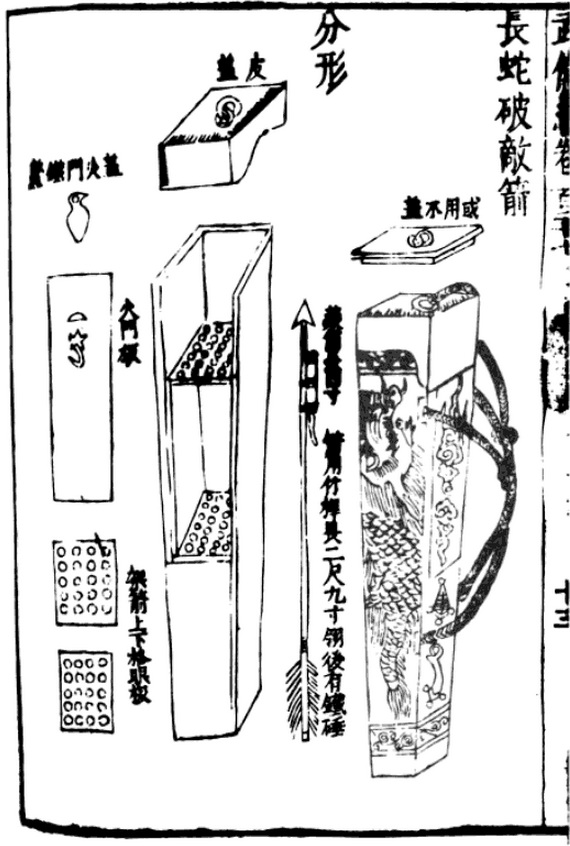
A "long serpent enemy breaking" fire arrow launcher as depicted in the Wubei Zhi (17th century). It carries 32 medium small poisoned rockets and comes with a sling to carry on the back.

The American historian Frank H. Winter proposed in The Proceedings of the Twentieth and Twenty-First History Symposia of the International Academy of Astronautics that southern China and the Laotian community rocket festivals might have been key in the subsequent spread of rocketry in the Orient.

=== Mongols ===
The Chinese fire arrow was adopted by the Mongols in northern China, who employed Chinese rocketry experts as mercenaries in the Mongol army. Rockets are thought to have spread via the Mongol invasions to other areas of Eurasia in the mid 13th century.

Rocket-like weapons are reported to have been used at the Battle of Mohi in the year 1241.

=== Middle East ===
Between 1270 and 1280, Hasan al-Rammah wrote his al-furusiyyah wa al-manasib al-harbiyya (The Book of Military Horsemanship and Ingenious War Devices), which included 107 gunpowder recipes, 22 of which are for rockets. According to Ahmad Y Hassan, al-Rammah's recipes were more explosive than rockets used in China at the time. The terminology used by al-Rammah indicates a Chinese origin for the gunpowder weapons he wrote about, such as rockets and fire lances. Ibn al-Baitar, an Arab from Spain who had immigrated to Egypt, described saltpeter as "snow of China" (Arabic: ثلج الصين thalj al-ṣīn). Al-Baytar died in 1248. The earlier Arab historians called saltpeter "Chinese snow" and "Chinese salt." The Arabs used the name "Chinese arrows" to refer to rockets. The Arabs called fireworks "Chinese flowers". While saltpeter was called "Chinese Snow" by Arabs, it was called "Chinese salt" (Persian: نمک چینی namak-i čīnī) by the Iranians, or "salt from the Chinese marshes" (namak shūra chīnī Persian: نمک شوره چيني).

=== Indian subcontinent ===
In the Indian subcontinent, mercenaries are recorded to have used hand held rockets in 1300. By the mid-14th century, Indian armies were also using rockets in warfare.

In the Mughal Empire under Akbar's reign during the 16th century, Mughal artillery rockets began to use metal casing, which made them more weatherproof and allowed a larger amount of gunpowder, increasing their destructive power. Mughal ban iron rockets were described by European visitors, including François Bernier who witnessed the 1658 Battle of Samugarh fought between brothers Aurangzeb and Dara Shikoh.

==== Mysorean rockets ====
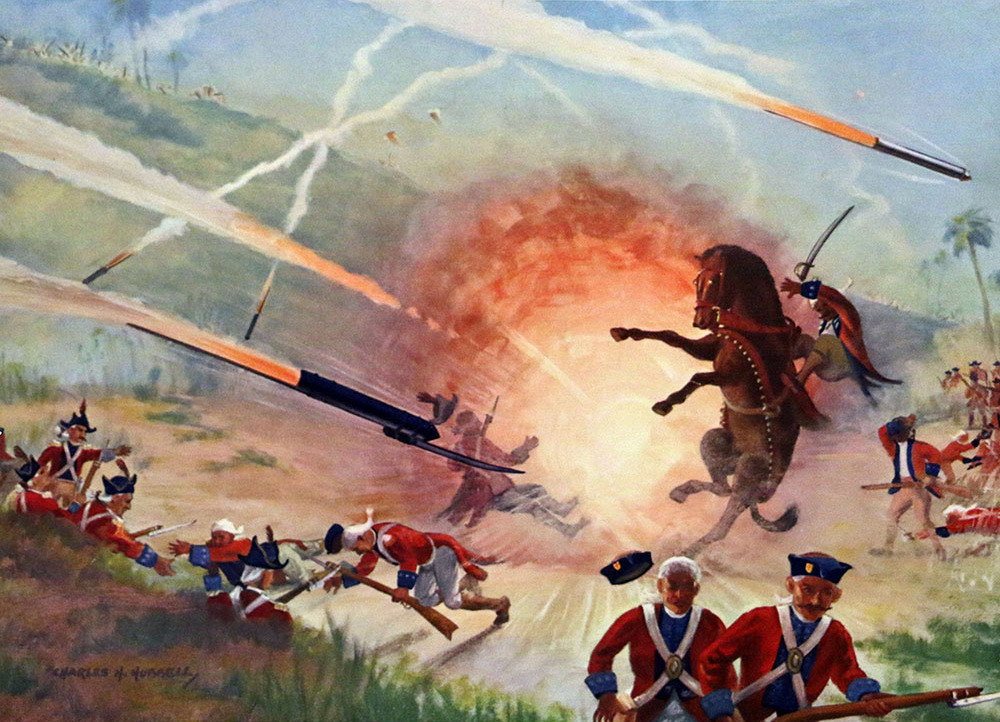
A painting showing the Mysorean army fighting the British forces with Mysorean rockets.

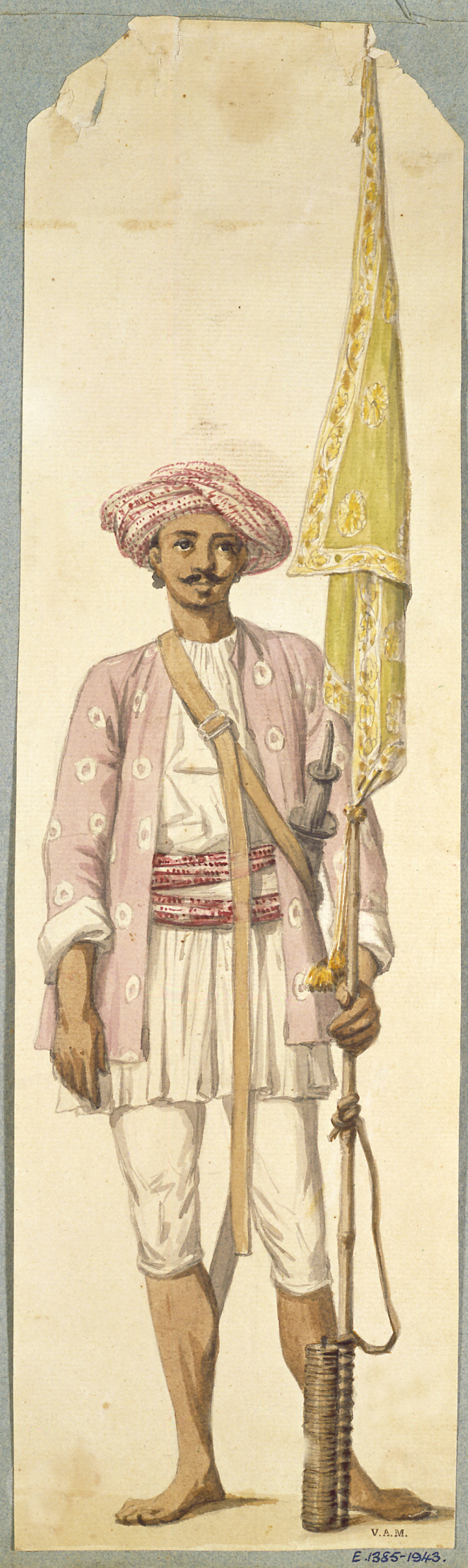
A Mysorean soldier from India, using his Mysorean rocket as a flagstaff (Robert Home, 1793/4).

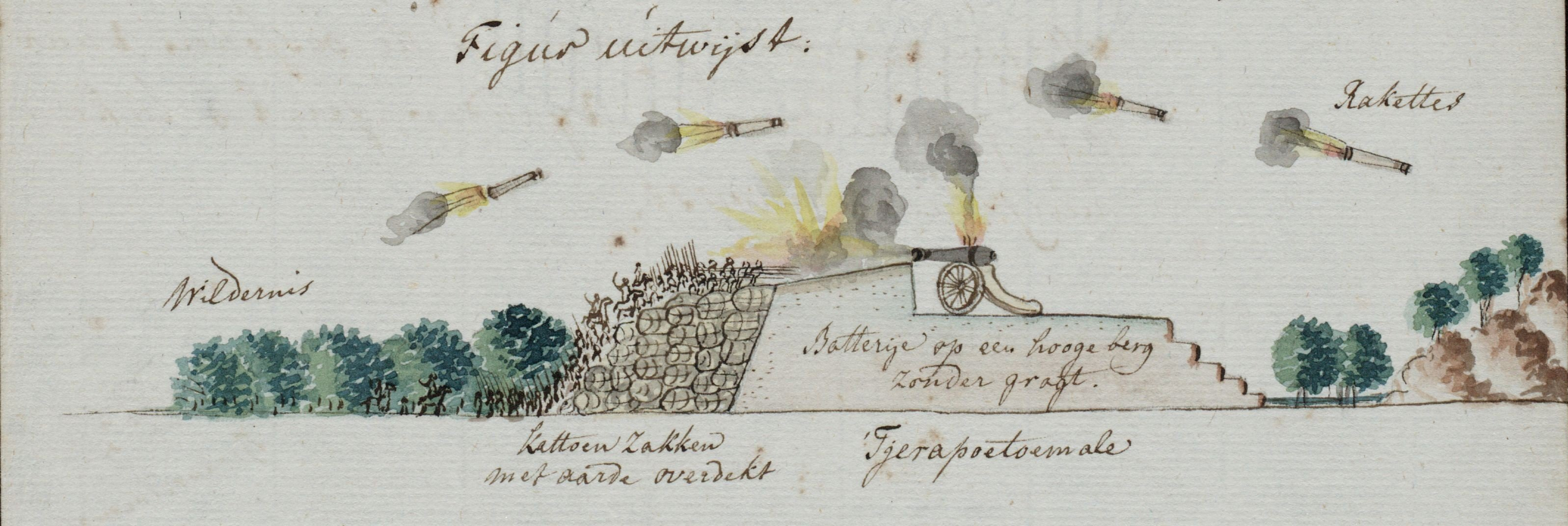
Use of rockets in an assault by Mysorean troops on Travancore Line fortification (29 December 1789)

The Kingdom of Mysore used rockets during the 18th century, including during the Anglo-Mysore Wars, which ended in the British conquering Mysore. The British then took an active interest in the technology and developed it further during the 19th century. Use of iron tubes for holding propellant enabled higher thrust and longer range for the missile (up to 2 km range).

After Tipu's defeat in the Fourth Anglo-Mysore War and the capture of the Mysore iron rockets, they were influential in British rocket development, inspiring the Congreve rocket, which was soon put into use in the Napoleonic Wars.

==== Later use ====
According to James Forbes Marathas also used iron-encased rockets in their battles.

=== Korea ===
The Korean kingdom of Joseon started producing gunpowder in 1374 and was producing cannons and rockets by 1377. However the multiple rocket launching carts known as the "Munjong hwacha" did not appear until 1451.

=== Europe ===
In Europe, Roger Bacon mentions gunpowder in his Opus Majus of 1267.

However rockets do not feature in European warfare until the 1380 Battle of Chioggia. According to the 18th-century historian Ludovico Antonio Muratori, rockets were used in the war between the Republics of Genoa and Venice at Chioggia in 1380. It is uncertain whether Muratori was correct in his interpretation, as the reference might also have been to bombard, but Muratori is the source for the widespread claim that the earliest recorded European use of rocket artillery dates to 1380.

Jean Froissart (c. 1337 – c. 1405) had the idea of launching rockets through tubes, so that they could make more accurate flights. Froissart's idea is a forerunner of the modern Rocket-propelled grenade.

Konrad Kyeser described rockets in his famous military treatise Bellifortis around 1405. Kyeser describes three types of rockets, swimming, free flying, and captive.

Joanes de Fontana in Bellicorum instrumentorum liber (c. 1420) described flying rockets in the shape of doves, running rockets in the shape of hares, and a large car driven by three rockets, as well as a large rocket torpedo with the head of a sea monster.

==== Later developments ====
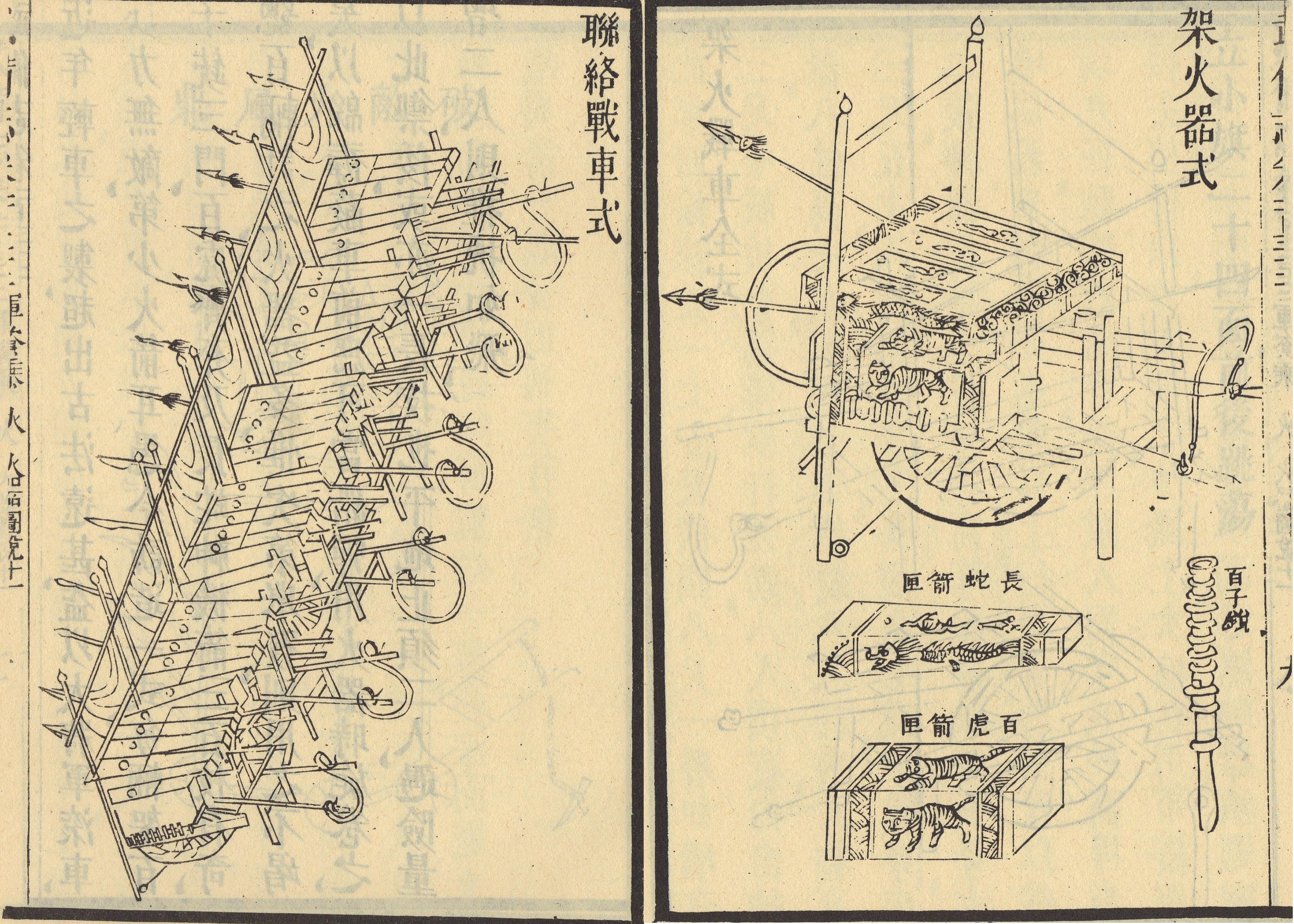
Rocket carts from the Wubei Zhi (17th century)

In the mid-16th century, Conrad Haas wrote a book that described rocket technology that combined fireworks and weapons technologies. This manuscript was discovered in 1961, in the Sibiu public records (Sibiu public records Varia II 374). His work dealt with the theory of motion of multi-stage rockets, different fuel mixtures using liquid fuel, and introduced delta-shape fins and bell-shaped nozzles.

The name Rocket comes from the Italian rocchetta, meaning "bobbin" or "little spindle", given due to the similarity in shape to the bobbin or spool used to hold the thread to be fed to a spinning wheel. The Italian term was adopted into German in the mid 16th century, by Leonhard Fronsperger in a book on rocket artillery published in 1557, using the spelling rogete, and by Conrad Haas as rackette; adoption into English dates to ca. 1610. Johann Schmidlap, a German fireworks maker, is believed to have experimented with staging in 1590.

Lagari Hasan Çelebi was a legendary Ottoman aviator who, according to an account written by Evliya Çelebi, made a successful crewed rocket flight. Evliya Çelebi purported that in 1633 Lagari launched in a 7-winged rocket using 50 okka (63.5 kg, or 140 lbs) of gunpowder from Sarayburnu, the point below Topkapı Palace in Istanbul.

"Artis Magnae Artilleriae pars prima" ("Great Art of Artillery, the First Part", also known as "The Complete Art of Artillery"), first printed in Amsterdam in 1650, was translated to French in 1651, German in 1676, English and Dutch in 1729 and Polish in 1963. For over two centuries, this work of Polish–Lithuanian Commonwealth nobleman Kazimierz Siemienowicz was used in Europe as a basic artillery manual. The book provided the standard designs for creating rockets, fireballs, and other pyrotechnic devices. It contained a large chapter on caliber, construction, production and properties of rockets (for both military and civil purposes), including multi-stage rockets, batteries of rockets, and rockets with delta wing stabilizers (instead of the common guiding rods).

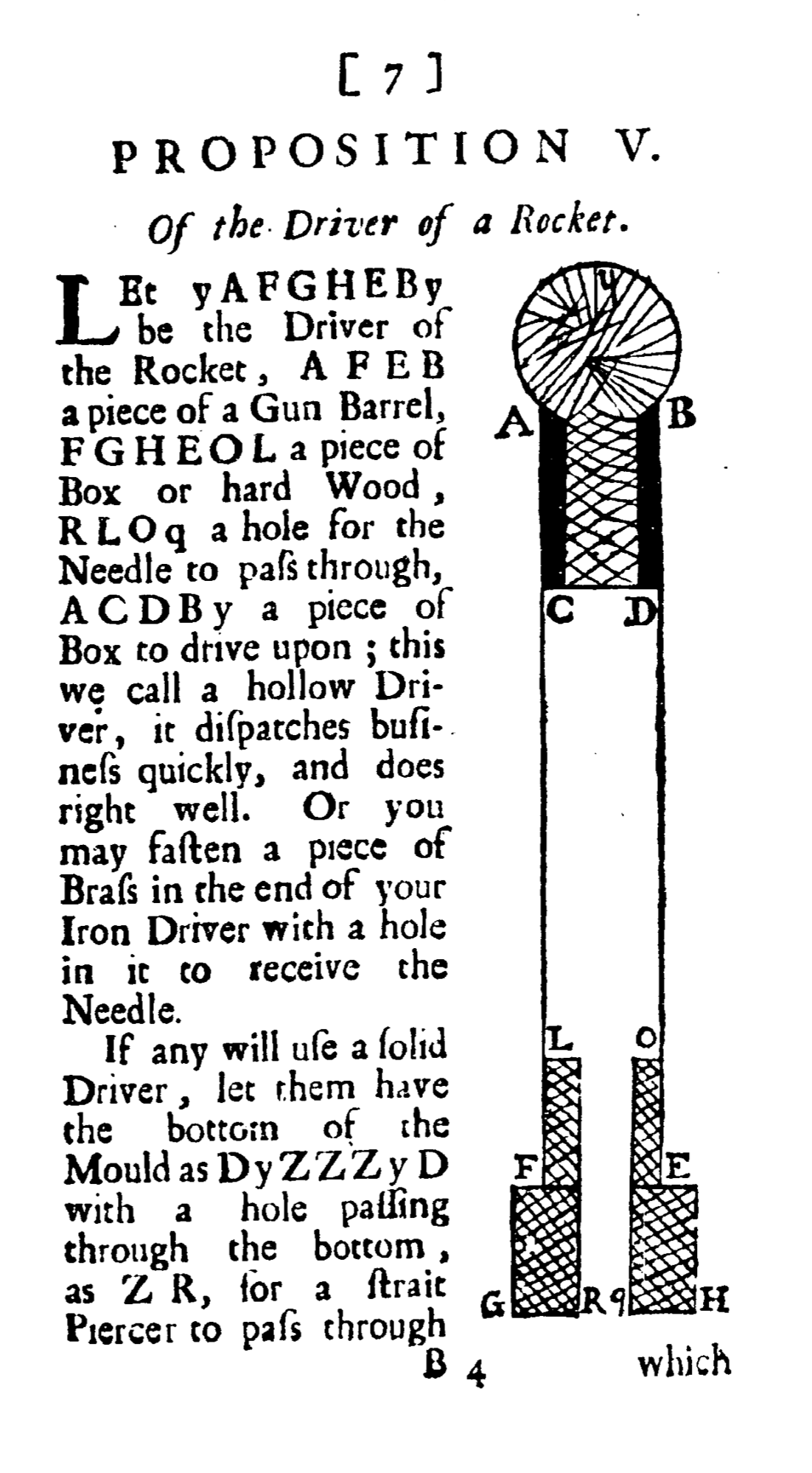
Robert Anderson suggests using metal for rocket casing

In his 1696 work, ‘The Making of Rockets. In two Parts. The First containing the Making of Rockets for the meanest Capacity. The other to make Rockets by a Duplicate Proposition, to 1,000 pound Weight or higher,’ Robert Anderson proposed constructing rockets out of "a piece of a Gun Barrel" whose metal casing is much stronger than pasteboard or wood.

== 19th century ==
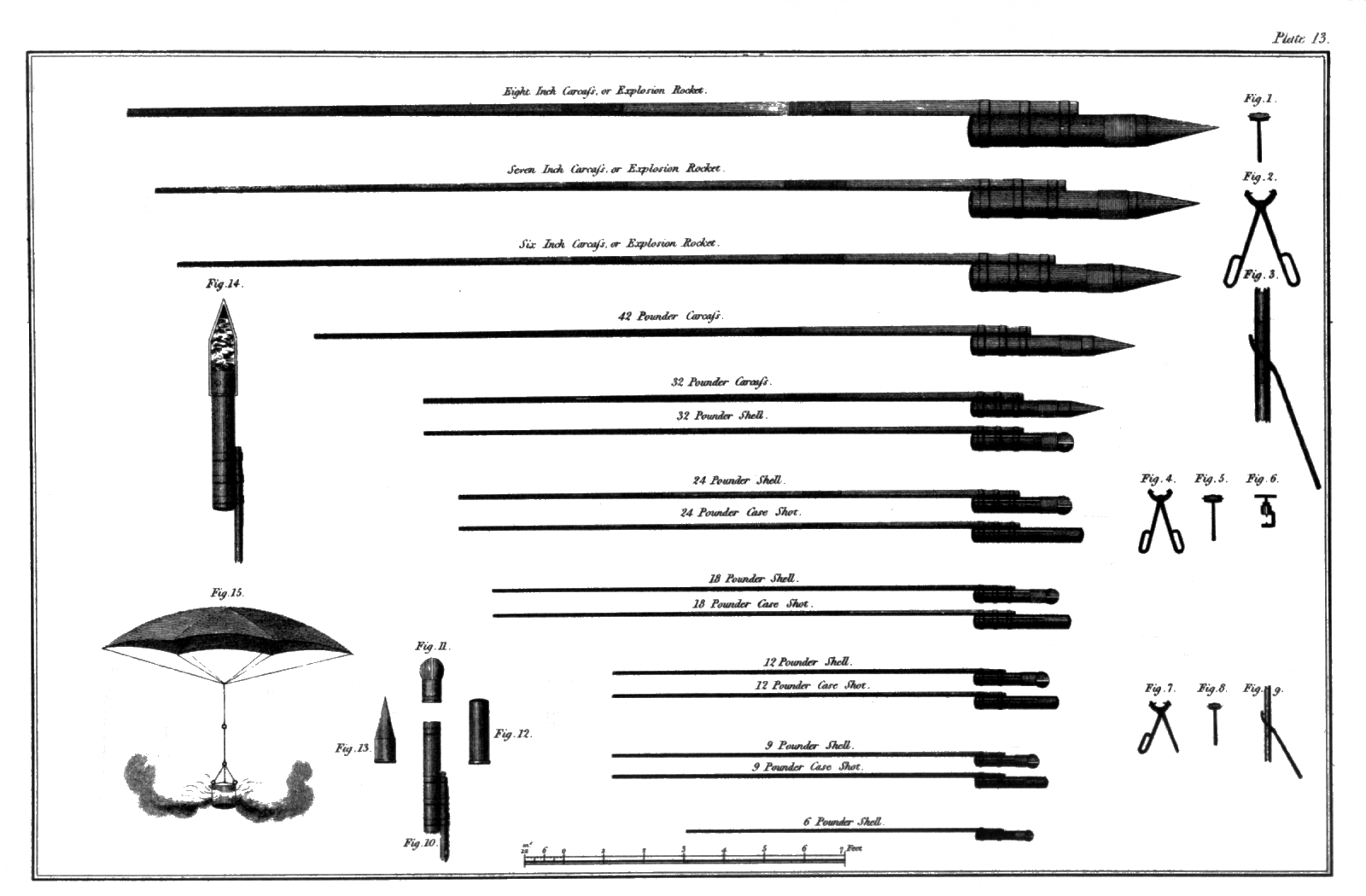
The Congreve rocket

William Congreve (1772–1828), son of the Comptroller of the Royal Arsenal, Woolwich, London, became a major figure in the field. From 1801 Congreve researched the original design of Mysore rockets and started a vigorous development program at the Arsenal's laboratory. Congreve prepared a new propellant mixture, and developed a rocket motor with a strong iron tube with a conical nose. This early Congreve rocket weighed about 32 pounds (14.5 kilograms). The Royal Arsenal's first demonstration of solid-fuel rockets took place in 1805. The rockets were effectively used during the Napoleonic Wars and the War of 1812. Congreve published three books on rocketry.

Subsequently, the use of military rockets spread throughout the western world. At the Battle of Baltimore in 1814, the rockets fired on Fort McHenry by the rocket vessel HMS Erebus were the source of the rockets' red glare described by Francis Scott Key in "The Star-Spangled Banner". Rockets were also used in the Battle of Waterloo in 1815.

Early rockets were very inaccurate. Without the use of spinning or any controlling feedback-loop, they had a strong tendency to veer sharply away from their intended course. The early Mysorean rockets and their successor, British Congreve rockets reduced veer somewhat by attaching a long stick to the end of a rocket (similar to modern bottle rockets) to make it harder for the rocket to change course. The largest of the Congreve rockets was the 32-pound (14.5 kg) Carcass, which had a 15-foot (4.6 m) stick. Originally, sticks were mounted on the side, but this was later changed to mounting them in the center of the rocket, reducing drag and enabling the rocket to be more accurately fired from a segment of pipe.

In 1815 Alexander Dmitrievich Zasyadko (1779–1837) began his work on developing military gunpowder-rockets. He constructed rocket-launching platforms (which allowed firing of rockets in salvos - 6 rockets at a time) and gun-laying devices. Zasyadko elaborated a tactic for military use of rocket weaponry. In 1820 Zasyadko was appointed head of the Petersburg Armory, Okhtensky Powder Factory, pyrotechnic laboratory and the first Highest Artillery School in Russia. He organized rocket production in a special rocket workshop and formed the first rocket sub-unit in the Imperial Russian Army.

Artillery captain Józef Bem (1794–1850) of the Kingdom of Poland started experiments with what was then called in Polish raca kongrewska. These culminated in his 1819 report Notes sur les fusees incendiares (German edition: Erfahrungen über die Congrevischen Brand-Raketen bis zum Jahre 1819 in der Königlichen Polnischen Artillerie gesammelt, Weimar 1820). The research took place in the Warsaw Arsenal, where Captain Józef Kosiński also developed multiple-rocket launchers adapted from horse artillery gun carriage. The 1st Rocketeer Corps formed in 1822; it first saw combat during the Polish–Russian War 1830–31.

Accuracy greatly improved in 1844 when William Hale modified the rocket design so that thrust was slightly vectored, causing the rocket to spin along its axis-of-travel like a bullet. The Hale rocket removed the need for a rocket stick, travelled further due to reduced air-resistance, and was far more accurate.

In 1865 the British Colonel Edward Mounier Boxer built an improved version of the Congreve rocket by placing two rockets in one tube, one behind the other.

== Early 20th-century rocket pioneers ==
At the beginning of the 20th century, there was a burst of scientific investigation into interplanetary travel, fueled by the creativity of fiction writers such as Jules Verne and H. G. Wells as well as by philosophical movements like Russian cosmism. Scientists seized on the rocket as a technology that was able to achieve this in real life, a possibility first recognized in 1861 by William Leitch.

In 1903, high school mathematics teacher Konstantin Tsiolkovsky (1857–1935), inspired by Verne and Cosmism, published The Exploration of Cosmic Space by Means of Reaction Devices, the first serious scientific work on space travel. The Tsiolkovsky rocket equation—the principle that governs rocket propulsion—is named in his honor (although it had been discovered previously, Tsiolkovsky is honored as being the first to apply it to the question of whether rockets could achieve speeds necessary for space travel). He also advocated the use of liquid hydrogen and oxygen for propellant, calculating their maximum exhaust velocity. His work was essentially unknown outside the Soviet Union, but inside the country it inspired further research, experimentation and the formation of the Society for Studies of Interplanetary Travel in 1924.

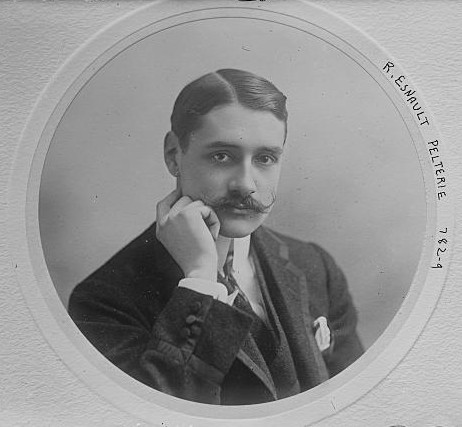
Robert Esnault-Pelterie (1909).

In 1912, Robert Esnault-Pelterie published a lecture on rocket theory and interplanetary travel. He independently derived Tsiolkovsky's rocket equation, did basic calculations about the energy required to make round trips to the Moon and planets, and he proposed the use of atomic power (i.e. radium) to power a jet drive.

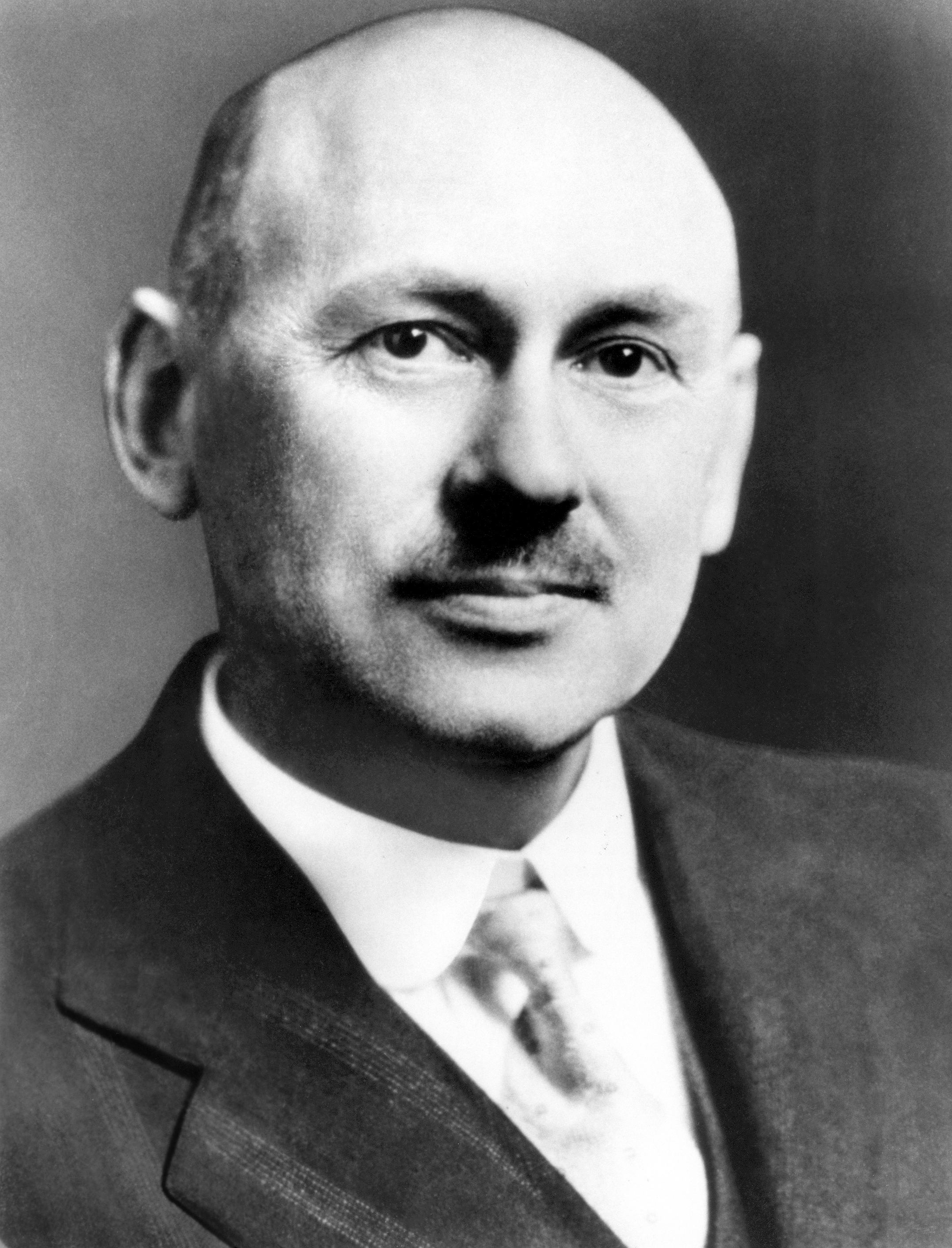
Robert Goddard

In 1912, Robert Goddard, inspired from an early age by H.G. Wells and by his personal interest in science, began a serious analysis of rockets, concluding that conventional solid-fuel rockets needed to be improved in three ways. First, fuel should be burned in a small combustion chamber, instead of building the entire propellant container to withstand the high pressures. Second, rockets could be arranged in stages. Finally, the exhaust speed (and thus the efficiency) could be greatly increased to beyond the speed of sound by using a De Laval nozzle. He patented these concepts in 1914. He also independently developed the mathematics of rocket flight. Goddard worked on developing solid-propellant rockets since 1914, and demonstrated a light battlefield rocket to the US Army Signal Corps only five days before the signing of the armistice that ended World War I. He also started developing liquid-propellant rockets in 1921, yet he had not been taken seriously by the public. Nevertheless, Goddard reclusively developed and flew a small liquid-fueled rocket. He developed the technology for 214 patents, 212 of which his wife published after his death.

During World War I Yves Le Prieur, a French naval officer (who later invented a pioneering scuba-diving apparatus), developed air-to-air solid-fuel Le Prieur rockets - used to destroy captive observation balloons (called saucisses - "sausages" in French, or Drachen - "dragons" in German) used by German artillery-spotters. The rather crude black-powder, steel-tipped incendiary rockets made by the Ruggieri firm were first tested from a Voisin aircraft, wing-bolted on a fast Picard Pictet sports-car and then used in battle on real aircraft from May 1916. A typical layout involved eight electrically fired Le Prieur rockets fitted on the interplane struts of a Nieuport aircraft. When fired from a sufficiently short distance, a spread of Le Prieur rockets proved quite deadly. Belgian ace Willy Coppens claimed dozens of Drachen kills during World War I.

In 1920, Goddard published his ideas and experimental results in A Method of Reaching Extreme Altitudes. The work included remarks about sending a solid-fuel rocket to the Moon, which attracted worldwide attention and was both praised and ridiculed. A New York Times editorial suggested, referring to Newton's third law:

That Professor Goddard, with his 'chair' in Clark College and the countenancing of the Smithsonian Institution, does not know the relation of action to reaction, and of the need to have something better than a vacuum against which to react – to say that would be absurd. Of course he only seems to lack the knowledge ladled out daily in high schools."

— New York Times, 13 January 1920

In reality, in terms of Newton's third law, a rocket "pushes against" its exhaust gases, so the lack of surrounding air is not relevant.

In 1923, German Hermann Oberth (1894–1989) published Die Rakete zu den Planetenräumen ("The Rocket into Planetary Space"), a version of his doctoral thesis, after LMU Munich had rejected it. In 1929, he published a book, Wege zur Raumschiffahrt ("Ways to Spaceflight"), and static-fired an uncooled liquid-fueled rocket engine for a brief time.

In 1924, Tsiolkovsky also wrote about multi-stage rockets, in 'Cosmic Rocket Trains'.

== Modern rocketry ==
=== Pre-World War II ===
Robert Goddard and the first liquid-fueled rocket.

Modern rockets originated in the US when Robert Goddard attached a supersonic (de Laval) nozzle to the combustion chamber of a solid-fueled rocket engine. This turned the hot combustion chamber gas into a cooler, highly directed hypersonic jet of gas, more than doubling the thrust and raising the engine efficiency from 2% to 64%. On 16 March 1926, Goddard launched the world's first liquid-fueled rocket in Auburn, Massachusetts.

During the 1920s, a number of rocket research organizations appeared worldwide. Rocketry in the Soviet Union began in 1921 with extensive work at the Gas Dynamics Laboratory (GDL), where the first test-firing of a solid fuel rocket was carried out in March 1928, which flew for about 1,300 meters In 1931 the world's first successful use of rockets to assist take-off of aircraft were carried out on a U-1, the Soviet designation for an Avro 504 trainer, which achieved about one hundred successful assisted takeoffs. Further developments in the early 1930s included firing rockets from aircraft and the ground. In 1932 in-air test firings of RS-82 missiles from a Tupolev I-4 aircraft armed with six launchers successfully took place. In September 1931 the Group for the Study of Reactive Motion (GIRD) was formed and was responsible for the first Soviet liquid propelled rocket launch, the GIRD-9, on 17 August 1933, which reached an altitude of 400 metres (1,300 ft).

In 1933 GDL and GIRD were merged to form the Reactive Scientific Research Institute (RNII) and developments were continued, including designing several variations for ground-to-air, ground-to-ground, air-to-ground and air-to-air combat. The RS-82 rockets were carried by Polikarpov I-15, I-16 and I-153 fighter planes, the Polikarpov R-5 reconnaissance plane and the Ilyushin Il-2 close air support plane, while the heavier RS-132 rockets could be carried by bombers. Many small ships of the Soviet Navy were also fitted with the RS-82 rocket, including the MO-class small guard ship. The earliest known use by the Soviet Air Force of aircraft-launched unguided anti-aircraft rockets in combat against heavier-than-air aircraft took place in August 1939, during the Battle of Khalkhin Gol. A group of Polikarpov I-16 fighters under command of Captain N. Zvonarev were using RS-82 rockets against Japanese aircraft, shooting down 16 fighters and 3 bombers in total. Six Tupolev SB bombers also used RS-132 for ground attack during the Winter War. RNII also built over 100 experimental rocket engines under the direction of Valentin Glushko. Design work included regenerative cooling, hypergolic propellant ignition, and swirling and bi-propellant mixing fuel injectors. However, Glushko's arrest during Stalin's Great Purge in 1938 curtailed the developments.

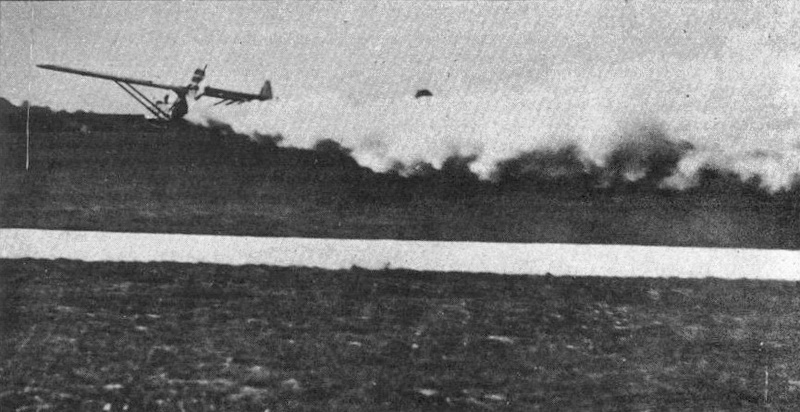
Opel RAK.1 - World's first public manned flight of a rocket plane on September 30, 1929.

In 1927 the German car manufacturer Opel began public demonstrations of rocket vehicles, together with Max Valier and the solid-fuel rocket builder Friedrich Wilhelm Sander, called Opel-RAK under the leadership of Fritz von Opel. In 1928, Fritz von Opel drove a rocket car Opel RAK.1 on the Opel raceway in Rüsselsheim, Germany, and later the dedicated RAK2 rocket car at the AVUS speedway in Berlin. In 1928, Opel, Valier and Sander equipped the Lippisch Ente glider, which Opel had purchased, with rocket power and launched the manned glider. The "Ente" was destroyed on its second flight. Eventually glider pioneer Julius Hatry was tasked by von Opel to construct a dedicated glider, again called Opel-RAK.1, for his rocket program. On September 30, 1929, von Opel himself piloted the RAK.1, the world's first public manned rocket-powered flight from the Frankfurt-Rebstock airport, but experienced a hard landing. The Opel-RAK program and the public demonstrations of ground and air vehicles drew large crowds and caused public excitement in Germany known as "rocket rumble".

An amateur rocket group, the VfR, co-founded by Max Valier, included Wernher von Braun, who eventually became the head of the army research station that designed the V-2 rocket weapon for the Nazis. When private rocket-engineering became forbidden in Germany, Sander was arrested by Gestapo in 1935, convicted of treason, sentenced to 5 years in prison, and forced to sell his company. He died in 1938.

Lieutenant Colonel Karl Emil Becker, head of the German Army's Ballistics and Munitions Branch, gathered a small team of engineers that included Walter Dornberger and Leo Zanssen, to figure out how to use rockets as long-range artillery in order to get around the Treaty of Versailles' ban on research and development of long-range cannons. Wernher von Braun, a young engineering prodigy who as an eighteen-year-old student helped Hermann Oberth build his liquid rocket engine, was recruited by Becker and Dornberger to join their secret army program at Kummersdorf-West in 1932. Von Braun dreamed of conquering outer space with rockets and did not initially see the military value in missile technology.

In 1927 a team of German rocket engineers, including Opel RAK's Max Valier, had formed the Verein für Raumschiffahrt (Society for Space Travel, or VfR), and in 1931 launched a liquid propellant rocket (using oxygen and gasoline).

Similar work was done from 1932 onwards by the Austrian professor Eugen Sänger, who migrated to Germany in 1936 and worked on rocket-powered spaceplanes such as Silbervogel (sometimes called the "antipodal" bomber).

On November 12, 1932, at a farm in Stockton NJ, the American Interplanetary Society's attempt to static-fire their first rocket (based on German Rocket Society designs) failed in a fire.

In 1936, a British research programme based at Fort Halstead in Kent under the direction of Dr. Alwyn Crow started work on a series of unguided solid-fuel rockets that could be used as anti-aircraft weapons. In 1939, a number of test firings were carried out in the British colony of Jamaica, on a specially built range.

In the 1930s, the German Reichswehr (which in 1935 became the Wehrmacht) began to take an interest in rocketry. Artillery restrictions imposed by the 1919 Treaty of Versailles limited Germany's access to long-distance weaponry. Seeing the possibility of using rockets as long-range artillery fire, the Wehrmacht initially funded the VfR team, but because their focus was strictly scientific, created its own research team. At the behest of military leaders, Wernher von Braun, at the time a young aspiring rocket scientist, joined the military (followed by two former VfR members) and developed long-range weapons for use in World War II by Nazi Germany.

In June 1938, the Soviet Reactive Scientific Research Institute (RNII) began developing a multiple rocket launcher based on the RS-132 rocket. In August 1939, the completed rocket was the BM-13 / Katyusha rocket launcher (BM stands for боевая машина (translit. boyevaya mashina), 'combat vehicle' for M-13 rockets). Towards the end of 1938 the first significant large scale testing of the rocket launchers took place, 233 rockets of various types were used. A salvo of rockets could completely straddle a target at a range of 5,500 metres (3.4 mi). Various rocket tests were conducted through 1940, and the BM-13-16 with launch rails for sixteen rockets was authorized for production. Only forty launchers were built before Germany invaded the Soviet Union in June 1941.

=== World War II ===
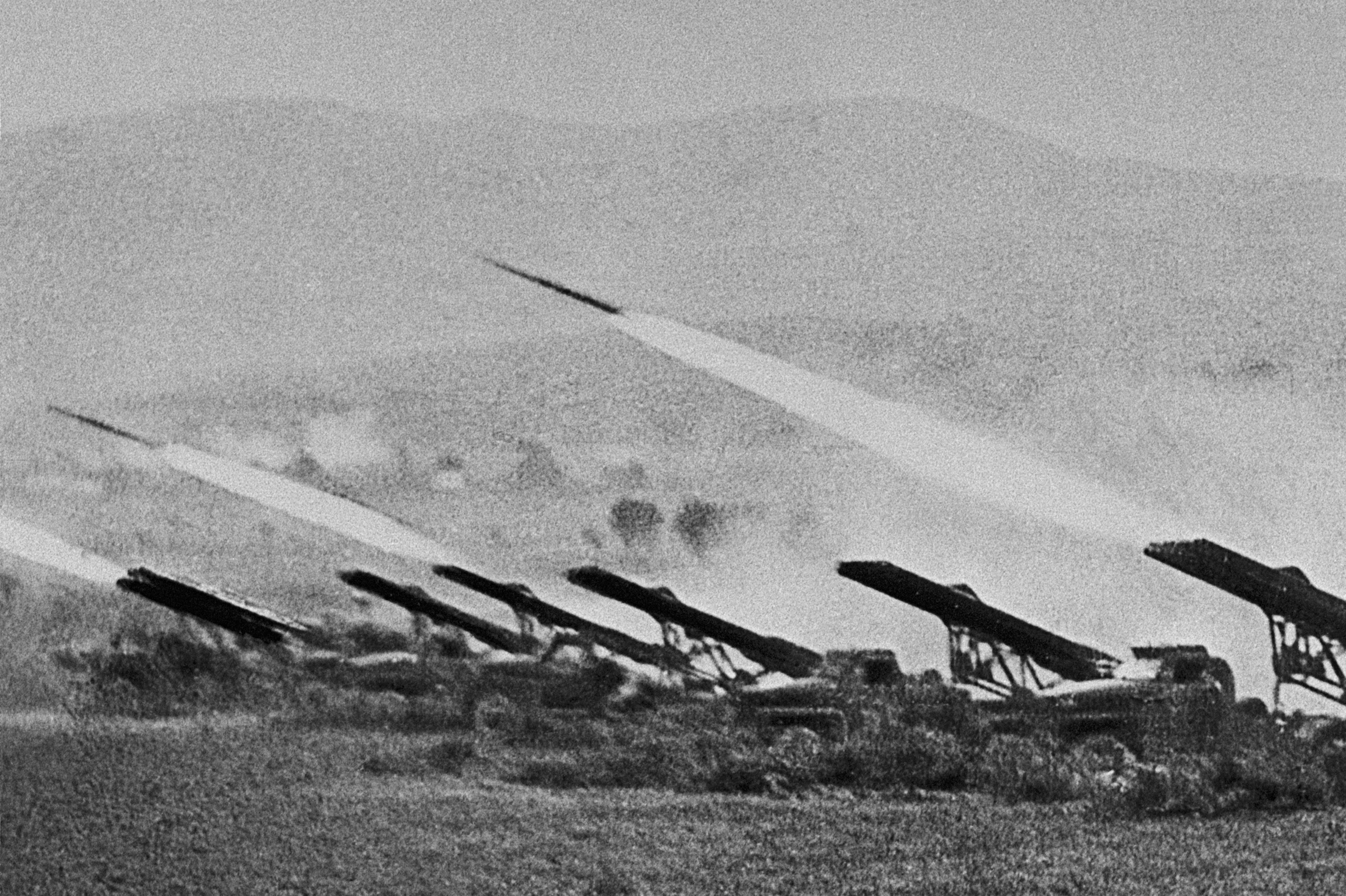
A battery of Katyusha launchers fires at German forces during the Battle of Stalingrad, 6 October 1942

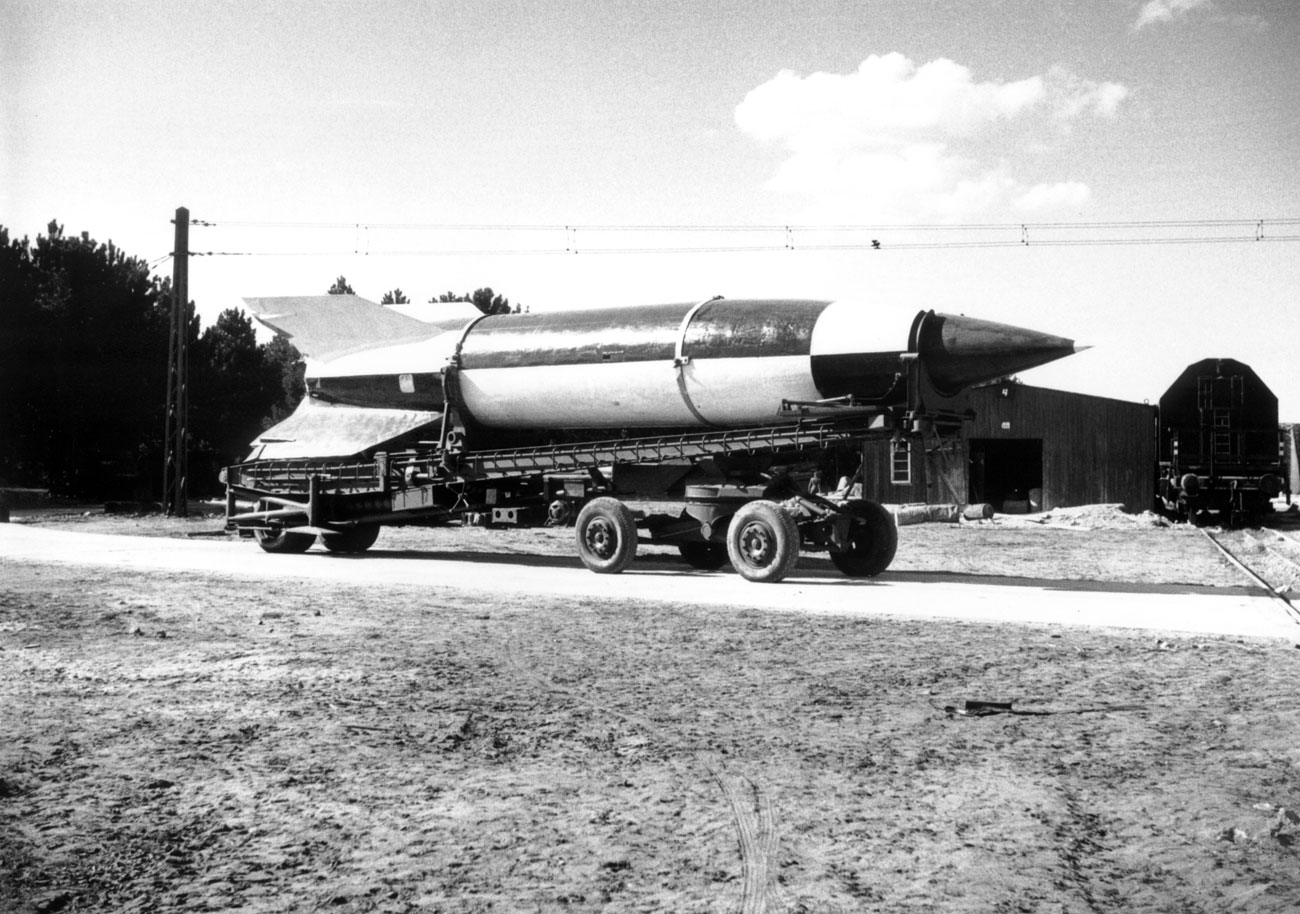
A German V-2 rocket on a Meillerwagen.

Layout of a V-2 rocket.

At the start of the war, the British had equipped their warships with unrotated projectile unguided anti-aircraft rockets, and by 1940, the Germans had developed a surface-to-surface multiple rocket launcher, the Nebelwerfer.

The Soviet Katyusha rocket launchers were top secret in the beginning of World War II. A special unit of the NKVD troops was raised to operate them. On July 14, 1941, an experimental artillery battery of seven launchers was first used in battle at Rudnya in Smolensk Oblast of Russia, under the command of Captain Ivan Flyorov, destroying a concentration of German troops with tanks, armored vehicles and trucks at the marketplace, causing massive German Army casualties and its retreat from the town in panic. After their success in the first month of the war, mass production was ordered and the development of other models proceeded. The Katyusha was inexpensive and could be manufactured in light industrial installations which did not have the heavy equipment to build conventional artillery gun barrels. By the end of 1942, 3,237 Katyusha launchers of all types had been built, and by the end of the war total production reached about 10,000. with 12 million rockets of the RS type produced for the Soviet armed forces.

During the Second World War, Major-General Dornberger was the military head of the army's rocket program, Zanssen became the commandant of the Peenemünde army rocket center, and von Braun was the technical director of the ballistic missile program. They led the team that built the Aggregat-4 (A-4) rocket, which became the first vehicle to reach outer space during its test flight program in 1942 and 1943. By 1943, Germany began mass-producing the A-4 as the Vergeltungswaffe 2 ("Vengeance Weapon" 2, or more commonly, V2), a ballistic missile with a 320-kilometer (200 mi) range carrying a 1,130-kilogram (2,490 lb) warhead at 4,000 kilometers per hour (2,500 mph). Its supersonic speed meant there was no defense against it, and radar detection provided little warning. Germany used the weapon to bombard southern England and parts of Allied-liberated western Europe from 1944 until 1945. After the war, the V-2 became the basis of early American and Soviet rocket designs.

In 1943, production of the V-2 rocket began in Germany. It had an operational range of 300 km (190 mi) and carried a 1,000 kg (2,200 lb) warhead, with an amatol explosive charge. It normally achieved an operational maximum altitude of around 90 km (56 mi), but could achieve 206 km (128 mi) if launched vertically. The vehicle was similar to most modern rockets, with turbopumps, inertial guidance and many other features. Thousands were fired at various Allied nations, mainly Belgium, as well as England and France. While they could not be intercepted, their guidance system design and single conventional warhead meant that they were insufficiently accurate against military targets. A total of 2,754 people in England were killed, and 6,523 were wounded before the launch campaign was ended. There were also 20,000 deaths of slave labour during the construction of V-2s. While it did not significantly affect the course of the war, the V-2 provided a lethal demonstration of the potential for guided rockets as weapons.

In parallel with the guided missile programme in Nazi Germany, rockets were also used on aircraft, either for assisting horizontal take-off (RATO), vertical take-off (Bachem Ba 349 "Natter") or for powering them (Me 163, etc.). During the war Germany also developed several guided and unguided air-to-air, ground-to-air and ground-to-ground missiles (see list of World War II guided missiles of Germany).

=== Post World War II ===
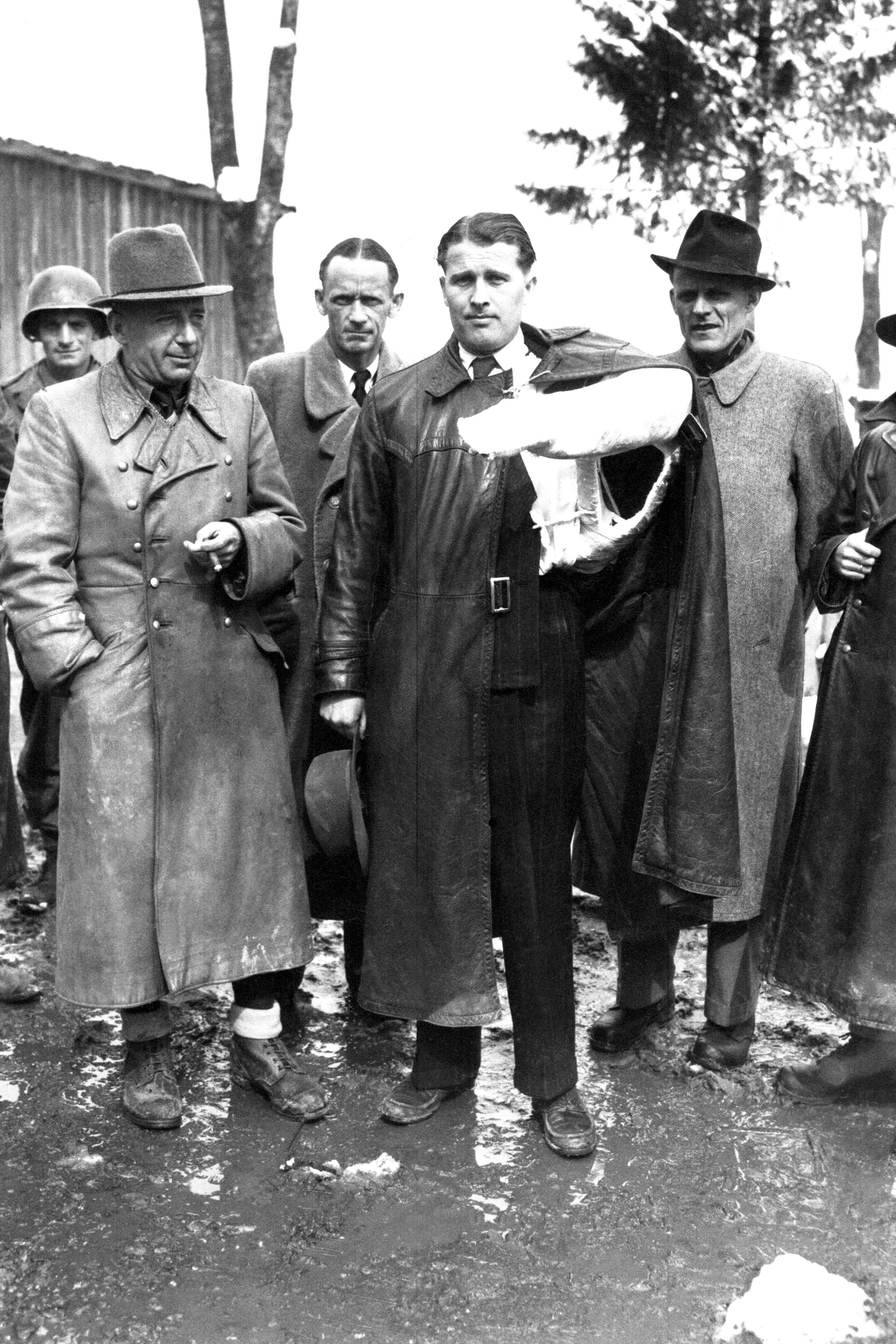
Dornberger and Von Braun after being captured by the Allies.

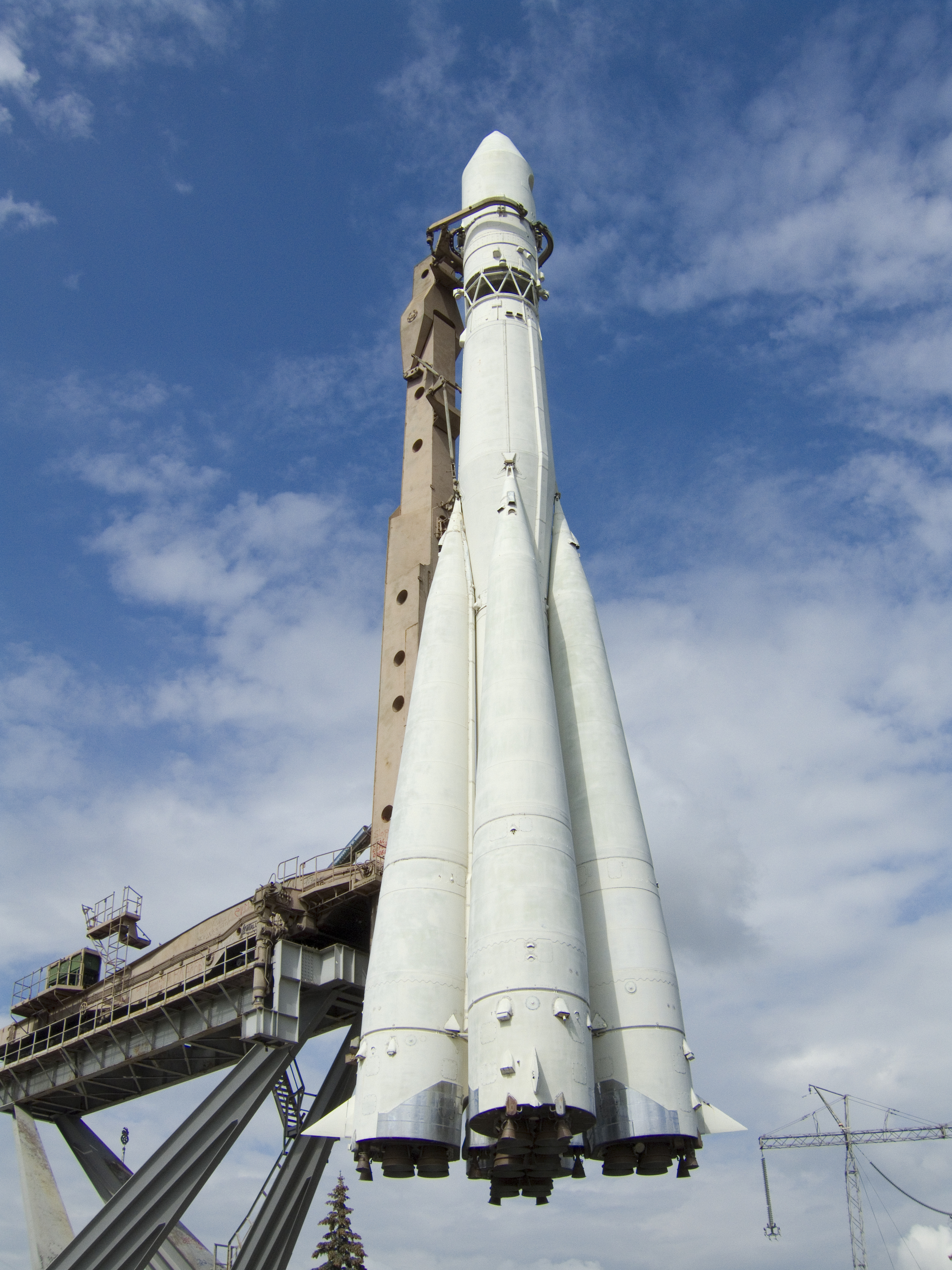
R-7 8K72 "Vostok" permanently displayed at the Moscow Trade Fair at Ostankino; the rocket is held in place by its railway carrier, which is mounted on four diagonal beams that constitute the display pedestal. Here the railway carrier has tilted the rocket upright as it would do so into its launch pad structure—which is missing for this display.

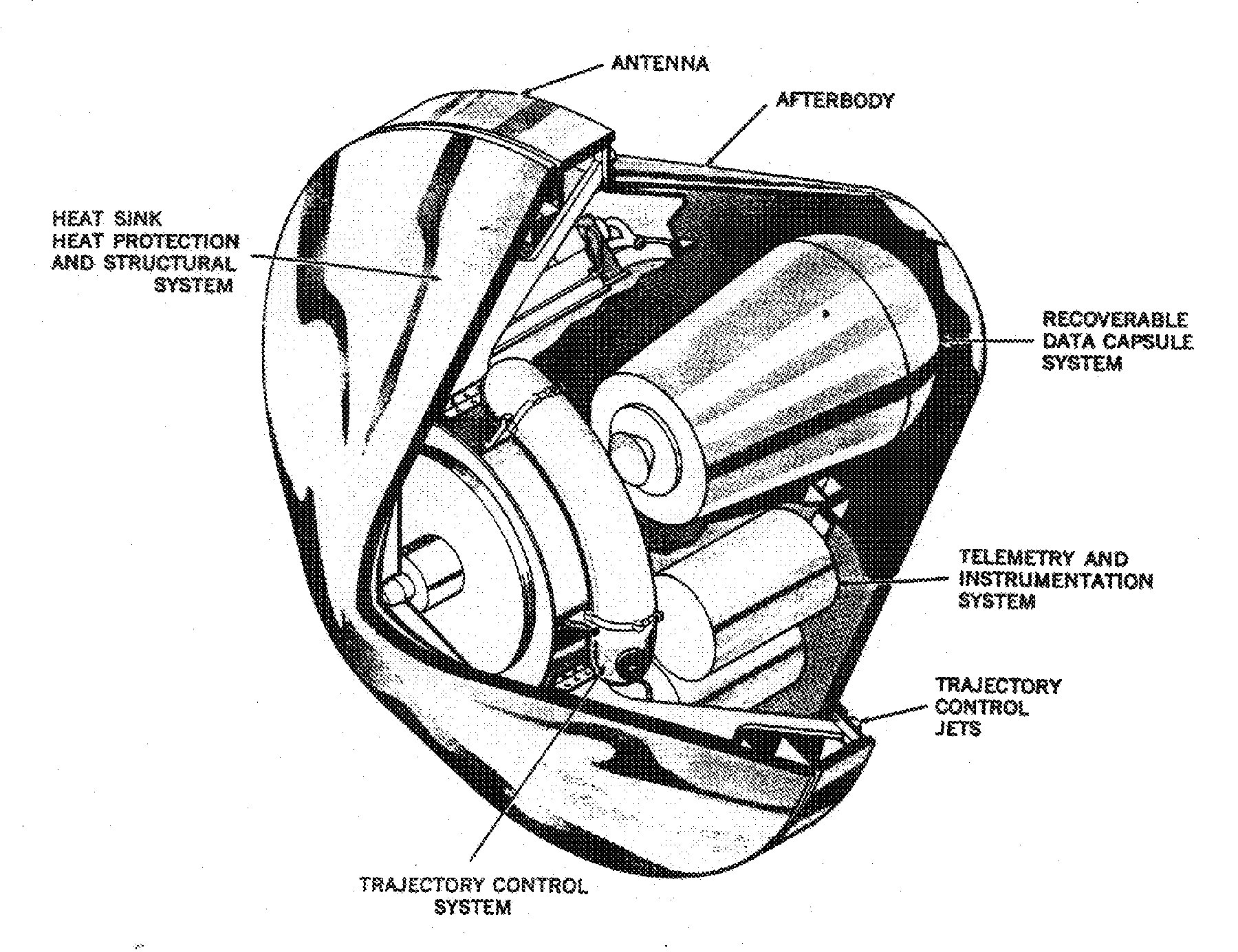
Prototype of the General Electric (USA) Mk-2 Reentry Vehicle (RV), based on blunt body theory.

At the end of World War II, competing Soviet, British, and US military and scientific crews raced to capture technology and trained personnel from the German rocket program at Peenemünde. Russia and Britain had some success, but the United States benefited the most. The US captured a large number of German rocket scientists, including von Braun, and brought them to the United States as part of Operation Paperclip. In America, the same rockets that were designed to rain down on Britain were used instead by scientists as research vehicles for developing the new technology further. The V-2 evolved into the American Redstone rocket, used in the early space program.

In 1946 the Anglo-Australian Joint Project was initiated between the United Kingdom and Australia to provide a Long Range Weapons Establishment, for research and test flights. This continued until 1980.

Independently, in the Soviet Union's space program research continued under the leadership of the chief designer Sergei Korolev. With the help of German technicians, the V-2 was launched and duplicated as the R-1 missile. German designs were abandoned in the late 1940s, and the foreign workers were sent home. A new series of engines built by Glushko and based on inventions of Aleksei Mihailovich Isaev formed the basis of the first ICBM, the R-7. The R-7 launched the first satellite, Sputnik 1, and later Yuri Gagarin, the first man into space, and the first lunar and planetary probes. This rocket is still in use today. These prestigious events attracted the attention of top politicians, along with additional funds for further research.

After the war, rockets were used to study high-altitude conditions, by radio telemetry of temperature and pressure of the atmosphere, detection of cosmic rays, and further research; notably the Bell X-1, the first manned vehicle to break the sound barrier. This continued in the US under von Braun and the others, who were destined to become part of the US scientific community.

One problem that had not been solved was atmospheric reentry. It had been shown that an orbital vehicle easily had enough kinetic energy to vaporize itself, and yet it was known that meteorites can make it down to the ground. The mystery was solved in the US in 1951 when H. Julian Allen and A. J. Eggers Jr. of the National Advisory Committee for Aeronautics (NACA) made the counterintuitive discovery that a blunt shape (high drag) permitted the most effective heat shield. With this type of shape, around 99% of the energy goes into the air rather than the vehicle, and this permitted safe recovery of orbital vehicles.

The Allen and Eggers discovery, initially treated as a military secret, was eventually published in 1958. Blunt body theory made possible the heat shield designs that were embodied in the Mercury, Gemini, Apollo, and Soyuz space capsules, enabling astronauts and cosmonauts to survive the fiery re-entry into Earth's atmosphere. Some spaceplanes such as the Space Shuttle made use of the same theory. At the time the STS was being conceived, Maxime Faget, the Director of Engineering and Development at the Manned Spacecraft Center, was not satisfied with the purely lifting re-entry method (as proposed for the cancelled X-20 "Dyna-Soar"). He designed a space shuttle which operated as a blunt body by entering the atmosphere at an extremely high angle of attack of 40° with the underside facing the direction of flight, creating a large shock wave that would deflect most of the heat around the vehicle instead of into it. The Space Shuttle used a combination of a ballistic entry (blunt body theory) and aerodynamic re-entry; at an altitude of about 122,000 m (400,000 ft), the atmosphere becomes dense enough for the aerodynamic re-entry phase to begin. Throughout re-entry, the Shuttle rolled to change lift direction in a prescribed way, keeping maximum deceleration well below 2 gs. These roll maneuvers allowed the Shuttle to use its lift to steer toward the runway.

=== Cold War ===
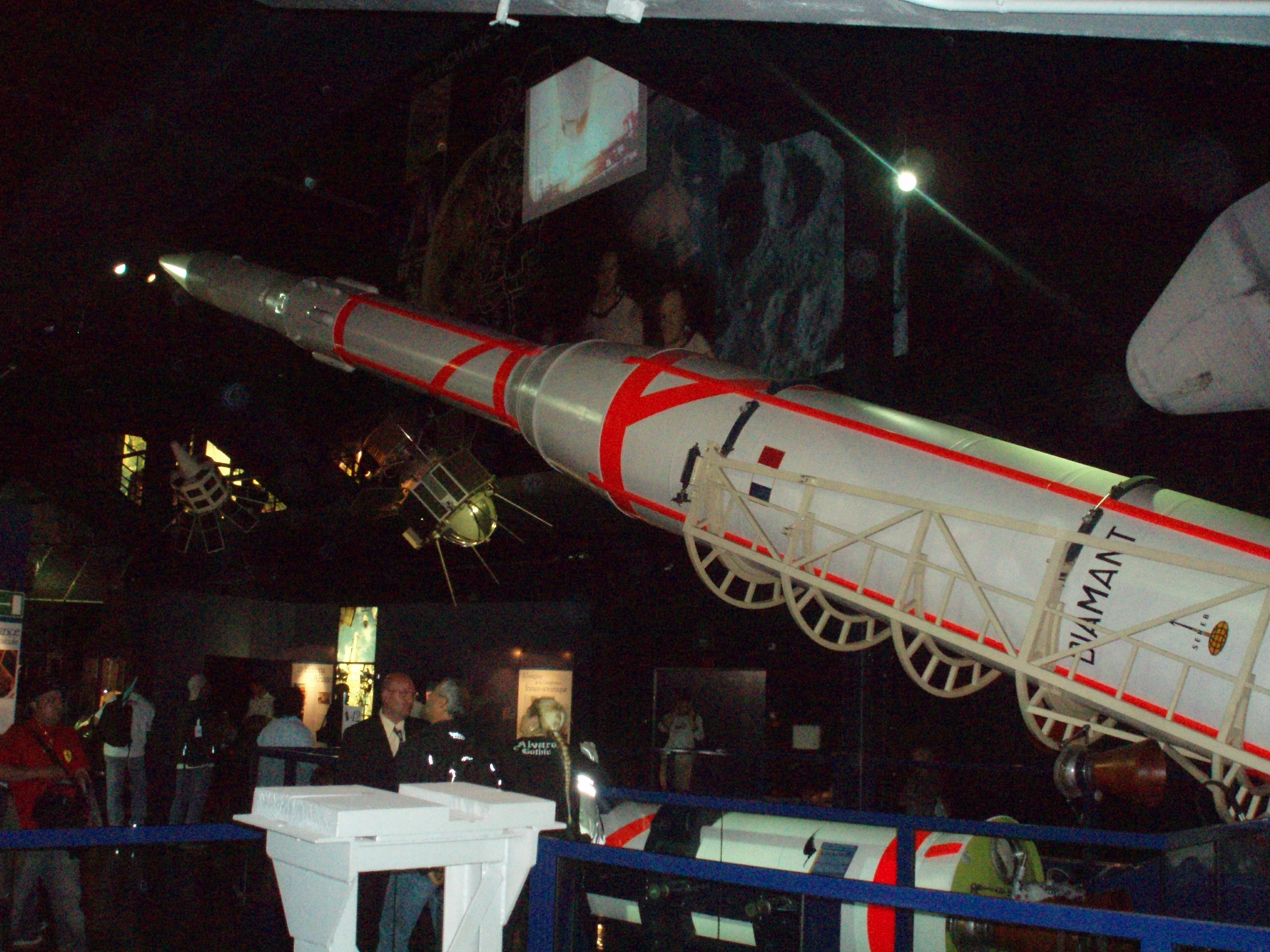
French Diamant rocket, the second French rocket program, developed from 1961

Rockets became extremely important militarily as modern intercontinental ballistic missiles (ICBMs) when it was realized that nuclear weapons carried on a rocket vehicle were essentially impossible for existing defense systems to stop once launched, and launch vehicles such as the R-7, Atlas, and Titan became delivery platforms for these weapons.

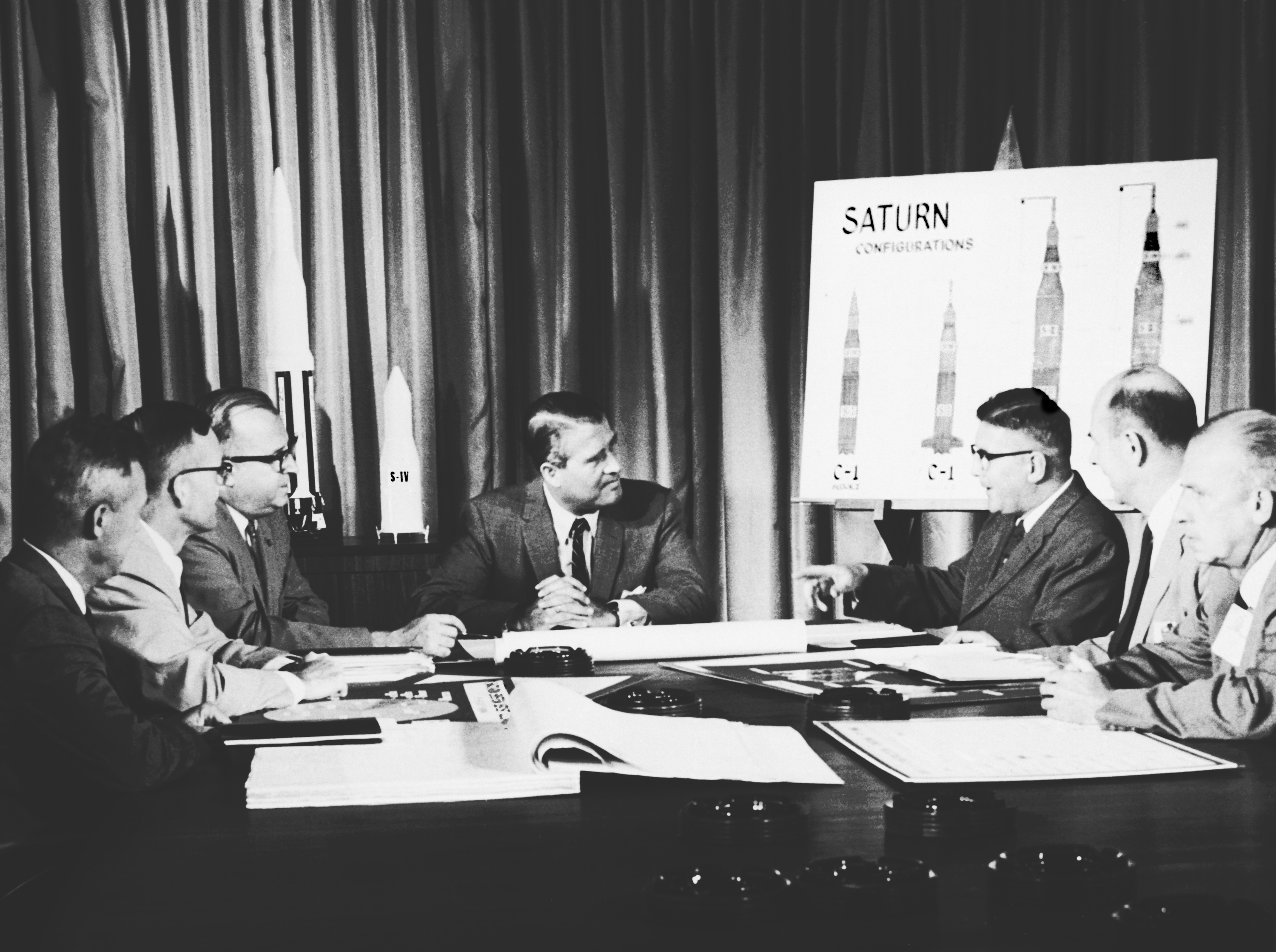
Von Braun's rocket team in 1961

Fueled partly by the Cold War, the 1960s became the decade of rapid development of rocket technology particularly in the Soviet Union (Vostok, Soyuz, Proton) and in the United States (e.g. the X-15 and X-20 Dyna-Soar aircraft). There was also significant research in other countries, such as France, Britain, Japan, Australia, etc., and a growing use of rockets for Space exploration, with pictures returned from the far side of the Moon and uncrewed flights for Mars exploration.

In America, the crewed spaceflight programs, Project Mercury, Project Gemini, and later the Apollo program, culminated in 1969 with the first crewed landing on the Moon using the Saturn V, causing the New York Times to retract its earlier 1920 editorial implying that spaceflight couldn't work:

Further investigation and experimentation have confirmed the findings of Isaac Newton in the 17th century and it is now definitely established that a rocket can function in a vacuum as well as in an atmosphere. The Times regrets the error.

— New York Times, 17 June 1969 - A Correction

In the 1970s, the United States made five more lunar landings before cancelling the Apollo program in 1975. The replacement vehicle, the partially reusable Space Shuttle, was intended to be cheaper, but no large reduction in costs was achieved. Meanwhile, in 1973, the expendable Ariane programme was begun, a launcher that by the year 2000 would capture much of the geosat market.

=== Market competition ===
Since the early 2010s, new private options for obtaining spaceflight services emerged, bringing substantial market competition into the existing launch service provider business. Initially, these market forces have manifest through competitive dynamics among payload transport capabilities at diverse prices having a greater influence on rocket launch purchasing than the traditional political considerations of country of manufacture or the particular national entity using, regulating or licensing the launch service.

Following the advent of spaceflight technology in the late 1950s, space launch services came into being, exclusively by national programs. Later in the 20th century commercial operators became significant customers of launch providers. International competition for the communications satellite payload subset of the launch market was increasingly influenced by commercial considerations. However, even during this period, for both commercial- and government-entity-launched commsats, the launch service providers for these payloads used launch vehicles built to government specifications, and with state-provided development funding exclusively.

In the early 2010s, privately developed launch vehicle systems and space launch service offerings emerged. Companies now faced economic incentives rather than the principally political incentives of the earlier decades. The space launch business experienced a dramatic lowering of per-unit prices along with the addition of entirely new capabilities, bringing about a new phase of competition in the space launch market.

== See also ==
- Jet aircraft
- Rocket
- Rocket engine

== Bibliography ==
- Adle, Chahryar (2003), History of Civilizations of Central Asia: Development in Contrast: from the Sixteenth to the Mid-Nineteenth Century
- Ágoston, Gábor (2008), Guns for the Sultan: Military Power and the Weapons Industry in the Ottoman Empire, Cambridge University Press, ISBN 978-0-521-60391-1
- Agrawal, Jai Prakash (2010), High Energy Materials: Propellants, Explosives and Pyrotechnics, Wiley-VCH
- Andrade, Tonio (2016), The Gunpowder Age: China, Military Innovation, and the Rise of the West in World History, Princeton University Press, ISBN 978-0-691-13597-7.
- Allen, Julian H.; Eggers, A.J. Jr. (January 1, 1958). A study of the motion and aerodynamic heating of ballistic missiles entering the earth's atmosphere at high supersonic speeds (Report). NASA.
- Arnold, Thomas (2001), The Renaissance at War, Cassell & Co, ISBN 0-304-35270-5
- Benton, Captain James G. (2003) [1862]. A Course of Instruction in Ordnance and Gunnery (2 ed.). West Point, New York: Thomas Publications. ISBN 1-57747-079-6.
- Béon, Yves (1997). Planet Dora. Westview Press. ISBN 0-8133-3272-9..
- Brown, G. I. (1998), The Big Bang: A History of Explosives, Sutton Publishing, ISBN 0-7509-1878-0.
- Buchanan, Brenda J., ed. (2006), Gunpowder, Explosives and the State: A Technological History, Aldershot: Ashgate, ISBN 0-7546-5259-9
- Burrows, William E. (1998). This New Ocean: The Story of the First Space Age. New York: Random House. ISBN 978-0-679-44521-0.
- Chase, Kenneth (2003), Firearms: A Global History to 1700, Cambridge University Press, ISBN 0-521-82274-2.
- Clary, David A. (2003). Rocket Man: Robert H. Goddard and the Birth of the Space Age. Hachette Books. ISBN 0786868171.
- Cocroft, Wayne (2000), Dangerous Energy: The archaeology of gunpowder and military explosives manufacture, Swindon: English Heritage, ISBN 1-85074-718-0
- Cornwell, John (2003). Hitler's Scientists: Science, War and the Devil's Pact. Viking. ISBN 0670030759.
- Cowley, Robert (1993), Experience of War, Laurel.
- Cressy, David (2013), Saltpeter: The Mother of Gunpowder, Oxford University Press
- Crosby, Alfred W. (2002), Throwing Fire: Projectile Technology Through History, Cambridge University Press, ISBN 0-521-79158-8.
- Curtis, W. S. (2014), Long Range Shooting: A Historical Perspective, WeldenOwen.
- Earl, Brian (1978), Cornish Explosives, Cornwall: The Trevithick Society, ISBN 0-904040-13-5.
- Easton, S. C. (1952), Roger Bacon and His Search for a Universal Science: A Reconsideration of the Life and Work of Roger Bacon in the Light of His Own Stated Purposes, Basil Blackwell
- Ebrey, Patricia B. (1999), The Cambridge Illustrated History of China, Cambridge University Press, ISBN 0-521-43519-6
- Elder, Donald C.; James, George S. (1997). "History of Rocketry and Astronautics". Proceedings of the Thirty-First History Symposium of the International Academy of Astronautics. Turin Italy: American Astronautical Society. ISBN 9780877035190.
- Esnault-Pelterie, Robert (1913). "Considérations sur les résultats d'un allégement indéfini des moteurs". J. Phys. Theor. Appl. 3 (1): 218–230. doi:10.1051/jphystap:019130030021800.
- Grant, R.G. (2011), Battle at Sea: 3,000 Years of Naval Warfare, DK Publishing.
- Hadden, R. Lee. 2005. "Confederate Boys and Peter Monkeys." Armchair General. January 2005. Adapted from a talk given to the Geological Society of America on March 25, 2004.
- Gainor, Chris (2008). To a Distant Day: The Rocket Pioneers. University of Nebraska Press. ISBN 9780803222588.
- Goddard, Robert (1919). A Method of Reaching Extreme Altitudes (PDF). Smithsonian Institution.
- Goddard, Robert H. (2002). Rockets: Two Classic Papers. AIAA. ISBN 0486425371.
- Hansen, James R. (1986). Engineer in Charge (Report). NASA.
- Harding, Richard (1999), Seapower and Naval Warfare, 1650-1830, UCL Press Limited
- al-Hassan, Ahmad Y. (2001), "Potassium Nitrate in Arabic and Latin Sources", History of Science and Technology in Islam, archived from the original on 20 May 2019.
- al-Hassan, Ahmad (2003), "Gunpowder, Composition for Rockets and Cannon in Arabic Military Treatises in the Thirteenth and Fourteenth Centuries", Icon, 9, JSTOR: 1–30, JSTOR 23790667.
- Hobson, John M. (2004), The Eastern Origins of Western Civilisation, Cambridge University Press.
- Houchin, Roy (2006). U.S. Hypersonic Research and Development: The Rise and Fall of Dyna-Soar, 1944–1963. London: Routledge. ISBN 0-415-36281-4.
- Hunt, Linda (1991). Secret Agenda: The United States Government, Nazi Scientists, and Project Paperclip, 1945 to 1990. New York: St.Martin's Press. ISBN 978-0-312-05510-3.
- Johnson, Norman Gardner. "explosive". Encyclopædia Britannica. Chicago: Encyclopædia Britannica Online.
- Kelly, Jack (2004), Gunpowder: Alchemy, Bombards, & Pyrotechnics: The History of the Explosive that Changed the World, Basic Books, ISBN 0-465-03718-6.
- Khan, Iqtidar Alam (1996), "Coming of Gunpowder to the Islamic World and North India: Spotlight on the Role of the Mongols", Journal of Asian History, 30: 41–5.
- Khan, Iqtidar Alam (2004), Gunpowder and Firearms: Warfare in Medieval India, Oxford University Press
- Khan, Iqtidar Alam (2008), Historical Dictionary of Medieval India, The Scarecrow Press, Inc., ISBN 978-0-8108-5503-8
- Kinard, Jeff (2007), Artillery An Illustrated History of its Impact
- Konstam, Angus (2002), Renaissance War Galley 1470-1590, Osprey Publisher Ltd..
- Liang, Jieming (2006), Chinese Siege Warfare: Mechanical Artillery & Siege Weapons of Antiquity, Singapore: Leong Kit Meng, ISBN 981-05-5380-3
- Lidin, Olaf G. (2002), Tanegashima – The Arrival of Europe in Japan, Nordic Inst of Asian Studies, ISBN 8791114128
- Lorge, Peter (2005), Warfare in China to 1600, Routledge
- Lorge, Peter A. (2008), The Asian Military Revolution: from Gunpowder to the Bomb, Cambridge University Press, ISBN 978-0-521-60954-8
- Lu, Gwei-Djen (1988), "The Oldest Representation of a Bombard", Technology and Culture, 29 (3): 594–605, doi:10.2307/3105275, JSTOR 3105275, S2CID 112733319
- McLachlan, Sean (2010), Medieval Handgonnes
- McNeill, William Hardy (1992), The Rise of the West: A History of the Human Community, University of Chicago Press.
- Morillo, Stephen (2008), War in World History: Society, Technology, and War from Ancient Times to the Present, Volume 1, To 1500, McGraw-Hill, ISBN 978-0-07-052584-9
- Needham, Joseph (1980), Science & Civilisation in China, vol. 5 pt. 4, Cambridge University Press, ISBN 0-521-08573-X
- Needham, Joseph (1986), Science & Civilisation in China, vol. V:7: The Gunpowder Epic, Cambridge University Press, ISBN 0-521-30358-3.
- Nicolle, David (1990), The Mongol Warlords: Genghis Khan, Kublai Khan, Hulegu, Tamerlane
- Nolan, Cathal J. (2006), The Age of Wars of Religion, 1000–1650: an Encyclopedia of Global Warfare and Civilization, Vol 1, A-K, vol. 1, Westport CT: Greenwood Press, ISBN 0-313-33733-0
- Norris, John (2003), Early Gunpowder Artillery: 1300–1600, Marlborough: The Crowood Press.
- Partington, J. R. (1960), A History of Greek Fire and Gunpowder, Cambridge, UK: W. Heffer & Sons.
- Partington, J. R. (1999), A History of Greek Fire and Gunpowder, Baltimore: Johns Hopkins University Press, ISBN 0-8018-5954-9
- Patrick, John Merton (1961), Artillery and warfare during the thirteenth and fourteenth centuries, Utah State University Press.
- Pauly, Roger (2004), Firearms: The Life Story of a Technology, Greenwood Publishing Group.
- Perrin, Noel (1979), Giving up the Gun, Japan's reversion to the Sword, 1543–1879, Boston: David R. Godine, ISBN 0-87923-773-2
- Petzal, David E. (2014), The Total Gun Manual (Canadian edition), WeldonOwen.
- Phillips, Henry Prataps (2016), The History and Chronology of Gunpowder and Gunpowder Weapons (c.1000 to 1850), Notion Press
- Purton, Peter (2010), A History of the Late Medieval Siege, 1200–1500, Boydell Press, ISBN 978-1-84383-449-6
- Robins, Benjamin (1742), New Principles of Gunnery
- Rose, Susan (2002), Medieval Naval Warfare 1000-1500, Routledge
- Roy, Kaushik (2015), Warfare in Pre-British India, Routledge
- Schefter, James (1999). The Race: The uncensored story of how America beat Russia to the Moon. New York: Doubleday. ISBN 0-385-49253-7.
- Siddiqi, Asif A. (2003). Sputnik and the Soviet Space Challenge. Gainesville: University Press of Florida. ISBN 0-8130-2627-X.
- Schmidtchen, Volker (1977a), "Riesengeschütze des 15. Jahrhunderts. Technische Höchstleistungen ihrer Zeit", Technikgeschichte 44 (2): 153–173 (153–157)
- Schmidtchen, Volker (1977b), "Riesengeschütze des 15. Jahrhunderts. Technische Höchstleistungen ihrer Zeit", Technikgeschichte 44 (3): 213–237 (226–228)
- Stocker, Jeremy (2004). Britain and Ballistic Missile Defence, 1942-2002. Psychology Press. ISBN 9780714656960.
- Tran, Nhung Tuyet (2006), Viêt Nam Borderless Histories, University of Wisconsin Press.
- Turnbull, Stephen (2003), Fighting Ships Far East (2: Japan and Korea Ad 612-1639, Osprey Publishing, ISBN 1-84176-478-7
- Urbanski, Tadeusz (1967), Chemistry and Technology of Explosives, vol. III, New York: Pergamon Press.
- Van Riper, A. Bowdoin (2004). Rockets and Missiles: The Life Story of a Technology. Greenwood Press. ISBN 0313327955.
- Villalon, L. J. Andrew (2008), The Hundred Years War (part II): Different Vistas, Brill Academic Pub, ISBN 978-90-04-16821-3
- Wagner, John A. (2006), The Encyclopedia of the Hundred Years War, Westport CT: Greenwood Press, ISBN 0-313-32736-X
- Watson, Peter (2006), Ideas: A History of Thought and Invention, from Fire to Freud, Harper Perennial (2006), ISBN 0-06-093564-2
- Willbanks, James H. (2004), Machine guns: an illustrated history of their impact, ABC-CLIO, Inc.
- Zaloga, Steven (2003). V-2 Ballistic Missile, 1942–52. New Vanguard. Oxford: Osprey Publishing. ISBN 978-1-84176-541-9.
