= Kramarov =

Kramarov may refer to:

- Grigory Kramarov, Bolshevik advocate of space flight
- Savely Kramarov (1934–1995), Soviet/Russian actor
- Kramarov (crater)
