= Pierazzo (crater) =

Crater on the Moon

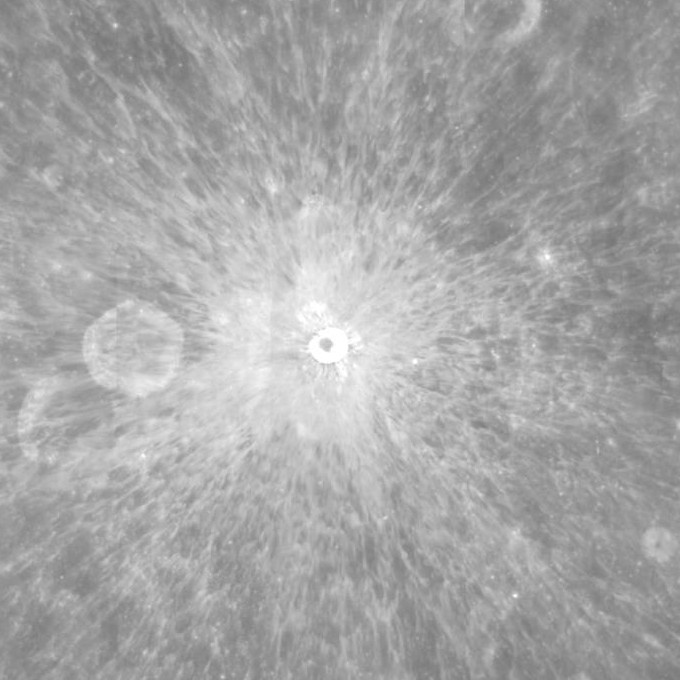
- Mosaic of Clementine images
- Coordinates: 3.3°N 100.24°W
- Diameter: 9.29 km
- Depth: Unknown
- Colongitude: 100° at sunrise
- Eponym: Elisabetta Pierazzo

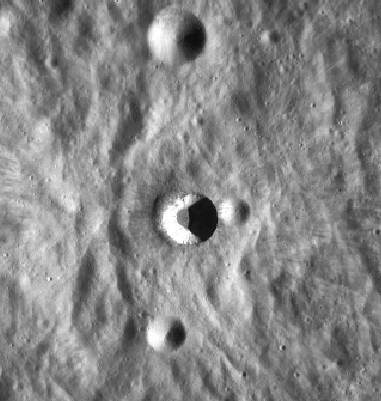
LRO image at a much lower sun angle than above

Pierazzo is a small lunar impact crater on the far side of the Moon. It is located within the north-northwestern section of the immense skirt of ejecta that surrounds the Mare Orientale impact basin. To the south is the Montes Cordillera mountain ring. To the west is the crater Lents.

== Appearance ==
This crater produced a broad, wispy ray system that extends for more than 100 km in all directions. The ejecta blanket contains multiple lobate impact melt flows, that extend to over 40 km from the centre of the 9.3 km diameter crater, and that appear dark in contrast to the surrounding material.

== Name ==
The crater was named by the IAU in 2015, after Italian planetary scientist Elisabetta Pierazzo. Pierazzo was herself a specialist in impact cratering and the associated production of impact melt.

The view of crater Pierazzo and its bright ray system was captured by human eyes during the lunar mission of Artemis II in April 2026.
