= Elisabetta Pierazzo =

Scientist

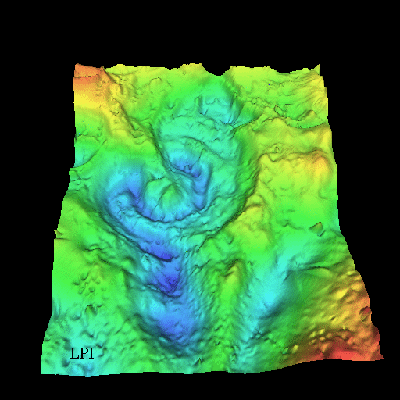
3D model of the Chicxulub impact.

Elisabetta "Betty" Pierazzo (1963-2011) was a senior scientist at the Planetary Science Institute from 2002 to 2011. Pierazzo specialized in impact cratering. She was also an adjunct professor at the University of Arizona.

== Life and career ==
Elisabetta was born in Noale, Italy on July 4, 1963, to mother Maria Scattolin and father Nerino Pierazzo. In 1989, Pierazzo moved from her hometown to Tucson, Arizona and in 1990 began attending graduate school at the Department of Planetary Sciences division of the University of Arizona. She went on to receive her PhD in 1997 from the University of Arizona and was awarded the Gerard P. Kuiper Memorial Award for her work. From 1997 to 2002, Pierazzo stayed at the University of Arizona and served as a Research Associate. In 2007, Pierazzo married her husband Keith Powell. The same year, Pierazzo was promoted from research scientist to senior scientist at PSI.

In 2002, Pierazzo began work at the Planetary Science Institute as a research scientist, where she studied worked on meteoritic impacting modeling concerning early Earth, Mars, and Europa. Notably, Pierazzo worked on providing information about the Chicxulub impact, which is said to have killed the dinosaurs. In 2009, the scientist was featured in a three-part National Geographic special entitled "Known Universe", where she was interviewed about impact modeling at the Barringer meteor crater in Arizona. During this time, Pierazzo also served as adjunct faculty at the University of Arizona Lunar and Planetary Laboratory, where she taught Astrobiology. Pierazzo went on to coauthor a book entitled "Impact Cratering: Processes and Products" with coauthor Dr. Gordon Osinski. The book was published in 2012.

== Death and afterward ==
Pierazzo died of leiomyosarcoma of the uterus, a very rare cancer, on May 15, 2011, at the age of 47. A main-belt asteroid that was discovered in 1994 was dedicated posthumously to Pierazzo. In 2013, the Planetary Science Institute established an International Student Travel award in Pierazzo's honor, where students can apply to receive up to $2,000 in funding to help students in the United States pursue graduate work abroad, or American graduate students working abroad return. Additionally, a crater on the Moon was dedicated to the scientist in 2015. Finally, a school in Pierazzo's hometown of Noale was dedicated to her. The school serves as both an elementary and a middle school, teaching 6-9 and 10-12 year old students.
