= William Hale (British inventor) =

British inventor and rocket pioneer (1797–1870)

- Born: 21 October 1797; Colchester, Essex
- Died: 30 March 1870 (aged 72); London, England
- Known for: Invention of the rotary rocket

William Hale (21 October 1797 – 30 March 1870), was a British inventor and rocket pioneer.

== Biography ==
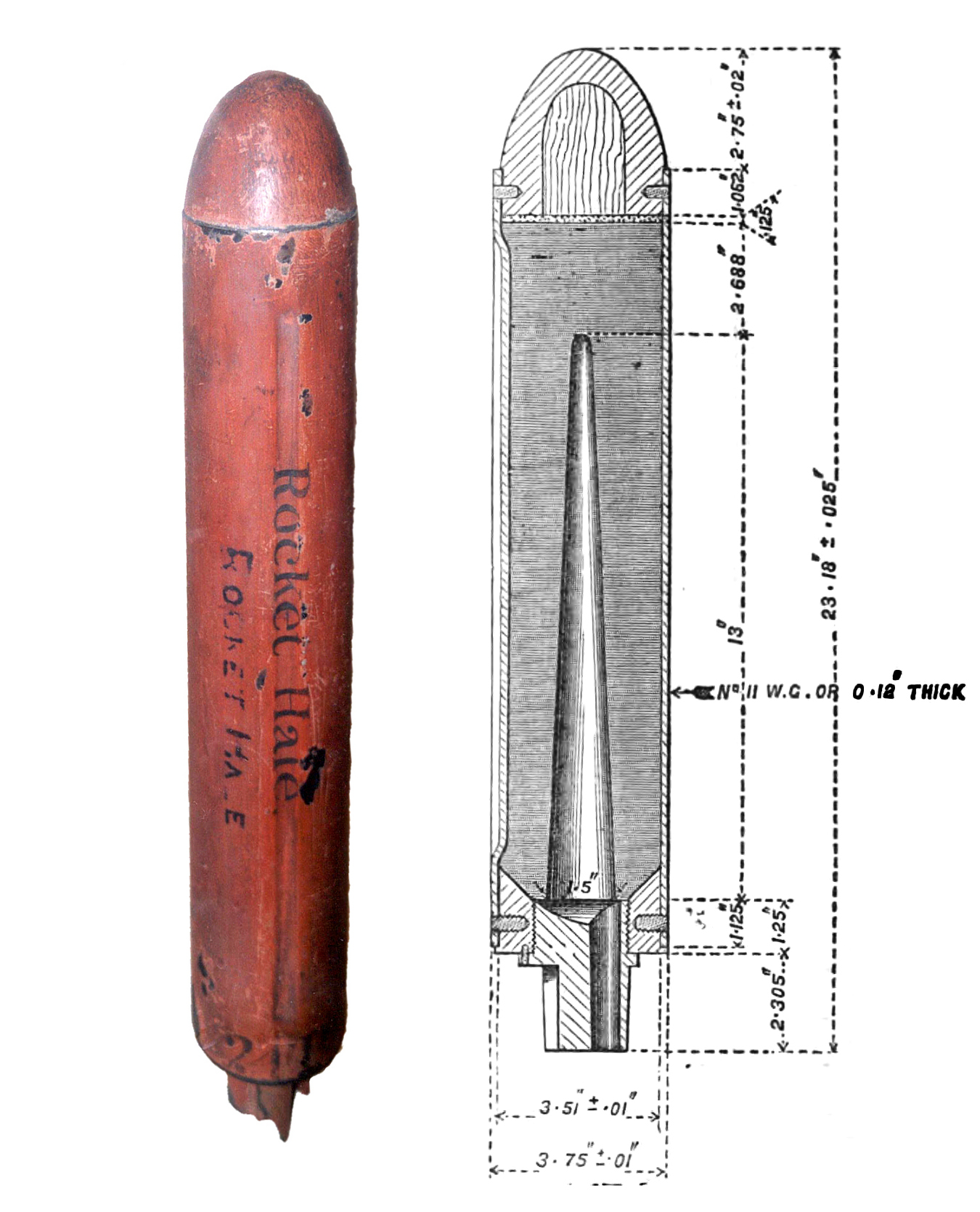
Hale rocket

Hale was born in Colchester, England in 1797. He was self-taught although his grandfather, the educator William Cole, is believed to have tutored him. By 1827 he had obtained his first patent; he also won a first class Gold Medal of the Royal Society of Arts in Paris for his paper on ship propulsion using an early form of jet propulsion.

Hale was inducted into the International Space Hall of Fame in 2004.

== Rocketry ==
In 1844, Hale patented a new form of rotary rocket that improved on the earlier Congreve rocket design. Hale removed the guidestick from the design, instead vectoring part of the thrust through canted exhaust holes to provide rotation of the rocket, which improved its stability in flight.

These rockets could weigh up to 60 pounds (27 kg) and were noted for their glare and noise on ignition.

Hale rockets were first used by the United States Army in the Mexican–American War of 1846–1848. Although the British Army experimented with Hale rockets during the Crimean War of 1853–1856, they did not officially adopt them until 1867.

They were used from then on in most of the major Victorian campaigns including Abyssinia, Ashanti, 9th Cape Frontier War, Anglo-Zulu War, Tel-el-Kebir and 1st Transvaal Rebellion as well as many smaller punitive expeditions such as the storming of Mwele in 1895. Both the 9-pr and 24-pr adopted by the British Army were highly effective when used in their intended role. It is a commonly held misbelief that they were inaccurate, ineffective and of more danger to the user than the enemy. This is not true. The Hale rocket and its associated equipment was a highly effective weapons system.

Unfortunately the Hale rocket adopted a poor reputation from its predecessor the Congreve rocket. There were accidents with rockets just as there were accidents with all other black powder weapons of the time. Muzzle loading artillery exploded, pistols misfired or blew up, early breach loading artillery had a tendency to fire from both ends and defective cartridges in rifles caused injuries to the user rather than the enemy.

And let us not forget the human element. Many accidents were usually not down to the design of the rocket at all but incorrect storage or use by the operator in the field. If, for example, the rear crutch on the rocket trough was not kept cool during prolonged firing, a rocket could prematurely explode before it left the launcher. Explosions during construction at the munitions factory at Woolwich were also due to human error and cost cutting by the military in the design and development on later versions led to unnecessary and sometimes tragic incidents occurring during training exercises.

Of the 14,000 Mk III 24-pr rockets produced, only one is known to have burst, and that had been on a long journey to the Gold Coast in West Africa and back.

During the Anglo-Zulu War of 1879 when deployed correctly the Hale rocket was extremely successful and, apart from Rorke's Drift could be found on all of the battlefields during that campaign. The Zulus had a great fear of them as this account by a soldier of the 1/13th Regiment writes about the battle of Khambula in March 1879. "We varied the programme by occasionally firing a few Hale's 9-pounder rockets at them. I thoroughly believed these rockets frightened them more than anything else"

The Hales rocket was an extremely successful weapon, feared by its enemies across the Empire.

Rocket technology was later deployed by both sides during the Paraguayan War.

In the American Civil War of 1861–1865 the Union forces deployed the Hale rocket launcher, a metal tube that fired 7-and-10-inch (18 and 25 cm) long spin-stabilized rockets up to 2,000 yards (1.8 km). It was only generally used by the U.S. Navy.

== Bibliography ==
- Birbeck, Kate. Rocket Batteries and other Artillery of the Anglo-Zulu War 1879. Dreadnought Publishing 2025. ISBN 978-1-9999587-9-4
- Frank H. Winter, The First Golden Age of Rocketry: Congreve and Hale Rockets of the Nineteenth Century, (Washington and London: Smithsonian Institution Press, 1990), p. 321 illus. ISBN 0-87474-987-5
