= Kramarov (crater) =

Crater on the Moon

- Coordinates: 2.3°S 98.8°W
- Diameter: 20 km
- Depth: Unknown
- Colongitude: 99° at sunrise
- Eponym: G. M. Kramarov

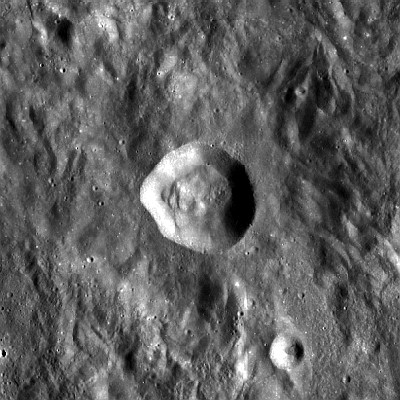
picture of Kramarov taken by Hubble Space Telescope

Kramarov is a small lunar impact crater that is located on the far side of the Moon. It lies just beyond the western limb, at the far edge of the region that is brought into view during favorable librations. The crater is situated in the northern part of the Montes Cordillera, the outer ring of the mountains that surround Mare Orientale.

In the past this crater was designated Lents K, a satellite of Lents which lies to the northwest, before being named by the IAU. Just to the southeast is another satellite crater, Lents J. Kramarov is a circular, bowl-shaped crater that lies amidst a region of rugged terrain. The inner walls slope down to a wide interior floor that occupies about two-thirds the total diameter of the crater. It is otherwise an undistinguished formation that has suffered little erosion and has no features of particular interest.
