= Emil Lenz =

Russian physicist (1804–1865)

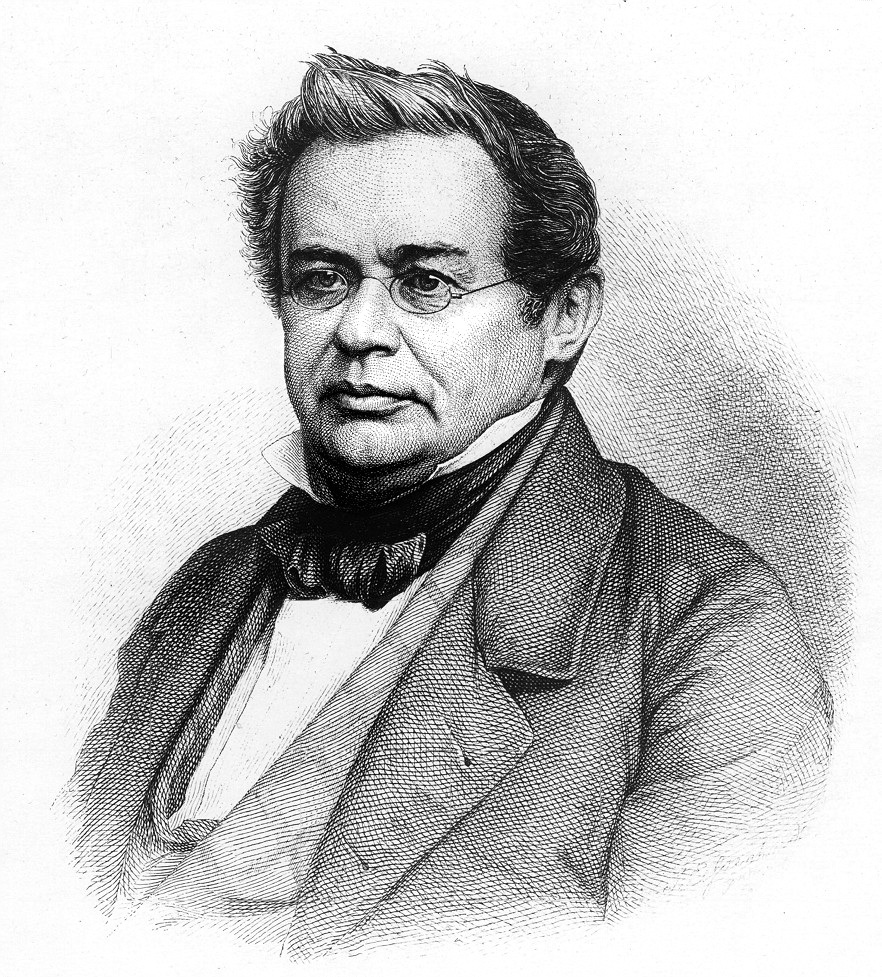
- Born: Heinrich Friedrich Emil Lenz; 24 February 1804; Dorpat, Governorate of Livonia, Russian Empire
- Died: 10 February 1865 (aged 60); Rome, Papal States
- Education: Imperial University of Dorpat
- Known for: Formulating Lenz's law (1834)
- Scientific career
- Fields: Physics
- Workplaces: Saint Petersburg Imperial University (1840–1865)

Heinrich Friedrich Emil Lenz (German: [ˈeːmɪl ˈlɛnts]; also Emil Khristianovich Lenz; Russian: Эми́лий Христиа́нович Ленц; 24 February [O.S. 12 February] 1804 – 10 February [O.S. 29 January] 1865), usually cited as Emil Lenz or Heinrich Lenz in some countries, was a Russian physicist of Baltic German descent who is most noted for formulating Lenz's law in electrodynamics in 1834.

== Biography ==
Lenz was born in Dorpat (nowadays Tartu, Estonia), at that time in the Governorate of Livonia in the Russian Empire. After completing his secondary education in 1820, Lenz studied chemistry and physics at the Imperial University of Dorpat. He traveled with the navigator Otto von Kotzebue on his third expedition around the world from 1823 to 1826. On the voyage Lenz studied climatic conditions and the physical properties of seawater. The results were published in "Memoirs of the St. Petersburg Academy of Sciences" (1831).

After the voyage, Lenz began working at the University of St. Petersburg, Russia, where he later served as the Dean of Mathematics and Physics from 1840 to 1863 and was Rector from 1863 until his death in 1865. Lenz also taught at the Petrischule in 1830 and 1831, and at the Mikhailovskaya Artillery Academy.

Lenz had begun studying electromagnetism in 1831. Besides the law named in his honor, Lenz also independently discovered Joule's law in 1842; to honor his efforts on the problem, it is also given the name the "Joule–Lenz law," named also for James Prescott Joule.

Lenz eagerly participated in development of the electroplating technology, invented by his friend and colleague Moritz von Jacobi. In 1839, Lenz produced several medallions using electrotyping. Along with the electrotyped relief produced by Jacobi the same year, these were the first instances of galvanoplastic sculpture.

Lenz died in Rome, after suffering a cerebral haemorrhage.

In Lenz's honor, it is customary to use the symbol $L$ for inductance.

A lunar crater on the far side of the Moon is named after him.

== See also ==
- List of Baltic German scientists

== Sources ==
- "Ленц, Эмилий Христианович" . Brockhaus and Efron Encyclopedic Dictionary (in Russian). 1906.
