= Lents (crater) =

Crater on the Moon

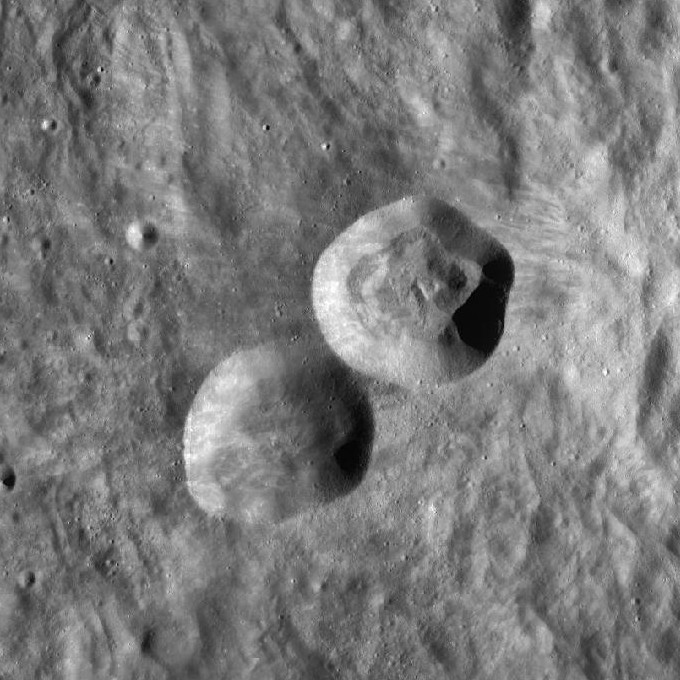
- LRO WAC image with Lents below left of center and Lents C above right of center
- Coordinates: 2.8°N 102.1°W
- Diameter: 21 km
- Depth: Unknown
- Colongitude: 102° at sunrise
- Eponym: Heinrich F. E. Lenz

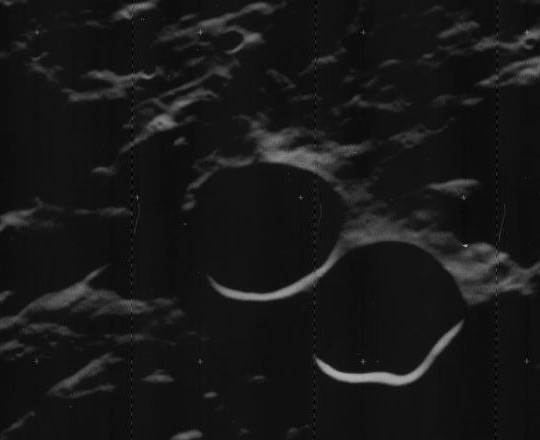
Oblique Lunar Orbiter 5 image with Lents at center and Lents C below right, facing west

Lents is a small lunar impact crater on the far side of the Moon. It is located within the north-northwestern section of the immense skirt of ejecta that surrounds the Mare Orientale impact basin. To the south is the Montes Cordillera mountain ring, and to the north-northeast is the damaged crater Elvey.

This is a bowl-shaped formation with an interior floor that is about half the diameter of the crater. Attached to the northeastern exterior of Lents is the satellite crater Lents C, a feature of roughly the same dimension. Slightly more than a crater diameter to the east of Lents C is Pierazzo, which produced a broad, wispy ray system that extends for more than 100 km in all directions. The ray material from this impact lies across both Lents C and Lents, reaching as far north as Elvey.

On some maps, Lents is called Lenz.

== Satellite craters ==
By convention these features are identified on lunar maps by placing the letter on the side of the crater midpoint that is closest to Lents.

Lents	Latitude	Longitude	Diameter
C	3.3° N	101.6° W	23 km
J	3.7° S	97.3° W	16 km

The following crater has been renamed by the IAU.

- Lents K — See Kramarov.
