= Frank H. Winter =

American historian and writer

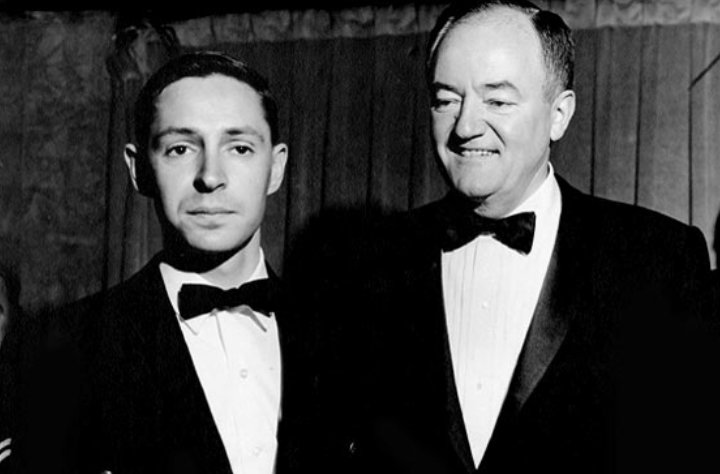
Frank H. Winter with then US Vice President Hubert H. Humphrey, on 16 March 1966, in Washington, D.C. The occasion was the Ninth Annual Robert H. Goddard Dinner, sponsored by the National Space Club, during which Winter was presented with the Robert H. Goddard Historical Essay Award.

Frank H. Winter (born 1942) is an American historian and writer. He is the retired Curator of Rocketry of the National Air and Space Museum (NASM) of the Smithsonian Institution of Washington, D.C. Winter is also an internationally recognized historian of rocketry and spaceflight and the author of several landmark books besides numerous articles and papers on these topics.

== Early life ==
Winter was born in London, England, in 1942. He emigrated to the United States with his family when he was 9 years old. He became a United States citizen in 1960, and attended public schools in New York City and Los Angeles.

== Military ==
He served in the U.S. Air Force from 1964 to 1968, and for his last two years of duty was reassigned to Morón Air Force Base, near Seville, Spain, and later to Torrejon Air Force Base, near Madrid, Spain. At both bases he worked as a military journalist, including the position as the feature editor for the Torrejon base newspaper. Winter won a Robert H. Goddard Essay Award from the National Space Club in 1965, while still in the Air Force.

== Career ==
His essay, "A Case Study in Challenge and Response: Danish Rocketry in the 19th Century," was published in the 1966 July issue of the Aerospace Historian, the quarterly of the Air Force Historical Foundation. He won a second Goddard essay award later, in 1970. After separating from the service, he continued his formal education at the University of Maryland, earning a BA in history, cum laude. Winter joined the National Air and Space Museum (NASM) in 1968 as a temporary part-time employee. In 1970 he became a full-time employee as a historical research clerk. From 1971 he has presented scholarly papers on the history of rocketry at International Astronautical Federation congresses, at International Congresses of the History of Science, and at other similar gatherings.

In 1980 he became an historian at the museum. Then, in 1984, he was named the Curator of Rocketry, a position he held until 2007 when he retired. In 1996 Winter presented the American Astronautical Society's first Goddard Memorial Lecture and received a medal for it. The lecture was titled, "Robert H. Goddard – The Man and His Achievements."

In 2002, he and Kerrie Dougherty, then the Powerhouse Museum curator of space technology in Sydney, Australia, jointly won the "International Partnership Among Museums scholarship" of the American Association of Museums. Thus, he sojourned in Australia in 2003, with related journeys to Thailand and Laos, conducting research toward the planned Powerhouse exhibit, Fire Dragons: 1,000 Years of Rocketry in Asia.

== Selected bibliography ==
=== As author ===
- Prelude to the Space Age: The Rocket Societies 1924-1940. Washington City: Smithsonian Institution Press Published for National Air and Space Museum, Smithsonian Institution. 1983. ISBN 978-0-87474-963-2.
- Comet Watch: The Return of Halley's Comet. Minneapolis, Minnesota: Lerner Publications. 1986. ISBN 978-0-82251-5791.
- The First Golden Age of Rocketry: Congreve and Hale Rockets of the Nineteenth Century. Washington, D.C.: Smithsonian Institution Press. 1991. ISBN 978-0-87474-987-8.
- Rockets into Space. Cambridge, Massachusetts: Harvard University Press. 1991. ISBN 978-0674776609.
- Superior -- Land, Sea, Air, and Space. Stevens Point, Wisconsin: Superior Tube Company, Inc. (Konecki & Konecki, LLC). 2013. ISBN 978-1-56852-793-2.

=== As co-author ===
- van der Linden, Robert F. (July 1, 2003). 100 years of flight: a chronology of aerospace history, 1903-2003. Reston, Va: American Institute of Aeronautics and Astronautics. ISBN 978-1563475627.

In addition, he is the co-author, with Robert F. van der Linden, of the column "Out of the Past" that has appeared in the magazine Aerospace America (formally, Astronautics & Aeronautics) since September 1972.

- Pisano, Dominick A.; van der Linden, F. Robert (May 1, 2006). Chuck Yeager and the Bell X-1 — Breaking the Sound Barrier. Washington, D.C. New York: Smithsonian National Air and Space Museum, Harry N. Abrams, Inc. ISBN 978-0810955356.
- Ordway, III, Frederick I (2015). Pioneering American rocketry: the Reaction Motors, Inc. (RMI) story, 1941-1972. San Diego, California: Univelt, Inc. ISBN 978-0-87703-620-3.

== Societies ==
- Fellow of the British Interplanetary Society
- Member of the International Academy of Astronautics
- Member of the history committee of
  - American Astronautical Society
  - American Institute of Aeronautics and Astronautics

== Retirement ==
He retired in 2007 after 39 years as a Smithsonian employee. He continues to help the Space History Department of the National Air and Space Museum as a curator emeritus. He lives in Virginia with his wife, Fe Dulce Rosal Winter, and daughter, Elaine Roxane Winter, while his son, Ron Winter, resides in Los Angeles. Winter continues to be very active as a freelance writer and museum consultant specializing in astronautics history and histories of companies in other fields. In addition, he continues to present history papers at International Astronautical Federation congresses as well as to work on further books.

== Sources ==
- Griffith (2000). The Griffith Observer. Vol. 64. Griffith Observatory. "Winter charmed the judges of the National Space Club two more times with prizewinning Goddard Essays, and he received the first Goddard Memorial Lecture Medal ever presented by the American Astronautical Society."
