= Society for Studies of Interplanetary Travel =

The Society for Studies of Interplanetary Travel (OIMS, Russian: Общество изучения межпланетных сообщений) was founded in Moscow in May 1924, as a spin-off from a military science society at the Zhukovsky Airforce Academy. Chaired by Grigory Kramarov, it counted 200 charter members, including prominent Soviet experts in space-exploration and rocketry such as Konstantin Tsiolkovsky, Fridrikh Tsander, and Vladimir Vetchinkin. The society facilitated discussions among engineers and educators on space travel and organized public educational events.

OIMS hosted a famous public debate on October 4, 1924, to discuss Robert Goddard's proposal to launch a rocket to the Moon.

The society lasted for only about one year.
