= Leonhard Fronsperger =

Leonhard Fronsperger (c. 1520–1575) was a Bavarian German soldier and author. He received the citizenship of Ulm in 1548 and served in the imperial army during 1553–1573, under Charles V, Ferdinand I and Maximilian II. He retired and received a pension from Maximilian in 1566. He became a military expert in the service of the city of Ulm, and died in an accident while on an inspection in 1575.

His major work is the Kriegsbuch, published in three parts in 1573, a sweeping overview over the military theory and technology of his time. He also wrote an early treatise on the economic theory of self-interest (Von dem Lob deß Eigen Nutzen, 1564), anticipating the gist of the Mandeville's paradox.
