= Grigory Kramarov =

Russian revolutionary

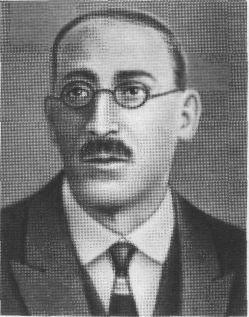

Grigory Moiseevich Kramarov (Russian: Григо́рий Моисеевич Кра́маров; 1887–1970), real name Gershel Moishevich Kramar (Russian: Гершель Мойшевич Кра́мар) was a Russian revolutionary and Bolshevik. He was an early promoter of the idea of space flight in the Soviet Union, actively advancing the concept from the 1920s.

== Biography ==
Involved in the 1905 revolution in St. Petersburg, Kramarov was arrested and eventually fled Russia, living for a time in San Francisco. He joined the Bolsheviks in 1907. Involved in the 1917 October Revolution, he was a member of the All-Russian Central Executive Committee (VTsIK) and took part in the civil war. Afterwards, he worked for the Comintern at the International Leninists School, as a journalist.

Kramarov was strongly involved in the promotion of rocketry and space travel in the Soviet Union, and was a founder and the chairman of the Society for Studies of Interplanetary Travel in 1924. In later years, he wrote two books on the early history of space exploration in Russia, "The World's First Society of Interplanetary Flight" and "The Dawn of Cosmonautics" (1965). Kramarov is a small lunar crater. Kramarov died in Moscow in 1970 and was buried at Novodevichy Cemetery.
