= V-2 sounding rocket =

Captured German V-2 rockets modified to carry scientific instruments

V-2 Sounding Rocket
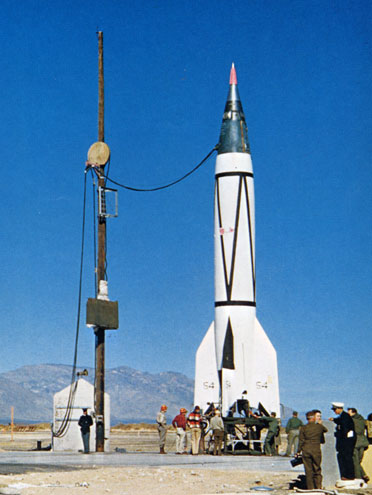
- A V-2 sounding rocket at White Sands Missile Range in 1946
- Type: Single-stage

Service history
- In service: 1946–1952
- Used by: United States

Specifications
- Mass: 13,000 kg (29,000 lb)
- Length: 14 m (45 ft 11 in)
- Diameter: 1.65 m (5 ft 5 in)
- Wingspan: 3.56 m (11 ft 8 in)
- Propellant: 3,810 kg (8,400 lb) 75% ethanol; 25% water; 4,910 kg (10,820 lb) liquid oxygen

Universal newsreel about a V-2 launch at White Sands Proving Ground on May 10, 1946

German V-2 rockets captured by the United States Army at the end of World War II were used as sounding rockets to carry scientific instruments into the Earth's upper atmosphere, and into sub-orbital space, at White Sands Missile Range (WSMR) for a program of atmospheric and solar investigation through the late 1940s. Rocket trajectory was intended to carry the rocket about 100 miles (160 km) high and 30 miles (48 km) horizontally from WSMR Launch Complex 33. Impact velocity of returning rockets was reduced by inducing structural failure of the rocket airframe upon atmospheric re-entry. More durable recordings and instruments might be recovered from the rockets after ground impact, but telemetry was developed to transmit and record instrument readings during flight.

== History ==
The first of 300 railroad cars of V-2 rocket components began to arrive at Las Cruces, New Mexico in July 1945 for transfer to WSMR. So much equipment was taken from Germany that the Deutsches Museum later had to obtain a V-2 for an exhibit from the US. In November General Electric (GE) employees began to identify, sort, and reassemble V-2 rocket components in WSMR Building 1538, designated as WSMR Assembly Building 1. The Army completed a blockhouse in WSMR Launch Area 1 in September 1945. WSMR Launch Complex 33 for the captured V-2s was built around this blockhouse.

Initial V-2 assembly efforts produced 25 rockets available for launch. The Army assembled an Upper Atmosphere Research Panel of representative from the Air Materiel Command, Naval Research Laboratory (NRL), Army Signal Corps, Ballistic Research Laboratory, Applied Physics Laboratory, University of Michigan, Harvard University, Princeton University, and General Electric Company. German rocket scientists of Operation Paperclip arrived at Fort Bliss in January 1946 to assist the V-2 rocket testing program. After a static test firing of a V-2 engine on 15 March 1946, the first V-2 rocket launch from Launch Complex 33 was on 16 April 1946. As the possibilities of the program were realized, GE personnel built new control components to replace deteriorated parts and used replacement parts with salvaged materials to make more than 75 V-2 sounding rockets available for atmospheric and solar investigation at WSMR. Approximately two V-2 launches per month were scheduled from Launch Complex 33 until the supply of V-2 sounding rockets was exhausted. A reduced frequency of V-2 sounding rocket investigations from Launch Complex 33 continued until 1952.

See also: Launches of captured V-2 rockets in the United States after 1945

== Modifications ==
The 2,200-pound (1,000 kg) explosive warhead in the 17-cubic-foot (0.48 m^{3}) nose cone was replaced by a package of instrumentation averaging 1,200 pounds (540 kg). Instrumentation was sometimes added to the control compartment, in the rear motor section, between the fuel tanks, or on the fins or skin of the rocket. Nose cone instrumentation was typically assembled at participating laboratories and flown to WSMR to be joined to the rocket in Assembly Building 1.

Rockets returning to Earth intact created an impact crater about 80 feet (24 m) wide and of similar depth which filled with debris to a depth of about 35 feet (11 m). In an effort to preserve instruments, dynamite was strategically placed within the airframe to be detonated at an elevation of 50 kilometres (31 mi) during downward flight at end of the high-altitude scientific observation interval. These explosives weakened the rocket structure so it would be torn apart by aerodynamic forces as it re-entered the denser lower atmosphere. Terminal velocity of tumbling fragments was reduced by an order of magnitude.

== Performance ==
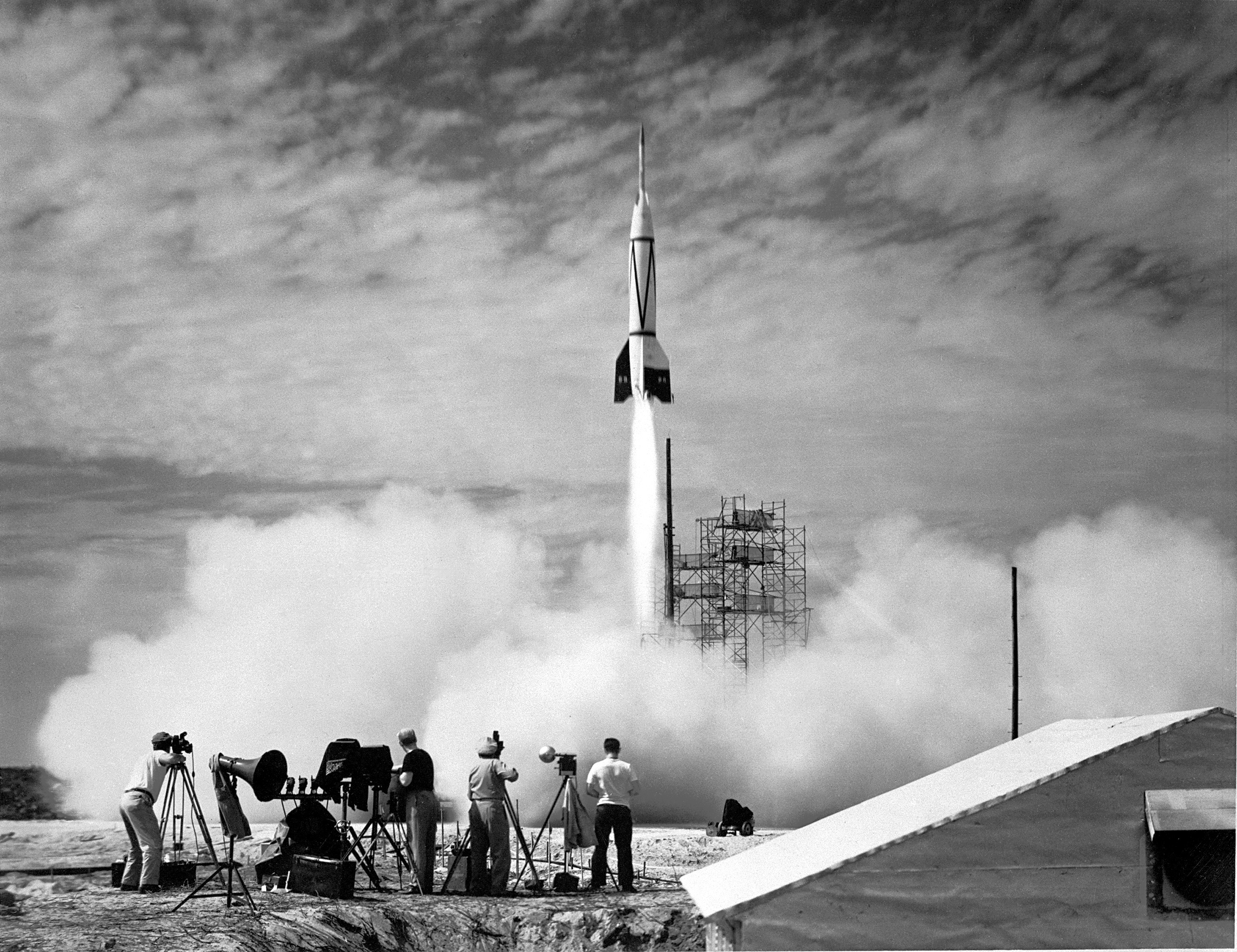
US test launch of a Bumper V-2.

V-2 sounding rockets were 47 feet (14 m) long and 5 feet 5 inches (1.65 m) in diameter and weighed 28,000 pounds (13,000 kg) with a full load of liquid fuel contributing two-thirds of that weight. The fuel was consumed in the first minute of flight producing a thrust of 56,000 pounds-force (250 kN). Maximum acceleration of 6 Gs was reached at minimum fuel weight just before burnout, and vibrational accelerations were of similar magnitude during powered flight. Velocity at burnout was approximately 5,000 feet (1,500 m) per second, or 3,400 miles per hour (5,500 km/h). The rocket would typically have a small, unpredictable angular momentum at burnout causing unpredictable roll with pitch or yaw as it coasted upward approximately 75 miles (121 km). A typical flight provided an observation window of 5 minutes at altitudes above 35 miles (56 km).

== Instrumentation ==
Servomechanisms were devised to compensate for rocket aspect changes as it tumbled after burnout. These allowed Sun-tracking devices to measure the solar electromagnetic spectrum. Limited success was achieved with parachute recovery of instrumentation, but some of the more durable instruments or recordings within the rocket airframe could withstand impact with the earth at subsonic velocities.

NRL developed a telemetry system using a 23-channel pulse-time modulation. Voltage presented to the input terminals of a given channel determined spacing between two adjacent pulses, not entirely unlike the technique of pulse-position modulation. Space between first and second pulses was determined by channel 1, between second and third pulses by channel 2, and so forth. The system made 200 samplings per second of 24 pulses. Information was transmitted via high-power frequency modulation. Ground receiving stations translated pulse spacings back into voltages which were applied to a bank of string galvanometers to make an approximately continuous record of each channel on a moving roll of film. Accuracy was within approximately 5 percent.

== Scientific operations ==
A 1946 Naval Research Laboratory launch took the first photographs of the Sun in the ultraviolet spectrum up to an altitude of 88 km (55 mi).

The first night flight of a V-2 sounding rocket began at 10:00 pm (MST) 17 December 1946 on an Applied Physics Laboratory flight. This rocket carried several explosive charges that generated artificial meteors, which could be observed photographically. The experiment package was installed by James Van Allen. Though the flight itself was photographed by observers as far away (285 mi (459 km)) as Tucson, Arizona, the charges and expected meteors were not, and it is likely they did not fire.

=== Blossom Project ===
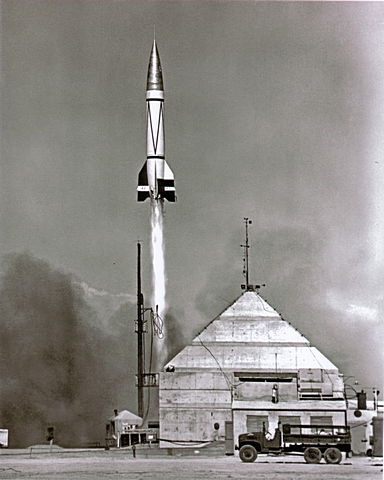
On June 14, 1949, V-2 launch No. 47 at Holloman Air Force Base in New Mexico carried Albert II to become the first primate and first mammal in space.

A series of flights designated as “Blossom Project” started with V-2 sounding rocket flight 20 (Blossom 1) on 20 February 1947 from White Sands Missile Range, New Mexico with the intent of performing animal tests. A series of seven flights were planned to test the possibilities of ejecting a canister with a parachute and recovering it intact. The parachute was to be ejected at the zenith of flight.

The purpose flight 20 experiment was to explore the effects of radiation exposure at high altitudes. The rocket reached 68 miles (109 km) in 3 minutes and 10 seconds, past both the U.S. Air Force 50-mile and the international 100 km definitions of the boundary of space. The Blossom capsule was ejected and successfully deployed its parachute. The fruit flies were recovered alive. Other V-2 missions carried biological samples, including seeds.

Albert II, a rhesus monkey, became the first primate and first mammal in space on 14 June 1949, in a U.S.-launched V-2 flight 47 (Blossom No. 4B), after the failure of the original Albert's mission on ascent (Blossom No. 3, flight 37 on 11 June 1948). Albert I reached only 30–39 miles (48–63 km) altitude; Albert II reached about 83 miles (134 km). Albert II died on impact after a parachute failure.

Numerous monkeys of several species were flown by the U.S. in the 1950s and 1960s. Monkeys were implanted with sensors to measure vital signs, and many were under anesthesia during launch. The death rate among monkeys at this stage was very high: about two-thirds of all monkeys launched in the 1940s and 1950s died on missions or soon after landing.

== See also ==
- Hermes (missile program)
- RTV-G-4 Bumper
- V-2 No. 13
- Spaceflight before 1951
