= List of V-2 test launches =

The list of V-2 test launches identifies World War II launches of the A4 rocket (renamed V-2 (Note: The rocket designation "V" is for Versuchsmuster (German: Test/Experimental Type).) in 1944). Test launches were made at Peenemünde Test Stand VII, Blizna V-2 missile launch site and Tuchola Forest using experimental and production rockets fabricated at Peenemünde and at the Mittelwerk. Post-war launches were performed in Germany at Cuxhaven, in the USSR at Kapustin Yar, in the USA at White Sands Proving Grounds, Cape Canaveral, and on the USS Midway during Operation Sandy.

== List of test launches at Peenemünde and the Greifswalder Oie ==
Launch Sites:

- P-VI = Test Stand VI (Prüfstand VI)
- P-VII = Test Stand VII (Prüfstand VII)
- P-X = Test Stand X (Prüfstand X)
- P-XII = Test Stand XII (Prüfstand XII)
- Oie = Greifswalder Oie, a small island used for vertical launches
- Karlshagen = area of destroyed settlement Karlshagen after air raid on 17 August 1943
- Rail = Launches from a train

Rocket number	Date	Burning time (s)	Range (km)	Pad	Remarks
1942
V-1	18 March, 1942	-	0	Tower	The first A-4 flight-test model was completed 25 February 1942, but slipped out of its "corset" after being fully tanked at Test Stand VII, fell 2 meters, smashed three fins, and came to rest on the rim of the engine nozzle. After being repaired and renamed Versuchsmuster 1 (V1: Experimental Type 1), the rocket failed during a test firing (witnessed by Albert Speer) and was scrapped without any further launch attempt.
V-2	13 June 1942	36	1.3	P-VII	After being photographed by a British Supermarine Spitfire on 15 May, the second flight test model was damaged during its fourth firing test on 20 May, and then at the launch (observed by Speer, Erhard Milch, Fromm, Leeb, Witzell); a roll-rate gyro malfunctioned immediately after launch. After the rolling missile became supersonic, the propellant feed system failed, telemetry ended at 54 sec (15000 ft), and the missile fell cart-wheeling into the Baltic less than a kilometer away and exploded.
V-3	16 August 1942	45	8.7	P-VII	Nose broke off
V-4	3 October 1942	58	190	P-VII	Too steep due to pitch program error, otherwise success. Altitude 85 – 90 km - approximately the Kármán line altitude (85 ~ 100km), where aerodynamic lift vanishes. It was described at the time as the first rocket to reach the edge of space, though not according to the modern FAI definition of 100km altitude. However, both the physical Kármán line and jurisdictional FAI definitions were made much later.
V-5	21 October 1942	84	147	P-VII	Steam generator misbehaved
V-6	9 November 1942	54	14	P-VII	Vertical, height 67 km
V-7	28 November 1942	37	8.6	P-VII	Tumbled, lost vanes
V-9	9 December 1942	4	0.1	P-VII	Hydrogen peroxide explosion
1943
V-10	7 January 1943	-	0	P-VII	Explosion on ignition
V-11	25 January 1943	64.5	105	P-VII	Too steep, rolled
V-12	17 February 1943	61	196	P-VII	Too shallow
V-13	19 February 1943	18	4.8	P-VII	Fire in tail
V-16	3 March 1943	33	1.0	P-VII	Vertical, explosion
V-18	18 March 1943	60	133	P-VII	Too steep, rotated
V-19	25 March 1943	28	1.2	P-VII	Tumbled, exploded
V-17	3 April 1943	64.5	?	P-VII	
V-20	14 April 1943	66	287	P-VII	Fell on land
V-21	22 April 1943	59	252	P-VII	Fell on land
V-22	14 May 1943	62	250	P-VII	Cut-off switch failed
V-26	26 May 1943	66.5	265	P-VII	The Kommission für Fernschießen (English: Commission for Long-Range Firing/Weapons/Bombardment), including Albert Speer, Karl Dönitz, and Erhard Milch—viewed two successful Peenemünde A-4 launches (V26 around noon, V25 late afternoon), followed by two launches of the V-1 flying bomb (both V-1s plunged into the sea.)
V-25	26 May 1943	40	27	P-VII	Brennschluss (engine cut-off) at 40 s
V-24	27 May 1943	55	138	P-VII	-
V-23	1 June 1943	62	235	P-VII	Premature engine cutoff
V-29	11 June 1943	63.5	238	P-VII	-
V-31	16 June 1943	60.5	221	P-VII	Premature engine cutoff
V-28	22 June 1943	62.5	75	P-VII	exploded after 75 s
V-30	24 June 1943	65.1	287	P-X	Cut-off switch failed, first launch on Prüfstand X
V-36	26 June 1943	64.9	235	P-VII	-
V-38	29 June 1943	15	3	P-VII	Fell on airport
V-40	29 June 1943	63.6	236	P-VII	Impact not observed
V-33	1 July 1943	-	0	P-VII	Engine cutoff at take-off, exploded
V-41	9 July 1943	4	0.1	P-VII	Fell on pump building
V-34	9 July 1943	-	0	P-VII	Engine cutoff at take-off, exploded
V-54	12 August 1943	64	?	P-VII	Successful launch
V-49	6 October 1943	68	?	P-VII	Successful launch, duration 272 s; first launch after raid on 17 August 1943
V-71	15 October 1943	?	?		
V-67	21 October 1943	?	?		
V-69	25 October 1943	63	?	P-VII	Successful launch, duration 286 s
V-43	9 November 1943	?	?		
V-73	4 December 1943	63	?	P-VII	Successful launch, duration 286 s
V-60	10 December 1943	69	?	P-VII	Successful launch, duration 247 s
V-59	21 December 1943	33	?	P-VII	Only partial success, premature engine cutoff, duration of flight 104 s
V-91	30 December 1943	?	?		
January 1944
V-32	7 January 1944	43	?	P-VII	Exploded 43 s after launch
V-82	11 January 1944	?	?		
V-77	20 January 1944	?	?		
V-75	25 January 1944	?	?		
MW 17003	27 January 1944	?	?	P-VII	First test of a rocket built at Mittelwerk (Note: The rocket designation "MW" was used for rockets produced at the underground Mittelwerk facility) detonated three seconds after ignition without liftoff. "We just blew a million marks in order to guess what could have been reported accurately by an instrument probably worth the price of a small motorcycle." (Hartmut Kütchen, Engineer in Charge of Test Stand VII)
February 1944
V-106	4 February 1944	?	?		
MW 17009	9 February 1944	?	?		
MW 17007	10 February 1944	?	?		
MW 17010	11 February 1944	?	?		
MW 17001	13 February 1944	?	?		
V-98	15 February 1944	?	?		
MW 17004	16 February 1944	?	?	P-VII	
V-85	17 February 1944	?	?		
MW 17021	18 February 1944	?	?		
MW 17006	21 February 1944	?	?		
MW 17011	23 February 1944	?	?		
MW 17015	23 February 1944	?	?	P-VII	
V-112	28 February 1944	?	?		
March 1944
V-84	2 March 1944	?	?	P-VII	Exploded
MW 17016	4 March 1944	?	?		
V-151	7 March 1944	?	?		
V-126	7 March 1944	?	?		
MW 17020	9 March 1944	?	?	P-VII	
V-116	10 March 1944	?	?		
V-128	10 March 1944	?	?		
V-88	11 March 1944	59	?	P-VII	Flight duration 282 s
MW 17022	15 March 1944	?	?		
MW 17018	16 March 1944	?	?		
MW 17033	18 March 1944	?	?		
V-145	21 March 1944	?	?		
V-121	23 March 1944	?	?		
MW 17031	24 March 1944	?	?		
MW 17019	27 March 1944	?	?		
V-132	29 March 1944	?	?		
April 1944
MW 17098	3 April 1944	?	?	P-VII	
V-86	5 April 1944	?	?	P-VII	exploded after 17s
MW 17043	7 April 1944	?	?	P-VII	
MW 17063	14 April 1944	?	?	P-VII	
MW 17108	20 April 1944	?	?	P-X	
May 1944
MW 17200	10 May 1944	?	?	P-X	
V-152	12 May 1944	?	?		
MW 17320	14 May 1944	?	?		
V-136	16 May 1944	65	?	P-VII	
MW 17323	17 May 1944	?	?		
V-144	22 May 1944	?	?	P-VII	
MW 17312	23 May 1944	?	?		
V-89 MW 17309	24 May 1944	?	?	P-X	Launch Sequence #89: Beginning with launching 89, temperature measurements at the tip of the rocket were used for diagnosing the airburst problem.
V-170	27 May 1944	?	?	P-VII	
V-146	31 May 1944	58	?	P-VII	
June 1944
MW 17558	1 June 1944	?	?	P-VII	
V-140	2 June 1944	60	?	P-VII	
MW 17656	3 June 1944	?	?	P-VII	
MW 17746	6 June 1944	?	?	P-VII	
MW 17557	7 June 1944	?	?	P-X	
V-171	8 June 1944	69	?	P-VII	
MW 17747	8 June 1944	?	?	P-X	
V-159	9 June 1944	11	?	P-VII	
V-158	10 June 1944	68	?	P-VII	
V-209	11 June 1944	61	?	P-VII	
MW 17725	11 June 1944	?	?	Oie	
V-89	13 June 1944	?	350		The "Bäckebo Bomb" (Crashed in Sweden at 56.910408 N 15.980360 E)
V-172	14 June 1944	?	?	P-VII	
MW 17727	14 June 1944	?	?	Oie	
MW 17840	15 June 1944	?	?	P-VII	
MW 17839	17 June 1944	?	?	P-VII	
MW 18012	18 June 1944	?	?	Oie	
V-177	20 June 1944	?	?		
MW 18014	20 June 1944	?	?	Oie	Apogee 176 km, first man-made object to reach space by the modern definition (100 km altitude).
MW 17940	20 June 1944	?	?	P-X	
MW 18017	21 June 1944	?	?	Oie	
MW 17939	21 June 1944	?	?	P-VII	
V-157	22 June 1944	?	?		
MW 18007	23 June 1944	?	?	P-VII	
MW 17657	24 June 1944	?	?	P-VII	
MW 18016	24 June 1944	?	?	Oie	
MW 18013	24 June 1944	?	?	Oie	
MW 18008	26 June 1944	?	?	P-VII	
MW 18015	26 June 1944	?	?	Oie	
V-208	27 June 1944	59	?	P-VII	
V-167	28 June 1944	?	?		
V-173	29 June 1944	?	?		
V-211	30 June 1944	?	?	P-X	
July 1944
MW 18011	1 July 1944	?	?	P-X	
MW 18010	3 July 1944	?	?	P-X	
V-212	4 July 1944	?	?	P-X	
MW 18143	5 July 1944	?	?	Oie	
MW 18144	6 July 1944	?	?	Oie	
V-214	7 July 1944	?	?	P-X	
MW 18020	8 July 1944	?	?	Oie	
V-210	10 July 1944	60	?	P-VII	
V-160	14 July 1944	?	?	P-X	
MW 18019	21 July 1944	?	?	Oie	
V-178	29 July 1944	?	?	Oie	
V-205	31 July 1944	67	237	P-X	
August 1944
MW 18207	1 August 1944	?	?	Oie	
MW 18203	1 August 1944	?	?	Oie	
MW 18204	2 August 1944	?	?	Oie	
V-202	3 August 1944	?	?	P-X	
V-179	4 August 1944	?	?	Oie	
MW 18200	12 August 1944	?	?	Oie	
V-181	13 August 1944	50	0,5	P-XII	exploded
V-182	13 August 1944	10	0.07	P-XII	exploded
MW 18267	15 August 1944	?	?	Oie	
MW 18266	15 August 1944	?	?	Oie	
MW 18263	16 August 1944	61	227	P-VII	
V-227	17 August 1944	?	?		
MW 18239	17 August 1944	66	284	P-X	
MW 18238	20 August 1944	66	239	P-X	
MW 18243	20 August 1944	64	235	P-VII	
V-216	22 August 1944	57	196	P-VII	
MW 18233	22 August 1944	67	224	P-X	
V-226	23 August 1944	?	?		
MW 18222	24 August 1944	64	189	P-X	
MW 18240	26 August 1944	61	226	P-X	
MW 18299	30 August 1944	?	?	P-VI	
September 1944
V-225	1 September 1944	?	?	P-X	
MW 18293	2 September 1944	?	?	P-VI	
V-206	4 September 1944	?	?	P-X	
V-230	5 September 1944	?	?	P-X	
V-222	8 September 1944	?	?	P-X	
V-231	13 September 1944	?	?	Oie	
V-223	14 September 1944	?	?	P-X	
MW 18257	15 September 1944	?	?	Oie	
MW 18330	17 September 1944	?	?	Oie	
V-234	19 September 1944	?	?	P-X	
V-240	19 September 1944	?	?	Oie	
V-217	20 September 1944	?	?	P-X	
V-239	20 September 1944	?	?	Oie	
V-218	21 September 1944	?	?	P-X	
V-232	21 September 1944	?	?	Oie	
V-219	22 September 1944	?	?	P-X	
MW 18179	22 September 1944	?	?	Oie	
V-241	26 September 1944	?	?	P-X	
V-238	28 September 1944	?	?	P-X	
V-242	30 September 1944	?	?	P-VII	
October 1944
MW 18786	1 October 1944	?	?	Karlshagen	
V-235	3 October 1944	?	?	P-VII	
MW 18889	3 October 1944	?	?	Karlshagen	
V-245	4 October 1944	?	?	P-X	
V-236	7 October 1944	?	?	P-VII	
MW 18787	7 October 1944	?	?	Karlshagen	
V-248	9 October 1944	?	?	P-VII	
V-249	11 October 1944	?	?	P-VII	
MW 18781	12 October 1944	?	?	Karlshagen	
V-237	12 October 1944	?	?	P-VII	
MW 18782	13 October 1944	?	?	Karlshagen	
V-250	14 October 1944	?	?	P-VII	
MW 18338	14 October 1944	?	?	Karlshagen	
V-251	17 October 1944	?	?	P-VII	
V-252	18 October 1944	?	?	P-VII	
V-246	19 October 1944	?	?	P-VII	
V-256	23 October 1944	?	?	P-VII	
V-247	24 October 1944	?	?	P-X	
V-258	24 October 1944	?	?	P-VII	
V-257	25 October 1944	?	?	P-VII	
V-259	30 October 1944	?	?	P-VII	Hermann Göring attended the launch: "That's terrific! We must have that at the first Party Rally after the war!"
V-260	30 October 1944	?	?	P-VI	Hermann Göring at the launch: "Why is it that this fellow [ Walter Dornberger ] manages all right and you [ developer Dr. Kramer of Ruhr Steel ] don't? Let him show you how it ought to be done."
November 1944
V-253	1 November 1944	?	?	P-VII	
V-220	3 November 1944	?	?	P-VII	
V-262	6 November 1944	?	?	P-VII	
MW 19304	7 November 1944	?	?	P-X	
V-263	8 November 1944	?	?	P-VII	
V-261	9 November 1944	?	?	P-VII	
V-264	9 November 1944	?	?	P-X	
V-266	13 November 1944	?	?	P-VII	
V-265	15 November 1944	?	?	P-VII	
V-267	17 November 1944	?	?	P-VII	
V-221	20 November 1944	?	?		
V-268	22 November 1944	?	?	P-VII	
MW 19862	23 November 1944	?	?	Karlshagen	
MW 19866	23 November 1944	?	?	Karlshagen	
V-271	24 November 1944	?	?		
MW 19864	25 November 1944	?	?	Rail	
MW 19861	26 November 1944	?	?	Rail	
V-272	27 November 1944	?	?		
V-276	28 November 1944	?	?	P-X	
MW 19868	28 November 1944	?	?	Karlshagen	
MW 19873	29 November 1944	?	?	Rail	
MW 19305	30 November 1944	?	?		
December 1944
V-423	1 December 1944	?	?		
V-269	1 December 1944	?	?		
MW 19302	1 December 1944	?	?	Rail	
V-243	2 December 1944	?	?	P-VII	
MW 19020	2 December 1944	?	?		
V-277	4 December 1944	?	?		
MW 19301	4 December 1944	?	?	Rail	
V-254	6 December 1944	?	?		
MW 19874	7 December 1944	?	?	Karlshagen	
V-278	8 December 1944	?	?		
MW 19020	9 December 1944	?	?	P-VI	
V-282	12 December 1944	?	?	P-VII	
MW 18783	12 December 1944	?	?	Karlshagen	
V-283	14 December 1944	?	?	P-VII	
V-288	16 December 1944	?	?	P-VII	
V-289	19 December 1944	?	?	P-VII	
V-291	22 December 1944	?	?	P-VII	
V-290	28 December 1944	?	?	P-VII	
V-286	30 December 1944	?	?		
January 1945
V-287	3 January 1945	?	?		
MW 20835	4 January 1945	?	262	Karlshagen	
MW 20826	6 January 1945	?	323	Karlshagen	
V-294	8 January 1945	?	?	P-VII	
V-292	9 January 1945	?	?	P-VII	
MW 20821	11 January 1945	?	285	Karlshagen	
MW 20840	13 January 1945	?	314	Karlshagen	
MW 20831	15 January 1945	?	325	Karlshagen	
MW 20348	15 January 1945	?	?	P-X	
V-275	16 January 1945	?	?	P-X	
V-293	16 January 1945	?	?		
MW 20850	16 January 1945	?	?	Karlshagen	
MW 20348	16 January 1945	?	?		
MW 20832	17 January 1945	?	?	Karlshagen	
V-301	19 January 1945	?	?	P-X	
V-295	22 January 1945	?	?	P-VII	
V-302	22 January 1945	?	?	P-X	
MW 20465	25 January 1945	?	?	P-VII	
MW 20829	25 January 1945	?	?	Karlshagen	
MW 20827	27 January 1945	?	?	Karlshagen	
MW 20338	30 January 1945	?	?	P-VII	
V-303	31 January 1945	?	?	P-VII	
February 1945
V-284	3 February 1945	?	?	P-X	
V-274	4 February 1945	?	?	P-VII	
V-285	5 February 1945	?	?	P-X	
V-309	6 February 1945	?	?	P-VII	
MW 21402	6 February 1945	47	?	Karlshagen	
V-296	7 February 1945	?	?	P-VII	
MW 21401	7 February 1945	?	?	Karlshagen	
V-310	8 February 1945	?	?	P-X	
V-297	9 February 1945	?	?	P-VII	
V-298	9 February 1945	?	?	P-X	
V-270	10 February 1945	?	?	P-X	
V-313	10 February 1945	?	?	P-VII	
MW 21404	10 February 1945	?	380	Karlshagen	
V-273	12 February 1945	?	?	P-VII	
MW 21405	12 February 1945	?	?	Karlshagen	
V-299	13 February 1945	?	?	P-X	
V-314	13 February 1945	?	?	P-VII	
MW 21406	13 February 1945	?	358	Karlshagen	
MW 21403	13 February 1945	?	?	Karlshagen	
V-255	14 February 1945	?	?	P-VII	
MW 21407	16 February 1945	?	380	Karlshagen	
MW 21399	18 February 1945	36	?	Karlshagen	
MW 21408	19 February 1945	?	430	Karlshagen	
MW 21400	20 February 1945	?	350	Karlshagen	

=== Launches of A4b ===
Rocket number	Date	Launch site	Range	Remarks
G-1	27 December 1944	Pad 10	0	Guidance failure 50 metres above ground
G-2	13 January 1945			Failure. Launch attempt controversial
G-3	24 January 1945	Oie		Successful launch, but wing broke at flight

== Blizna test launch list ==
Launch number	Rocket number	Date	Range (km)	Remarks
1943
1		5 November 1943		
2		5 December 1943		
3	V-96	22 December 1943		
January 1944
4		5 January 1944		
5		6 January 1944		success
6		7 January 1944		tail explosion
7		7 January 1944		success
8		8 January 1944		failure
9		17 January 1944		
10	V-107	18 January 1944		failure
11	V-105	29 January 1944		failure
February 1944
12		16 February 1944		
13		17 February 1944		
14		19 February 1944		
15	MW 17 071	23 February 1944		early cut-off
16	MW 17 036	24 February 1944		success
17		26 February 1944		
March 1944
18		2 March 1944		
19		4 March 1944		
20		5 March 1944		
21		6 March 1944		
22	MW 17047	17 March 1944		
23		18 March 1944		
24		20 March 1944		
25		21 March 1944		
26		25 March 1944		
27		31 March 1944		
April 1944
28		1 April 1944		
29		2 April 1944		
30		4 April 1944		
31		6 April 1944		
32		16 April 1944		
33	MW 17354	20 April 1944		Attempt cancelled and made on 22 April 1944 as launch number 38
34	MW 17355	20 April 1944	257	Airburst
35	MW 17342	21 April 1944	85	Failure
36	MW 17356	21 April 1944	157	Airburst
37	MW 17360	21 April 1944	216	Airburst
38	MW 17354	22 April 1944	261	Airburst
39	MW 17382	22 April 1944	257	Airburst
40	MW 17344	23 April 1944		Failed at launch
41	MW 17341	28 April 1944	256	Airburst
42	MW 17349	28 April 1944	255	Airburst
43	MW 17351	29 April 1944	254	Airburst
44	MW 17378	29 April 1944	257	Impact
45	MW 17350	30 April 1944	255	Impact
46	MW 17361	30 April 1944	150	Airburst
May 1944
47	MW 17359	1 May 1944	338	Airburst
48	MW 17381	1 May 1944	253	Airburst
49	MW 17388	1 May 1944	29	Failure
50	MW 17352	3 May 1944	5.2	Failure
51	MW 17353	3 May 1944	0.1	Failed after lift-off
52	MW 17357	3 May 1944	nil	Failure
53	MW 17365	3 May 1944		Failure
54	MW 17369	3 May 1944	257	Airburst
55	MW 17358	4 May 1944	250	Airburst
56	MW 17367	4 May 1944		Failure
57	MW 17368	4 May 1944		Failure
58	MW 17362	5 May 1944		Failure; also failed on attempt on 9 May 1944
59	MW 17366	5 May 1944	259	Airburst
60	MW 17385	5 May 1944	258	Airburst
61	MW 17364	6 May 1944	258	Airburst
62	MW 17386	6 May 1944	258	Airburst
63	MW 17392	6 May 1944	1.7	Failure
64	MW 17383	7 May 1944	293	Airburst
65	MW 17387	7 May 1944	294.0	Guidance failure
66	MW 17348	8 May 1944	nil	Failed at launch
67	MW 17333	9 May 1944		Failed
68	MW 17389	9 May 1944		Failure
69	MW 17332	10 May 1944	259	Impact
70	MW 17384	10 May 1944	4.8	Failure
71	MW 17327	11 May 1944	262	Impact
72	MW 17331	11 May 1944	260	Impact
73	MW 17398	12 May 1944	300	Airburst
74	MW 17 399	12 May 1944		success
75	MW 17330	13 May 1944	258	Airburst
76	MW 17390	14 May 1944	161	Impact
77	MW 17334	15 May 1944	261	Airburst
78	MW 17393	15 May 1944	258	Airburst
79	MW 17401	17 May 1944	259	Airburst
80	MW 17683	18 May 1944	4.3	Failure
81	MW 17687	18 May 1944	32.0	Guidance failure
82	MW 17686	20 May 1944		Failure
83	MW 17748	21 May 1944	254	Impact
84	MW 17749	21 May 1944		Failure
85	MW 17753	21 May 1944		Failure
86	MW 17757	21 May 1944	259	Airburst
87	MW 17760	21 May 1944		Failure
88	MW 17764	21 May 1944	330	Airburst
89	MW 17750	22 May 1944	255	Airburst
90	MW 17762	22 May 1944	130	Airburst
91	MW 17766	22 May 1944		Failure
92	MW 17767	22 May 1944	109	Airburst
93	MW 17751	23 May 1944	2	Failure
94	MW 17752	23 May 1944	253	Airburst
95	MW 17754	23 May 1944	258	Airburst
96	MW 17755	23 May 1944		Failed
97	MW 17758	23 May 1944	255	Airburst; Re-launch from 21 May 1944
98	MW 17759	23 May 1944	251	Airburst
99	MW 17761	23 May 1944	263	Airburst
100	MW 17765	23 May 1944	256	Airburst
101	MW 17768	23 May 1944	337	Airburst
102	MW 17403	24 May 1944	264	Airburst
103	MW 17769	24 May 1944	252	Impact; (Failed attempt on 22 May)
104	MW 17682	26 May 1944	259	Airburst
105	MW 17397	27 May 1944	178	Airburst
106	MW 17400	27 May 1944	262	Airburst
107	MW 17405	27 May 1944		Failure
108	MW 17688	27 May 1944	86	Airburst
109	MW 17773	27 May 1944	162	Airburst
110	MW 17774	28 May 1944	244	Airburst
111	MW 17329	29 May 1944	129	Airburst
112	MW 17402	29 May 1944		Failure
113	MW 17670	29 May 1944	257	Impact
114	MW 17770	29 May 1944	207	Airburst
115	MW 17775	29 May 1944	251	Airburst
116	MW 17782	29 May 1944	240	Impact
117	MW 17783	29 May 1944	240	Airburst
118	MW 17771	30 May 1944	254	Impact
119	MW 17784	30 May 1944	226	Airburst
June 1944
120	MW 17776	1 June 1944	202	Impact
121	MW 17779	1 June 1944	153	Impact
122	MW 17780	1 June 1944	178.0	Guidance failure
123	MW 17781	1 June 1944	45.5	Guidance failure
124	MW 17777	5 June 1944	58	Failure
125	MW 17772	6 June 1944	199	Airburst
126	MW 17802	6 June 1944	213	Impact
127	MW 17 809	14 June 1944		success
128	MW 17 796	14 June 1944		failure
129	MW 17 995	15 June 1944		success
130	MW 18022	16 June 1944	270	Airburst
131	MW 18024	16 June 1944	270	Airburst
132	MW 18025	16 June 1944	333	Airburst
133	MW 18027	16 June 1944	203	Airburst
134	MW 18028	16 June 1944	267	Airburst
135	MW 18026	17 June 1944	270	Airburst
136	MW 18029	17 June 1944	231	Airburst
137	MW 18030	17 June 1944	115	Airburst
138	MW 18031	17 June 1944	270	Airburst
139	MW 18032	17 June 1944	268	Airburst
140	MW 18035	17 June 1944	133	Impact
141	MW 18037	17 June 1944	13	Failure
142	MW 18038	17 June 1944	132	Airburst
143	MW 18042	17 June 1944	262	Airburst
144	MW 18033	18 June 1944	258	Impact
145	MW 18039	18 June 1944	296	Airburst
146	MW 18047	18 June 1944	276	Impact
147	MW 18048	18 June 1944	269	Airburst
148	MW 18050	18 June 1944	269	Airburst
149	MW 18051	18 June 1944		Failed
150	MW 18056	18 June 1944	270	Airburst
151	MW 18058	18 June 1944	334	Airburst
152	MW 18059	18 June 1944		Failed
153	MW 18060	18 June 1944	224	Airburst
154	MW 18061	18 June 1944	262	Airburst
155	MW 18 041	18 June 1944		
156	MW 18040	19 June 1944	136	Airburst
157	MW 18043	19 June 1944		Failed
158	MW 18044	19 June 1944	303	Airburst
159	MW 18046	20 June 1944	5	Failed
160	MW 18049	20 June 1944		Failed
161	MW 18062	20 June 1944		Failed on lift-off
162	MW 18064	20 June 1944	226	Airburst
163	MW 18065	20 June 1944	206	Airburst
164	MW 18066	20 June 1944	204	Airburst
165	MW 18067	20 June 1944	308	Airburst
166	MW 18068	20 June 1944	253	Airburst
167	MW 18069	20 June 1944	272	Airburst
168	MW 18070	20 June 1944	283	Airburst
169	MW 18073	20 June 1944	270	Airburst
170	MW 18079	20 June 1944	214	Airburst
171	MW 18080	20 June 1944	287	Airburst
172	MW 18052	21 June 1944	300	Airburst
173	MW 18057	21 June 1944		Failed
174	MW 18093	21 June 1944		Failed
175	MW 18053	22 June 1944	209	Airburst
176	MW 18054	22 June 1944	219	Airburst
177	MW 18091	22 June 1944		Failed
178	MW 18092	22 June 1944	278	Airburst
179	MW 18094	22 June 1944	242	Airburst
180	MW 18103	22 June 1944	217	Airburst
181	MW 18072	24 June 1944		Failed
182	MW 18087	24 June 1944	155	Impact
183	MW 18097	24 June 1944	211	Impact
184	MW 18098	24 June 1944	119	Impact
185	MW 18085	25 June 1944	243	Airburst
186	MW 18086	25 June 1944	249	Airburst
187	MW 18096	26 June 1944	289	Airburst
188	MW 18099	26 June 1944	285	Airburst
189	MW 18113	26 June 1944	261	Impact
190	MW 18114	26 June 1944	266	Impact
191	MW 18116	26 June 1944	282	Impact
192	MW 18115	27 June 1944		Failed
193		27 June 1944	269	Airburst
194	MW 18123	27 June 1944		Exploded on pad
195	MW 18124	27 June 1944		Impact
196	MW 18125	27 June 1944	161	Airburst
197	MW 18126	27 June 1944	251	Impact
198	MW 18112	28 June 1944	295	Impact
199	MW 18117	28 June 1944	266	Impact
200	MW 18118	28 June 1944	32.5	Failed
201	MW 18121	28 June 1944	274	Airburst
202	MW 18122	28 June 1944	221	Airburst
203	MW 18 089	30 June 1944		success
204	MW 18 108	30 June 1944		success

== Tuchola forest test launch list ==
Launch number	Ongoing number	Rocket destination	Date	Range (km)	Remarks
September 1944
1	127	MW 18757	10 September 1944		Abandoned
2	128	MW 18769	12 September 1944	221	
3	129	MW 18767	13 September 1944		Failed on pad
4	130	MW 18761	13 September 1944	178	
5	131	MW 18765	13 September 1944	220	
6	132	MW 18745	14 September 1944	218	
7	133	MW 18758	14 September 1944	210	
8	134	MW 18751	14 September 1944		Failed on pad. Returned to HAP
9	135	MW 18756	15 September 1944	4	Guidance failed after lift-off
10	136	MW 18763	15 September 1944	12	Propulsion system explosion
11	137	MW 18746	16 September 1944	217	
12	138	MW 18750	16 September 1944	193	Airburst
13	139	MW 18752	17 September 1944	168	Airburst
14	140	MW 18754	17 September 1944	164	Airburst
15	141	MW 18755	18 September 1944	165	Impact
16	142	MW 18747	18 September 1944	171	Impact
17	143	MW 18766	18 September 1944	166	Airburst
18	144	MW 18762	18 September 1944	141	Impact
19	145	MW 18753	19 September 1944	199	Airburst
20	146	MW 18764	19 September 1944	162	Airburst
21	147	MW 18822	21 September 1944	160	Impact
22	148	MW 18824	21 September 1944	173	Impact
23	149	MW 18825	22 September 1944	143	Impact
24	150	MW 18826	22 September 1944	177	Impact
25	151	MW 18823	23 September 1944	42	Early impact
26	152	MW 18821	23 September 1944	151	Impact
27	153	MW 18831	23 September 1944	242	Impact
28	154	MW 18827	24 September 1944	141	Impact
29	155	MW 18820	24 September 1944		Abort. Returned to HAP.
30	157	MW 18806	25 September 1944	168	Airburst
31	158	MW 18807	25 September 1944	143	Airburst
32	159	MW 18808	25 September 1944	164	Airburst
33	160	MW 18815	25 September 1944	164	Impact
34	161	MW 18803	25 September 1944	162	Airburst
35	162	MW 18801	26 September 1944	171	Airburst
36	163	MW 18804	26 September 1944	165	Impact
37	164	MW 18805	26 September 1944	166	Airburst
38	165	MW 18802	26 September 1944	162	Airburst
39	166	MW 18803	26 September 1944		Abandoned; damaged fin. Launch tried on 5 October 1944
40	167	MW 18770	26 September 1944	92	Airburst
41	156	MW 18837	27 September 1944	138	Airburst
42	168	MW 18771	27 September 1944	160	Airburst
43	169	MW 18774	30 September 1944	170	Airburst
44	170	MW 18788	30 September 1944	167	Impact
45	171	MW 18794	30 September 1944	179	Impact
October 1944
46	172	MW 18777	1 October 1944	166	
47	173	MW 18772	1 October 1944	170	
48	174	MW 18773	1 October 1944	173	
49	175	MW 18778	2 October 1944	132	
50	176	MW 18776	2 October 1944	170	
51	177	MW 18796	2 October 1944	247	Airburst
52	178	MW 18795	2 October 1944	236	Airburst
53	179	MW 18799	5 October 1944	229	Airburst
54	180	MW 18798	5 October 1944	230	Airburst
55	181	MW 18792	5 October 1944	225	Impact
56	182	MW 18797	5 October 1944	252	Airburst
57	183	MW 18803	5 October 1944	228	Impact
58	184	MW 18791	5 October 1944	233	Impact
59	185	MW 18790	5 October 1944	183	Airburst
60	187	MW 19041	6 October 1944	222	
61	188	MW 19048	6 October 1944	225	
62	189	MW 19045	9 October 1944	213	
63	190	MW 19047	9 October 1944	210	
64	191	MW 19039	9 October 1944	205	Impact
65	192	MW 19043	9 October 1944	7	Failed after launch
66	193	MW 19042	9 October 1944	219	
67	194	MW 19046	10 October 1944	220	
68	195	MW 19040	10 October 1944	224	Airburst
69	196	MW 19044	10 October 1944	209	
70	197	MW 18810	10 October 1944	239	Airburst
71	198	MW 18813	10 October 1944	209	Impact
72	199	MW 18809	10 October 1944	200	
73	200	MW 18811	11 October 1944	272	Impact
74	201	MW 18816	11 October 1944	217	Airburst
75	202	MW 18814	11 October 1944	216	Impact
76	203	MW 18818	11 October 1944	220	Airburst
77	204	MW 18812	14 October 1944	245	Impact
78	205	MW 18819	14 October 1944	44	Damaged at launch
79	206	MW 18817	14 October 1944	245	Impact
80	207	MW 19487	28 October 1944	223	
81	208	MW 19486	29 October 1944	224	
82	209	MW 19484	30 October 1944	217	
83	210	MW 19498	30 October 1944	223	
84	211	MW 19488	31 October 1944	223	
85	212	MW 19491	31 October 1944	223	
86	213	MW 19489	31 October 1944	231	
November 1944
87	214	MW 19504	1 November 1944	2	
88	215	MW 19490	1 November 1944	221	
89	216	Ma241	1 November 1944		Failed on pad
90	217	MW 19492	2 November 1944	223	Impact
91	218	MW 19493	2 November 1944	218	Impact
92	219	MW 19494	3 November 1944	214	Impact
93	220	MW 19496	3 November 1944	221	Impact
94	221	MW 19495	4 November 1944	226	Impact
95	222	MW 19497	4 November 1944	224	Airburst
96	223	MW 19502	5 November 1944	224	Airburst
97	224	MW 19500	5 November 1944	116	Airburst
98	225	MW 19501	5 November 1944	222	Airburst
99	226	MW 19499	5 November 1944	112	Airburst
100	227	MW 19508	6 November 1944	250	Impact
101	228	MW 19511	7 November 1944	290	Impact
102	229	MW 19514	7 November 1944	250	Airburst
103	230	MW 19506	7 November 1944	293	Airburst
104	231	MW 19507	7 November 1944	250	Impact
105	232	MW 19509	8 November 1944	1	Failed after launch
106	236	MW 19520	9 November 1944	257	Impact
107		MW 19519	9 November 1944		Returned to Mittelwerk
108	238	MW 19516	10 November 1944	248	Airburst
109	239	MW 19518	10 November 1944	35	Impact
110		MW 19529	11 November 1944		Returned to MW
111	235	MW 19510	12 November 1944	49	Exploded after launch
112	237	MW 19528	12 November 1944	245	Impact
113	233	MW 19513	13 November 1944	267	Airburst
114	234	MW 19512	13 November 1944	90	Impact
115	241	19525	14 November 1944	250	Impact
116	242	MW 19517	14 November 1944	250	Impact
117	243	MW 19549	15 November 1944	197	
118	244	MW 19548	15 November 1944	196	
119	245	MW 19544	18 November 1944	76	
120	246	MW 19547	19 November 1944	159	
121	247	MW 19545	19 November 1944	168	
122	248	MW 19553	20 November 1944	183	
123	249	MW 19550	20 November 1944	194	
124	250	MW 19552	20 November 1944	189	
125	251	MW 19551	21 November 1944	113	
126	252	MW 19546	21 November 1944	168	
127	253	MW 19829	21 November 1944	233	Impact
128	254	MW 19843	22 November 1944	229	Airburst
129	255	MW 19830	22 November 1944	190	Impact
130	256	MW 19832	22 November 1944		Engine failure
131	257	MW 19862	23 November 1944	385	No data returned
132	258	MW 19866	23 November 1944	289	Airburst
133	260	MW 19833	24 November 1944	219	Impact
134	261	MW 19834	24 November 1944	35	Guidance failure
135		MW 19839	24 November 1944		Returned to Mittelwerk
136	262	MW 19835	25 November 1944	58	Guidance failure
137	259	MW 19864	25 November 1944	323	No data returned
138	263	MW 19836	26 November 1944	232	Impact
139		MW 19842	26 November 1944		Returned to Mittelwerk
140	267	MW 19861	26 November 1944	0	Exploded on pad
141	264	MW 19831	27 November 1944	235	Airburst
142	265	MW 19844	27 November 1944	230	Airburst
143	266	MW 19840	27 November 1944		Failure
144	269	MW 19827	28 November 1944	231	Airburst
145	268	MW 19868	28 November 1944	279	No data returned
146	270	MW 19841	29 November 1944	166	Impact
147	271	MW 19825	29 November 1944	231	Impact
148	274	MW 19873	29 November 1944	315	No data returned
149	272	MW 19846	30 November 1944	132	Failure
150	273	MW 19849	30 November 1944	232	Impact
151		MW 19826	30 November 1944		Returned to MW
December 1944
152	276	MW 19848	1 December 1944	214	Airburst
153	277	MW 19850	1 December 1944	2	Explosion after launch
154		MW 19869	1 December 1944		Returned to field station; leaking
155	275	MW 19302	1 December 1944	320	No data returned
156	278	MW 19301	4 December 1944	293	No data returned
157	279	MW 19883	5 December 1944	250	Airburst
158	280	MW 19893	5 December 1944	246	Impact
159	281	MW 19905	5 December 1944	251	Airburst
160	282	MW 19913	6 December 1944	167	Impact
161	283	MW 19891	6 December 1944		Failure
162	285	MW 19874	7 December 1944	349	No data returned
163	284	MW 19901	7 December 1944	224	Impact
164	285	MW 19894	8 December 1944	243	Impact
165	286	MW 19888	8 December 1944	215	Impact
166	290	MW 19020	9 December 1944	347	No data returned
167	287	MW 19900	9 December 1944	270	Impact
168	288	MW 19895	9 December 1944		Returned to Mittelwerk
169	291	MW 19856	11 December 1944	245	
170	292	MW 18783	11 December 1944	284	No data returned
171	293	MW 19855	12 December 1944	0	Exploded above pad
172	294	MW 19858	12 December 1944	243	
173	295	MW 19854	12 December 1944	246	
174		MW 19871	12 December 1944		Returned to field station
175	296	MW 19859	13 December 1944	244	
176	297	MW 19870	13 December 1944	239	
177	298	MW 19857	13 December 1944	68	Airburst
178	299	MW 19865	14 December 1944	1	Airburst
179	300	MW 19847	December 1944	230	Airburst
180	301	MW 19837	16 December 1944	216	Impact
181	302	MW 19838	16 December 1944	228	Airburst
182	303	MW 19851	17 December 1944	128	Failure
183	305	19828	19 December 1944	52	Failure
184	304	MW 19872	19 December 1944	243	
185	306	MW 19845	20 December 1944	0	Control failure at lift-off at15m height
186	307	MW 19852	20 December 1944	81	Guidance failure
187	308	MW 19853	20 December 1944	232	Airburst
188		MW 19186	21 December 1944	229	Impact
189		MW 19676	21 December 1944	260	Impact
190		MW 19778	21 December 1944	228	Impact
191		MW 19886	23 December 1944	232	Impact
192		MW 19674	23 December 1944	222	Impact
193		MW 19776	23 December 1944	224	Airburst
194		MW 19650	25 December 1944	225	Impact
195		MW 19681	25 December 1944	228	Airburst
196	309	MW 20853	27 December 1944	212	
197	310	MW 20844	28 December 1944	234	
198	311	MW 20845	28 December 1944	229	
199	312	MW 20848	28 December 1944		Failed
200	313	MW 20820	30 December 1944	230	
201	314	MW 20816	30 December 1944	231	
202	315	MW 20847	31 December 1944	226	
203	316	MW 20825	31 December 1944	227	
January 1945
204	317	MW 20852	1 January 1945	34	Failed
205		Ma419 ( MW 20843)	1 January 1945		Attempt abandoned - launched on 8 January 1945
206	318	MW 20815	2 January 1945	232	
207	319	MW 20817	2 January 1945	232	
208	320	MW 20818	2 January 1945	231	
209	321	MW 20838	3 January 1945	229	
210	322	MW 20841	3 January 1945	224	
211	323	MW 20851	3 January 1945	223	
212	324	MW 20823	4 January 1945	228	
213	325	MW 20814	4 January 1945		Failed soon after launch
214	326	MW 20843	8 January 1945	231	
215	327	MW 20819	8 January 1945	234	
215	330	MW 20705	10 January 1945	215	
216	331	MW 20808	10 January 1945	56	Failed
217	332	MW 20809	10 January 1945	227	
218	334	MW 20810	11 January 1945	226	
219	335	MW 20807	11 January 1945	161	Failed
220	336	MW 20811	11 January 1945	231	
221	337	MW 20804	11 January 1945	223	
222	338	MW 20806	11 January 1945	226	High altitude airburst
223		MW 20824	11 January 1945		Abandoned
224		MW 20812	11 January 1945		Abandoned

== Operation Backfire launches near Cuxhaven ==
For Operation Backfire, the British collected from Mittlwerk and areas under British control sufficient parts to assemble a small number of V-2s to be launched by German personnel so Allies could learn of the handling and launching of the rockets. The final launch was a demonstration for representatives of the United States, USSR, France, and the press.

Date	Launch time	Maximum height	Length of flight	Remarks
2 October 1945	14:41	69.4 km (43.1 mi)	249.4 km (155.0 mi)	
4 October 1945	14:16	17.4 km (10.8 mi)	24 km (15 mi)	Engine failure soon after launch.
15 October 1945	15:06	64 km (40 mi)	233 km (145 mi)	Operation Clitterhouse. V-2 performed as planned and landed near target point in the North Sea

== Launches of captured V-2 rockets in the United States after 1945 ==
The Upper Atmosphere Research Panel performed experiments on US flights of V-2s.

Rocket number	Date	Launch site	Pad	Maximum altitude (kilometres)	Remarks
1946
1	15 March 1946	White Sands		n/a	Static test firing of V-2 Engine.
2	16 April 1946	White Sands	Pad 33	5.5	Radio cut-off 19.5 s after launch, Fin 4 failed prior to termination.
3	10 May 1946	White Sands	Pad 33	112.6	Nominal flight.
4	29 May 1946	White Sands	Pad 33	112.1	Nominal flight.
5	13 June 1946	White Sands	Pad 33	117.4	Nominal flight.
6	28 June 1946	White Sands	Pad 33	107.8	Nose separation failure
7	9 July 1946	White Sands	Pad 33	134.4	Nominal performance.
8	19 July 1946	White Sands	Pad 33	4.824	Oxygen pump exploded.
9	30 July 1946	White Sands	Pad 33	161.5	Nominal performance.
10	15 August 1946	White Sands	Pad 33	6.4	Radio termination 16.5 s after launch.
11	22 August 1946	White Sands	Pad 33	0	Control failure resulted in termination command at 6.5s.
12	10 October 1946	White Sands	Pad 33	173.8	Nominal performance.
13	24 October 1946	White Sands	Pad 33	104.6	Sub-normal propulsion performance, camera made the first picture of Earth from outer space.
14	7 November 1946	White Sands	Pad 33	0.32	Guidance failure preceded emergency termination at 31s.
15	21 November 1946	White Sands	Pad 33	101.4	Sub-normal propulsion performance.
16	5 December 1946	White Sands	Pad 33	152.9	Control system failed at altitude.
17	17 December 1946	White Sands	Pad 33	183.4	Rocket exploded at 440s.
1947
18	10 January 1947	White Sands	Pad 33	116.2	Degraded performance caused roll rate of 60 rpm.
19	23 January 1947	White Sands	Pad 33	49.9	Degraded performance caused roll rate of 80 rpm.
20	20 February 1947	White Sands	Pad 33	109.4	Blossom 1 - Propulsion degraded at 55.5s.
21	7 March 1947	White Sands	Pad 33	162.5	Nominal performance.
22	1 April 1947	White Sands	Pad 33	129.2	Nominal performance.
23	8 April 1947	White Sands	Pad 33	102.2	Nominal performance.
24	17 April 1947	White Sands	Pad 33	142.4	Successful test of ram-jet payload.
26	15 May 1947	White Sands	Pad 33	135.2	Internal explosion at 64.3s.
H-II # 0	29 May 1947	White Sands	Pad 33	79.3	Hermes II prototype with dummy Organ ramjet test. Lost control after 4s and crashed outside range near Juarez, Mexico.
29	10 July 1947	White Sands	Pad 33	16.25	Early yaw led to termination at 32s.
30	29 July 1947	White Sands	Pad 33	160.7	Near vertical trajectory.
28	6 September 1947	USS Midway		1.5	Operation Sandy. Aircraft carrier launch successful. Exploded at 1524 m.
27	9 October 1947	White Sands	Pad 33	156.1	Internal explosion at 83.5s.
GE-Sp	20 November 1947	White Sands	Pad 33	26.7	GE technology proving flight.
28	8 December 1947	White Sands	Pad 33	104.6	Stable flight but less than planned altitude.
1948
34	22 January 1948	White Sands	Pad 33	159.3	Payload separation failure.
36	6 February 1948	White Sands	Pad 33	111	Successfully manoeuvred by ground control for first 40s of flight.
39	19 March 1948	White Sands	Pad 33	5.5	Low altitude flight prevented any data recovery.
25	2 April 1948	White Sands	Pad 33	144	Three previous launch attempts failed in year prior. Excellent performance.
38	19 April 1948	White Sands	Pad 33	56	Faulty steering caused high roll rate and then flight termination.
Bumper-1	13 May 1948	White Sands	Pad 33	127.3	Bumper 1 Premature cut-off of WAC 2nd stage.
35	27 May 1948	White Sands	Pad 33	139.7	Steady flight with low roll rate.
37	11 June 1948	White Sands	Pad 33	62.3	Blossom No. 3 (Albert I monkey) - Cut-off at 57.7s; payload separation at 96s.
40	26 July 1948	White Sands	Pad 33	86.9	Turbine overspeed caused premature propellad termination at 61s. 2rpm roll began at 70s.
43	5 August 1948	White Sands	Pad 33	165.7	Nominal performance.
Bumper-2	19 August 1948	White Sands	Pad 33	13.4	Bumper 2 First stage failed due to propellant flow interruption.
33	2 September 1948	White Sands	Pad 33	150.6	Vehicle broke up at 370s at 84 km altitude.
Bumper-3	30 September 1948	White Sands	Pad 33	150.3	Bumper 3 WAC stage failed.
Bumper-4	1 November 1948	White Sands	Pad 33	4.8	Bumper 4 Explosion in tail of V-2.
44	18 November 1948	White Sands	Pad 33	145.3	First Hermes B 'Organ' test of ramjet diffuser in place of payload section. Nominal performance.
42	9 December 1948	White Sands	Pad 33	108.4	Vane failure at 22s caused erratic flight.
1949
H-II # 1	13 January 1949	White Sands	Pad 33		1st Hermes II test.
45	28 January 1949	White Sands	Pad 33	59.9	Defective performance.
48	17 February 1949	White Sands	Pad 33	100.6	Nominal performance.
Bumper-5	24 February 1949	White Sands	Pad 33	129	Successful flight. Separation of stages at 32.2 km.
41	21 March 1949	White Sands	Pad 33	133.5	Blossom - Parachute not ejected.
50	11 April 1949	White Sands	Pad 33	87.2	Degraded performance from 43s.
Bumper-6	21 April 1949	White Sands	Pad 33	49.9	Premature V-2 cut-off; WAC stage failed to fire.
46	5 May 1949	White Sands	Pad 33	8.85	Second Hermes II 'Organ' test of ramjet diffuser in place of payload section.
47	14 June 1949	White Sands	Pad 33	133.5	Blossom No. 4B (Albert II monkey)- Nominal performance.
32	16 September 1949	White Sands	Pad 33	4.2	Blossom No. 4C - payload. Explosions caused early termination.
49	29 September 1949	White Sands	Pad 33	150.8	Nominal performance.
H-II # 2	6 October 1949	White Sands	Pad 33		2nd Hermes II test.
56	18 November 1949	White Sands	Pad 33	123.9	Nominal performance.
31	8 December 1949	White Sands	Pad 33	130.3	Blossom - Excellent performance.
1950
53	17 February 1950	White Sands	Pad 33	148.7	Nominal performance.
Bumper-8	24 July 1950	Cape Canaveral	LC 3	16.1	Low-angle atmospheric flight over 320 km range.
Bumper-7	29 July 1950	Cape Canaveral	LC 3	16.1	Low-angle atmospheric flight over 320 km range.
51	31 August 1950	White Sands	Pad 33	136.4	Blossom - Nominal performance.
61	26 October 1950	White Sands	Pad 33	8	Explosion at 50s at Mach 3 terminated flight.
H-II # 3	11 November 1950	White Sands	Pad 33		3rd and Final Hermes II test.
1951
54	18 January 1951	White Sands	Pad 33	1.6	Stalled on pad for 13s then rose slowly for 38s before exploding.
57	8 March 1951	White Sands	Pad 33	3.1	Blossom - Three explosions at 15.5; 18.5 and 19.5s destroying tail section.
55	14 June 1951	White Sands	Pad 33	0	Exploded on pad at start of main-stage thrust after rising 6-inches.
52	28 June 1951	White Sands	Pad 33	5.8	Blossom - Tail explosion at 8s and then cut-off signal given at 22s.
TF-1	22 August 1951	White Sands	Pad 33	213.4	Army training test (last 5 launches by "Broomstick Scientists")
60	29 October 1951	White Sands	Pad 33	140.9	Army training test. Payload released but damaged on impact.
1952
59	20 May 1952	White Sands	Pad 33	103.5	Army training test. * Also designated TF-2
TF-3	22 August 1952	White Sands	Pad 33	78	Army training test. Thrust decreased after 53s. Tail separation at 217s.
TF-5	19 September 1952	White Sands	Pad 33	27	Army training test. Tail explosion at 27s terminating thrust.

== Launches of V2 by the Soviet Union ==
The USSR captured the V-2 production facility at Nordhausen and assembled their own V-2s. Subsequently, they moved the equipment to the USSR and developed their own copy, the missile R-1.

Rocket number	Date	Launch site	Range (km)	Remarks
T-01	18 October 1947	Kapustin Yar	207	Vehicle disintegrated at atmospheric reentry.
T-02	20 October 1947	Kapustin Yar	231	Deviated 181 kilometres from intended flight path.
T-03	23 October 1947	Kapustin Yar	29	Observation of vehicle was hampered by low cloud cover. Vehicle disintegrated, possibly due to the warhead failure.
T-04	28 October 1947	Kapustin Yar	29	Success.
T-05	31 October 1947	Kapustin Yar	2	Started rolling after lift-off and crashed.
T-06	2 November 1947	Kapustin Yar	260	Success.
T-07	2 November 1947	Kapustin Yar	260	Lost fins after launch.
T-08	4 November 1947	Kapustin Yar	268	Success.
T-09	10 November 1947	Kapustin Yar	24	Control failure.
T-10	13 November 1947	Kapustin Yar	270	Broke up upon re-entry. Landed within 180 m of target.
T-11	13 November 1947	Kapustin Yar	270	Launched 5 hours after previous rocket and landed within 700 m of target.
