= Outline of rocketry =

Overview of and topical guide to rocketry

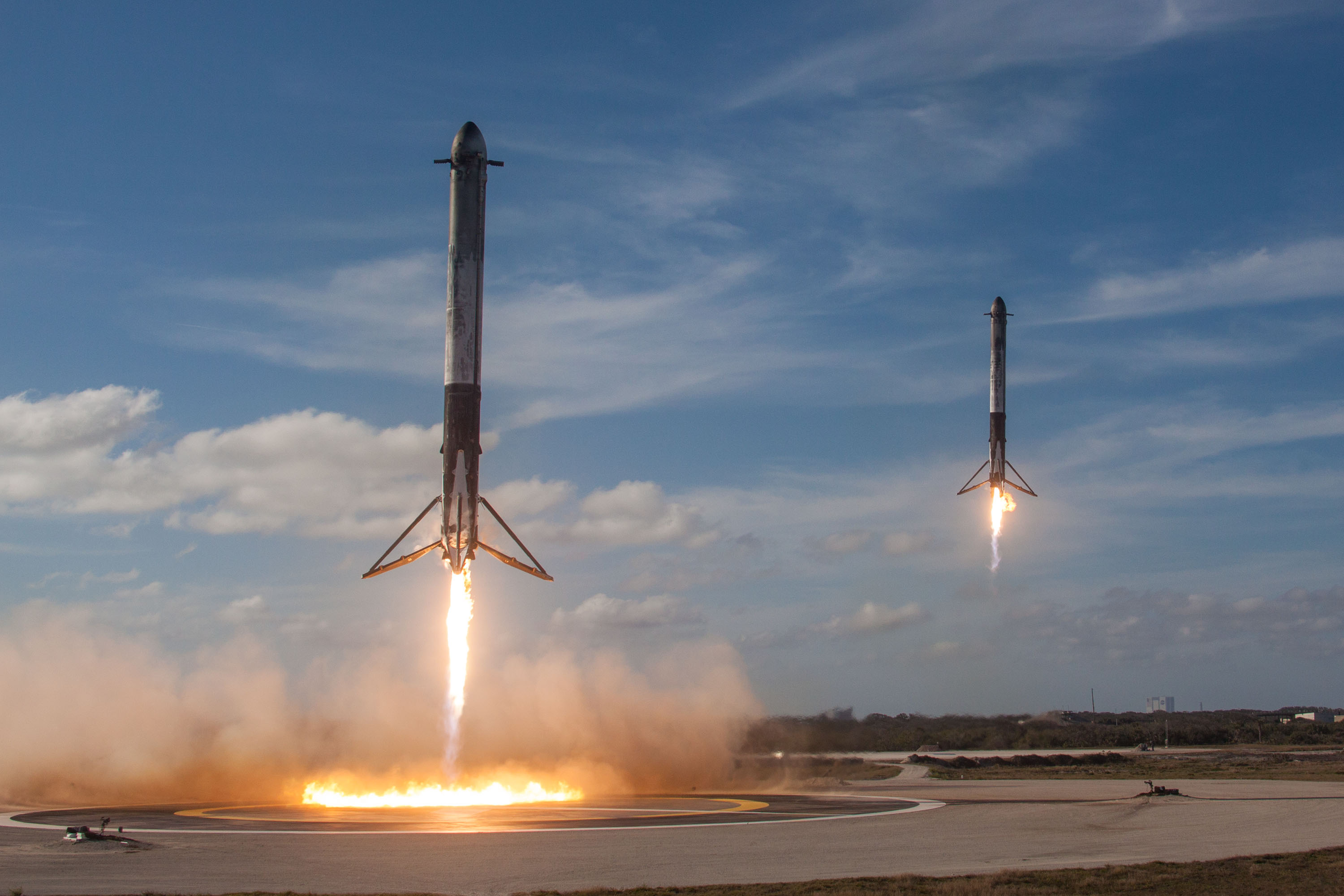
Liquid rocket boosters of Falcon Heavy are landing simultaneously on land

The following outline is provided as an overview of and topical guide to rocketry:

Rocketry – The design and construction of rockets and rocket engines, and the vehicles, missiles, and other items propelled by them.

== Essence of rocketry ==
- Aerospace engineering
- High tech
- Rocket
- Rocket engine
- Spaceport

== History of rocketry ==
- List of Ariane launches
- List of Atlas launches
- List of Black Brant launches
- List of Falcon 9 and Falcon Heavy launches
- List of Long March launches
- List of Proton launches
- List of R-7 launches
- List of Scout launches
- List of Space Launch System launches
- List of Thor and Delta launches
- List of Titan launches
- List of Zenit launches
- Vergeltungswaffe
- V-1 flying bomb
- V-2 rocket
  - List of V-2 test launches
  - List of V-2 launches in the United States

== Rocket components ==
- Adapter (rocketry)
- Booster (rocketry)
  - Liquid rocket booster
  - Solid rocket booster
- Fin
  - Grid fin
- Payload fairing
- Rocket engine
  - Apogee kick motor
  - Dual-thrust
  - Rocket turbine engine
  - Thrust curve

== Rocket manufacturers ==
- Boeing
- Indian Space Research Organisation
- Lockheed Martin
- Northrop Grumman
- Rocket Lab
- Roscosmos
- SpaceX

== Rockets by type ==
- Propellant
  - Hybrid-propellant rocket
  - Liquid-propellant rocket
  - Solid-propellant rocket
- Reusability
  - Expendable launch system
  - Reusable launch system
- Role
  - Launch escape system
  - Launch vehicle
  - Missile
  - Model rocket
  - Rocket (weapon)
  - Sounding rocket

== Spaceports ==
- Baikonur Cosmodrome
  - Gagarin's Start
  - Site 31
  - Site 41
  - Site 45
  - Site 81
  - Site 90
  - Site 109
  - Site 110
  - Site 200
  - Site 250
- Cape Canaveral Air Force Station
  - Space Launch Complex 37
  - Space Launch Complex 40
  - Space Launch Complex 41
- Kennedy Space Center
  - Launch Complex 39
    - Launch Complex 39A
    - Launch Complex 39B
  - Launch Complex 48
- Pacific Spaceport Complex – Alaska
- Rocket Lab Launch Complex 1
- Satish Dhawan Space Centre
  - First Launch Pad
  - Second Launch Pad
  - SLV Launch Pad
  - Third Launch Pad
- Vandenberg Air Force Base
  - Space Launch Complex 1
  - Space Launch Complex 2
  - Space Launch Complex 3
  - Space Launch Complex 4
  - Space Launch Complex 5
  - Space Launch Complex 6
  - Space Launch Complex 8
  - Space Launch Complex 10

== See also ==
- Outline of aerospace
- Outline of space exploration
