= Outline of aerospace =

Overview of and topical guide to aerospace

The following outline is provided as an overview of and topical guide to the aerospace field:

Aerospace – comprises the atmosphere of Earth and surrounding space. Typically the term is used to refer to the aerospace industry, which researches, designs, manufactures, operates, and maintains vehicles moving through air and space. The aerospace field is diverse, with a multitude of commercial, industrial, and military applications.

== Essence of aerospace ==
Aerospace

- Aircraft
- Atmosphere
- Geocentric orbit
- Space
- Spacecraft

== Aerospace industries and applications ==
- Air transport
- Aerospace manufacturing
- Space exploration

== Subdisciplines of the aerospace field ==
- General aviation
- Aeronautics
- Astronautics
- Aerospace engineering
- Avionics

== Aerospace organizations ==
=== Space agencies ===
- NASA
- ESA
- Canadian Space Agency
- Indian Space Research Organization
- Russian Federal Space Agency (RKA)
- China National Space Administration
- Iranian Space Agency
- German Aerospace Center
- United Kingdom Space Agency

=== Aerospace companies ===
- Aerospace manufacturers
  - Airbus
  - Boeing
  - Bombardier Aerospace
  - Embraer
  - Lockheed Martin
  - Northrop Grumman
- Air transport companies
  - Lists of airlines

=== Aerospace schools ===
- List of aerospace engineering schools

== History of aerospace ==
History of aerospace

- Timeline of aviation
- Timeline of space exploration
- Discovery and exploration of the Solar System
- Timeline of Solar System exploration
- Wright brothers, Kittyhawk, Wright Glider
- Vergeltungswaffe
- V-1 flying bomb
- V-2 rocket
  - List of V-2 test launches
  - List of V-2 launches in the United States
- Project Vanguard
- Sputnik, Sputnik crisis
- Space race
- Operation Paperclip
- List of communications satellite firsts
- Apollo program
- List of Proton launches
- List of Thor and Delta launches
- List of R-7 launches
- List of Falcon 1 launches
- List of NRO Launches
- List of Atlas launches
- List of Long March launches
- List of Black Brant launches
- List of Titan launches
- List of Ariane launches
- List of GPS satellite launches
- Skylab
- History of the International Space Station
  - Origins of the International Space Station
  - Assembly of the International Space Station
  - List of ISS spacewalks
- List of spacewalks and moonwalks
- List of cumulative spacewalk records

== Future of aerospace ==
=== United States ===
Vision for Space Exploration

- Develop Shuttle-Derived Launch Vehicles
- Explore the Moon with robotic spacecraft missions by 2008 and crewed missions by 2020
- Transiting Exoplanet Survey Satellite (planned launch for 2018)
- Explore Mars and other destinations with robotic and crewed missions
- Psyche (spacecraft) (planned for 2022)

== General aerospace concepts ==
- Aerospace architecture
- Aerospace physiology
- Aircraft
- Atmospheric reentry
- Aviation
- Space program
- Satellites
- Spacecraft
- SpaceShipOne
- Wind tunnel
- List of orbital launch systems
- Aerodynamics
- Flight principles
- Aviation fuels
- Sustainable Aviation

== Persons influential in aerospace ==
- Elon Musk
- Burt Rutan
- more...

== See also ==
- Index of aerospace engineering articles
- Outline of rocketry
