= V4 =

V4 or V-4 may refer to:

== Science and technology ==
- LNER Class V4, a class of British steam locomotives
- V4 engine, a V engine with four cylinders in two banks of two cylinders
- Visual area V4, in the visual cortex
- Klein four-group, in mathematics
- ITU-T V.4, a telecommunication recommendation
- ATC code V04 Diagnostic agents, a subgroup of the Anatomical Therapeutic Chemical Classification System
- The V4 JavaScript engine for QML
- V_{4}, one of six precordial leads in electrocardiography
- V-4 (rocket launch), first mostly-successful launch of the V-2 rocket

== Other uses ==
- Visegrád Group, an alliance of four Central European states - Czech Republic, Hungary, Poland and Slovakia
- Rheinbote or V-4, a German World War II four-stage missile
- Saint Kitts and Nevis (ITU prefix)
- Vieques Air Link (IATA airline code)
- V4, a grade (climbing) for difficulty of a boulder climbing route

== See also ==
- 4V (disambiguation)
