= MW 18014 =

1944 German rocket that entered space

- Mission type: Test launch
- Operator: Wehrmacht
- Apogee: 176 km (109 miles)

Spacecraft properties
- Spacecraft: MW 18014
- Spacecraft type: A-4/V-2 (Note: V-2 rockets were still known as A-4s until September 1944.)
- Manufacturer: Mittelwerk GmbH
- Launch mass: 12,500 kg

Start of mission
- Launch date: 20 June 1944
- Launch site: Peenemünde Army Research Center

End of mission
- Disposal: Impact
- Destroyed: 20 June 1944

MW 18014 was a German V-2 rocket launched on 20 June 1944, at the Peenemünde Army Research Center in Peenemünde. It was the first man-made object to reach outer space, attaining an apogee of 176 kilometres (109 mi), well above the Kármán line that was established later as the lowest altitude of space. As a vertical test launch that was not intended to reach orbital velocity, it returned and impacted Earth, making it the first sub-orbital spaceflight.

== Background ==
Early A-4 rockets, despite being able to reach altitudes of 90 km, had suffered from multiple reliability problems. For example, a design fault in the forward part of the outer hull caused it to regularly fail mid-flight, resulting in the failure of as many as 70% of test launches. On one occasion, an A-4 rocket suffering from pogo oscillations during ascent veered 90° off course, then spiralled back down to its launch pit, killing four launch troops on site.

The Peenemünde rocket team made a number of improvements to rectify the reliability problems during 1943 and the first half of 1944. Hindering the program were Allied raids as part of Operation Hydra, attempts to privatise the program during June 1944, frequent interference from the SS, and a two-week detention of technical director Wernher von Braun on 15 March 1944.

Allied advances in Northern France, improvements of the Mittelwerk underground facility, where the A-4 rockets were produced, and improvements of the liquid-propellant formula renewed emphasis on Von Braun to address the A-4's reliability problems.

== Records exceeded ==
MW 18014 was part of a series of vertical test launches made during June 1944 designed to gauge the rocket's behaviour in vacuum. MW 18014 exceeded the altitude record set by one of its predecessors (launched on 3 October 1942) to attain an apogee of 176 km.

MW 18014 was the first human-made object to cross into outer space, as defined by the 100 km Kármán line. This particular altitude was not considered significant at the time; the Peenemünde rocket scientists rather celebrated test launch V-4 in October 1942, first to reach the thermosphere. After the war, the Fédération Aéronautique Internationale (World Air Sports Federation) defined the boundary between Earth's atmosphere and outer space to be the Kármán line.

A subsequent A-4/V-2 launched as part of the same series of tests would exceed MW 18014's record, with an apogee of 189 km. The date of that launch is unknown because rocket scientists did not record precise dates during this phase.

== See also ==
- Albert II, first mammal in space, 14 June 1949
- Sputnik 1, first orbital space flight, 4 October 1957
- Vostok 1, first manned space flight, 12 April 1961
