= Alice King Chatham =

American sculptor and designer who worked in aviation and the U.S. space program

- Alice King Chatham, appearing on the television program To Tell the Truth in 1964
- Born: Alice King; March 28, 1908; Dayton, Ohio, USA
- Died: July 8, 1989 (aged 81); Marion, Ohio, US
- Resting place: Dayton, Ohio
- Education: Dayton Art Institute
- Occupations: Sculptor, designer
- Employers: Wright-Patterson Air Force Base; NASA; Douglas Aircraft Company
- Spouse: Joshua D. Chatham

Alice King Chatham (March 28, 1908 – July 8, 1989) was an American sculptor who worked for the United States Air Force, NASA, and their contractors to design helmets, oxygen masks and other personal protective equipment. The equipment she designed was used both on humans and on a variety of animal test subjects.

== Career ==
=== Wright-Patterson Air Force Base ===
Alice King was a graduate of the Dayton Art Institute. In 1942, she was contacted by officials at the Wright Patterson Air Force Base (WPAFB) near Dayton, Ohio to help design breathing masks for pilots. They sought her out because they wanted someone with a sculpture background to be involved with the design. She began work at the Aero Medical Laboratory at WPAFB, where she helped design and build the first successful pressurized breath masks for pilots operating planes above 20,000 feet (6,100 m). The pressurized mask was important to keep pilots from passing out at high altitude. Her work improved upon an earlier design by Dr. James P. Henry of the University of California that had not met the specifications needed by the Air Force. The mask she devised included pressurized air bladders around the ears that allowed pilots to operate at 55,000 feet (17,000 m) for 30 minutes. This represented a significant improvement over Henry's mask, which lacked the ear bladders and caused pilots pain after only 15 minutes at 40,000 feet (12,000 m).

=== X-plane projects ===
King was assigned to work on the X-1 project that resulted in Chuck Yeager's accomplishment of the first transsonic flight. She further improved the helmet design to use rigid plexiglass around the ears; this design was found to be effective at a simulated altitude of 106,000 feet (32,000 m). These improvements were incorporated into the 1946 Army model S-1 flight suits built by the David Clark Company. Although several sources have reported that Chuck Yeager was wearing this S-1 suit during his first record-setting first transsonic flight, Yeager said that he wore only a regular flight suit and not a pressure suit for that effort; King Chatham's exact contributions materials used in the X-plane program are unclear.

=== Space program ===
Following her work for the Air Force, King Chatham went on to work for NASA and its contractor the Douglas Aircraft Company on projects for the space program. She designed the oxygen mask and harness used by Albert II, the rhesus monkey who was the first monkey and first mammal in space, during his June 14, 1949 flight. She also developed pressurized suits and helmets for the chimpanzees who were used to test ejection seats as part of Project Whoosh. In addition to these primates, King Chatham designed a suit for the St. Bernard used to test high-altitude parachutes. King Chatham's continued to work on designs for humans as well as animal subjects. She worked on the Sierra Sam early crash-test dummy. For Project Mercury, the first human spaceflight program in the United States, she made casts of the crew members' heads to create custom-fitted masks and helmets for each astronaut. Her work for the space program also included the development of stretch knit garments and a bed for use in space. In 1964, she appeared on the television program To Tell the Truth, and was asked about her experiences designing for space.

King Chatham applied her design experience in the space program to terrestrial science as well. She founded the Alice King Chatham Medical Arts, a company that manufactured harnesses, restraints, and other physiological equipment for both human and animal subjects in research environments.

== Death ==
Alice King Chatham died at a nursing home in Marion, Ohio, on 8 July 1989. She was preceded in death by her husband, Joshua D. Chatham.
