= 4V =

4V or 4-V may refer to:

- 4V, abbreviation for 4 volts
- 4V, abbreviation for 4-valve engine
- 4V, IATA code for Birdy Airlines
- Venera 4V-2 spacecraft
- Sun-4v, a model of Sun-4 workstation
- 6AL-4V, a type of titanium alloy
- 4V, a model of Toyota V engine
- 4V, abbreviation for QuatroV - TV Show
- 4V, the production code for the 1977 Doctor Who serial Horror of Fang Rock
- 4V: an ITU prefix for Haiti

== See also ==
- V4 (disambiguation)
