= RTV-G-4 Bumper =

Type of rocket

Bumper
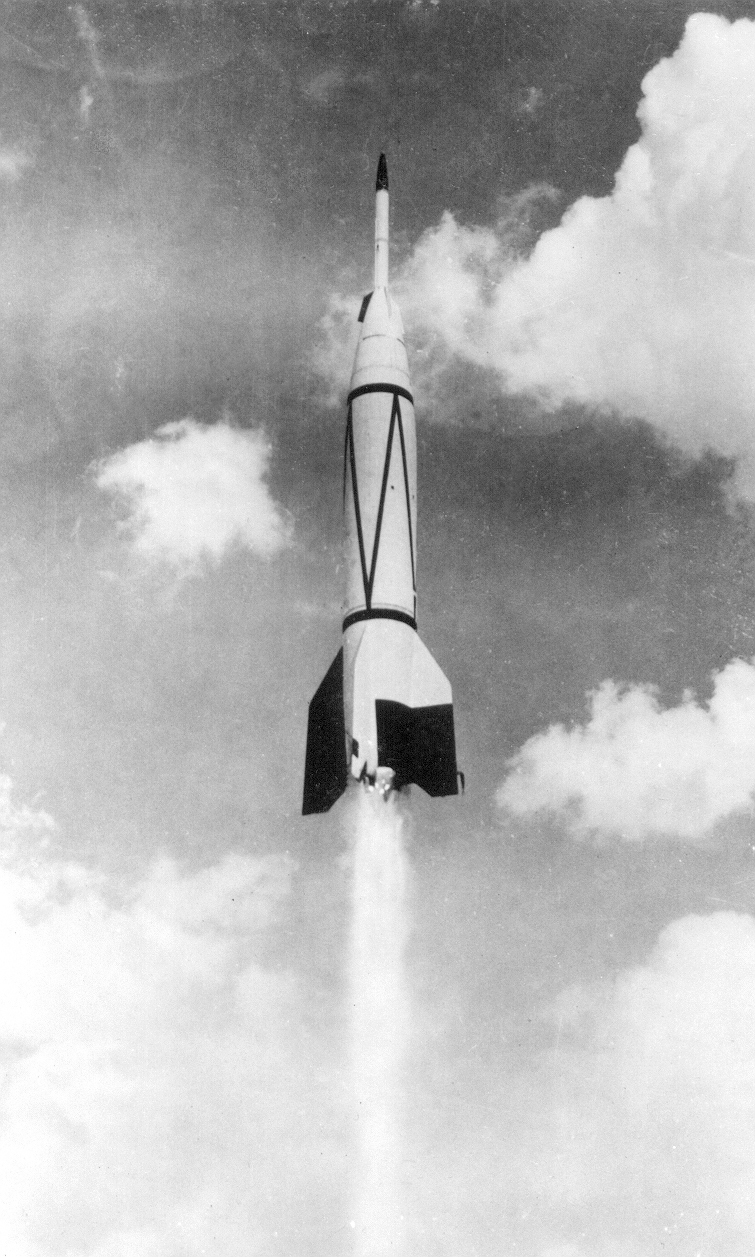
- Bumper 5, launched February 24, 1949
- Function: Sounding rocket
- Manufacturer: Army Ballistic Missile Agency
- Country of origin: Germany/United States

Size
- Height: 62 feet (19 m)
- Diameter: 5 feet 5 inches (1.65 m)

Launch history
- Status: Retired
- Launch sites: White Sands Proving Ground; Cape Canaveral
- Total launches: 8
- First flight: May 13, 1948
- Last flight: July 29, 1950

First stage - V-2 rocket
- Thrust: 27,200 kgf (267,000 N; 60,000 lbf)
- Burn time: 60s
- Propellant: 3,810 kg (8,400 lb) 75% ethanol* 25% water *4,910 kg (10,820 lb) liquid oxygen

Second stage Wac Corporal
- Thrust: 6.7 kN
- Burn time: 47s
- Propellant: Aerojet liquid-fuel

The RTV-G-4 Bumper was a sounding rocket built by the United States. A combination of the German V-2 rocket and the WAC Corporal sounding rocket, it was used to study problems pertaining to two-stage high-speed rockets. The Bumper program launched eight rockets between May 13, 1948, and July 29, 1950. The first six flights were conducted at the White Sands Missile Range; the seventh launch, Bumper 8 on July 24, 1950, was the first rocket launched from Cape Canaveral.

== Bumper program ==
=== Background ===
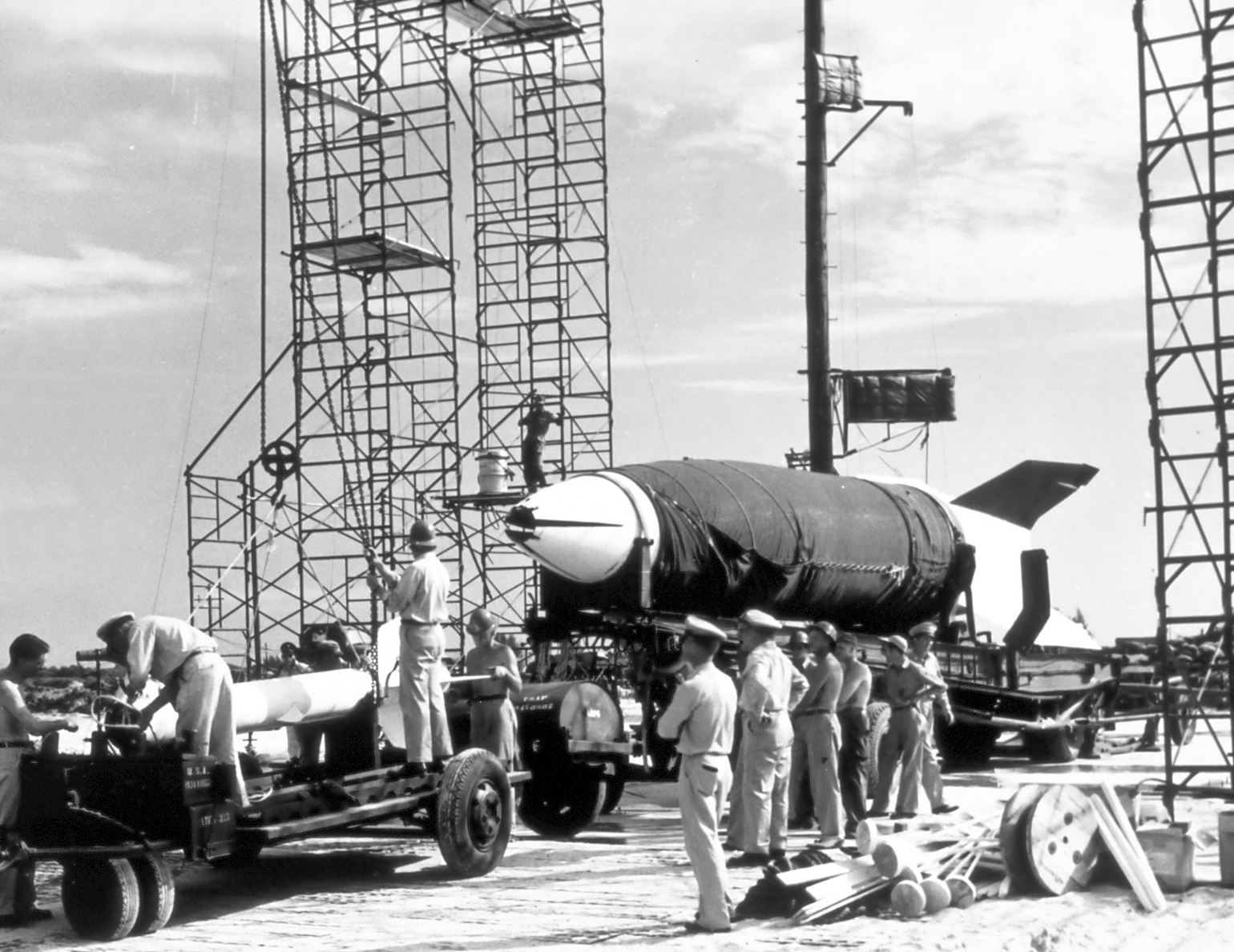
Bumper in two pieces: V-2 first stage behind WAC Corporal second stage

The Bumper program to produce and launch a two-stage combination of the V-2 and WAC Corporal rockets was conceived in July 1946 by Colonel Holger N. Toftoy. Both the WAC Corporal and the V-2 had been extensively tested at White Sands Proving Grounds, the WAC Corporal's launch series occurring in late 1945/early 1946 and the V-2 launches beginning March 15, 1946.

Bumper was started on June 20, 1947, to:

- Investigate launching techniques for a two-stage missile and separation of the two stages at high velocity.
- Conduct limited investigation of high-speed high-altitude phenomena.
- Attain record-setting velocities and altitudes.

Bumper employed the V-2 as first stage and the WAC Corporal as second stage. In a typical flight, the V-2 engine would fire first, taking the Bumper combination to an altitude of 20 mi (32 km), at which point the WAC Corporal would be released under its own power. This separation occurred before V-2 Brennschluss (engine cutoff) to ensure that the WAC Corporal had a stable, actively controlled platform to lift off from, and also so that the V-2 would impart close to maximum possible speed to the Bumper's second stage. The V-2 rocket had a maximum altitude of around 100 mi (160 km), while the WAC Corporal without its solid rocket booster, had a theoretical maximum altitude of 25 mi (40 km) (43.5 mi (70.0 km) with). Together, Bumper could reach altitudes of more than twice those attainable by the V-2 alone.

Engineering and limited scientific results (for instance, air resistance at high altitude determined by the rocket's trajectory) would be obtained from the 25 lb (11 kg) telemetry payload carried by the WAC Corporal second stage. Though the Bumper program was not, itself, a secret, aspects of it were classified, particularly the way the WAC Corporal was fitted into the nose of the V-2.

=== Planning ===
Overall responsibility for the Bumper program was given to the General Electric Company and was included in the Hermes project. The Jet Propulsion Laboratory was assigned to perform the theoretical investigations required, design the second stage, and create the basic design of the separation system. The Douglas Aircraft Company was assigned to fabricate the second stage, and do detailed design and fabrication of the special V-2 rocket parts required.

No German engineers were directly involved with Project Bumper, though some worked on the initial studies regarding the mating of the V-2 and WAC corporal. Two women, Mary Taggard and Bea Sylvester, were on the Bumper team providing rocket (but not launch) support.

=== Operations ===
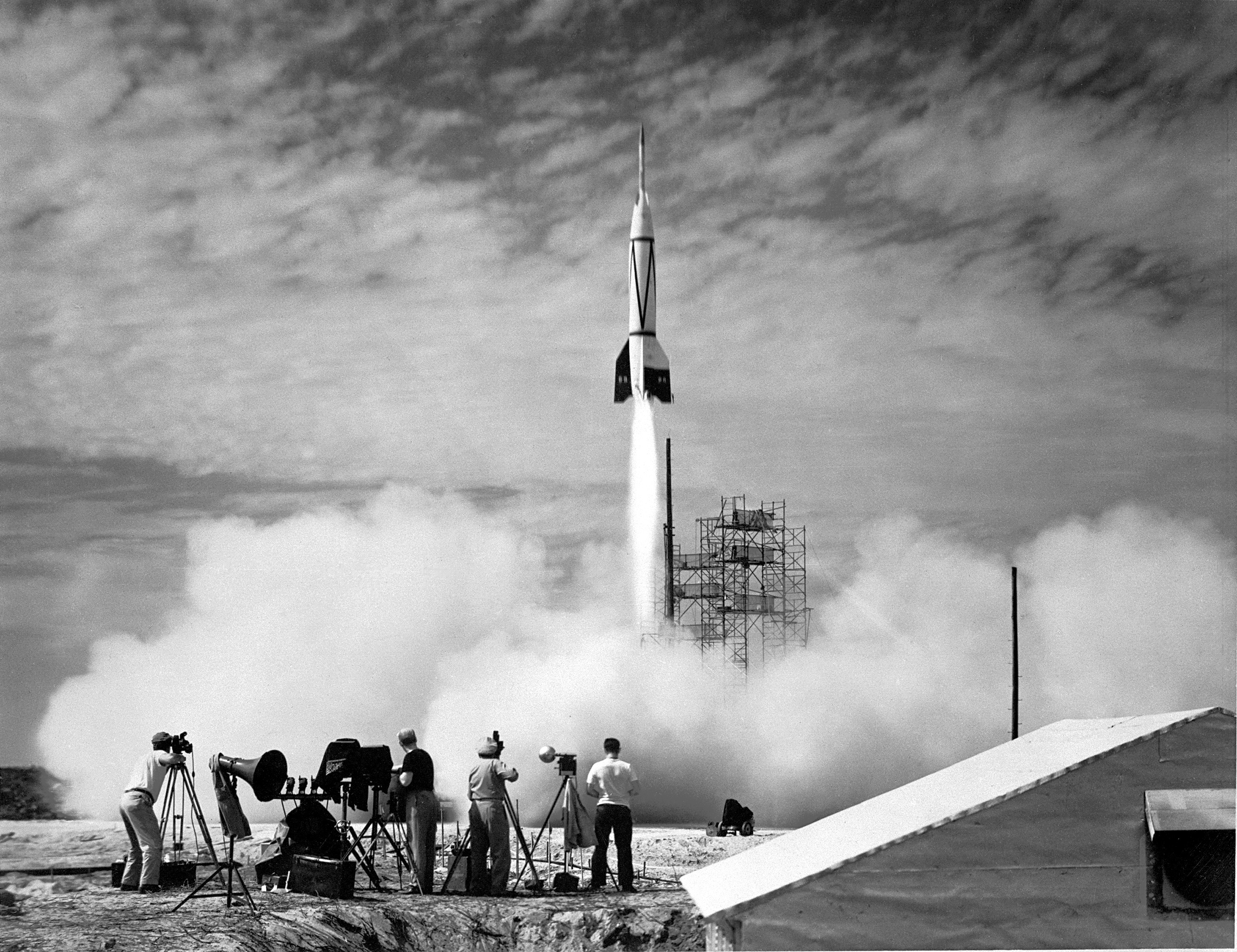
Test launch of a Bumper V-2.

Six Bumper launches were made from White Sands Proving Grounds. The first four, launched in 1947/48 were test flights of varying degrees of success. The first fully successful Bumper flight was the fifth in the series, launched at 3:14 P.M. (MST), February 24, 1949.

Bumper 5 was the first in the Bumper series to be launched with a fully fueled second stage. One minute after blast-off, at an altitude of 20 mi (32 km) and a speed of just under 1 mi (1.6 km) per second, the WAC Corporal detached from the V-2 first stage and fired its own engine. Forty seconds later, at second stage Brennschluss, the WAC Corporal had reached its maximum speed of 1.39 mi (2.24 km) per second. It reached its peak altitude of 250 mi (400 km), a world record, six and a half minutes after launch.

The V-2 first stage crashed into the New Mexico desert five minutes after launch 20 mi (32 km) north of its firing site. The WAC Corporal hit the ground 12 minutes after take-off 80 mi (130 km) from its launch pad. So great was its velocity upon impact, higher than any rocket to date, that the wreck was not found for analysis until January 1950.

In 1949, the Joint Long Range Proving Ground was established at Cape Canaveral Air Force Station on the east coast of Florida, where the last two Bumper launches would take place. On July 24, 1950, Bumper 8 became the inaugural launch of "the Cape", still in use as of 2023. Both Bumpers 8 and 7 (fired in that sequence, a week apart) were much ballyhooed in the American press.

Bumper 8 and 7 saw significant modifications to the WAC Corporal. The nose cone was coated in teflon, while the WAC Corporal body was coated in perlite to resist heating caused by atmospheric friction. Down range tracking was provided by the USS Sarsfield, which was positioned beneath the point where staging was to occur. Bumper 7 suffered the first pad abort at Cape Canaveral causing Bumper 8 to be launched first. Bumper 8 pitched over to an angle only 10 degrees above the horizon instead of the planned 22 degrees. From the tracking ship Sarsfield, the WAC Corporal's nose was observed to fail following second stage separation. There was no telemetry received following the separation and disintegration of the WAC Corporal.

Despite the failure of the WAC Corporal the flight was declared a success as the missile range facilities had all functioned as intended. As the WAC Corporal was still highly classified, its failure was not reported. Bumper 7 was launched a week later. Bumper 7's V-2 saw thrust decay while only 14 miles east of the Cape at an altitude of only 8.5 miles. As intended following V-2 thrust decay the WAC Corporal then fired for 40 seconds achieving only 3,286 mph, slightly over half the speed expected. Joint Long Range Proving Ground Commander Col. Harold R. Turner announced that the test was "a complete success in every way." The myth that the Bumper program at the Cape was a success, when in fact there were significant failures of the missiles, has continued to this day.

== Launch history ==
Bumper was launched eight times between 1948 and 1950.

List of Bumper launches
Designation	Date	Launch site	Apogee	Remarks	Image
Bumper 1	May 13, 1948	White Sands Pad 33	127.3 km (79.1 mi)	Test flight; WAC 2nd stage partially fueled.	
Bumper 2	August 19, 1948	White Sands Pad 33	13.4 km (8.3 mi)	First stage failed due to propellant flow interruption.	
Bumper 3	September 30, 1948	White Sands Pad 33	150.3 km (93.4 mi)	WAC stage failed.	
Bumper 4	November 1, 1948	White Sands Pad 33	4.8 km (3.0 mi)	Explosion in tail of V-2.	
Bumper 5	February 24, 1949	White Sands Pad 33	403 km (250 mi)	Successful flight. Separation of stages at 35 km (22 mi).	Bumper 5
Bumper 6	April 21, 1949	White Sands Pad 33	49.9 km (31.0 mi)	Premature V-2 cut-off; WAC stage failed to fire.	
Bumper 8	July 24, 1950	Cape Canaveral Pad 3	16.1 km (10.0 mi)	Low-angle atmospheric flight over 320 km (200 mi) range. First rocket launch from Cape Canaveral.	The first image taken of a rocket departing from Cape Canaveral was of Bumper 8. This image has been colored and remastered.
Bumper 7	July 29, 1950	Cape Canaveral Pad 3	16.1 km (10.0 mi)	Low-angle atmospheric flight over 320 km (200 mi) range.	Bumper 7

== See also ==
- Spaceflight before 1951
