= V-2 No. 13 =

Modified V-2 rocket

October 1946 V-2 rocket launch
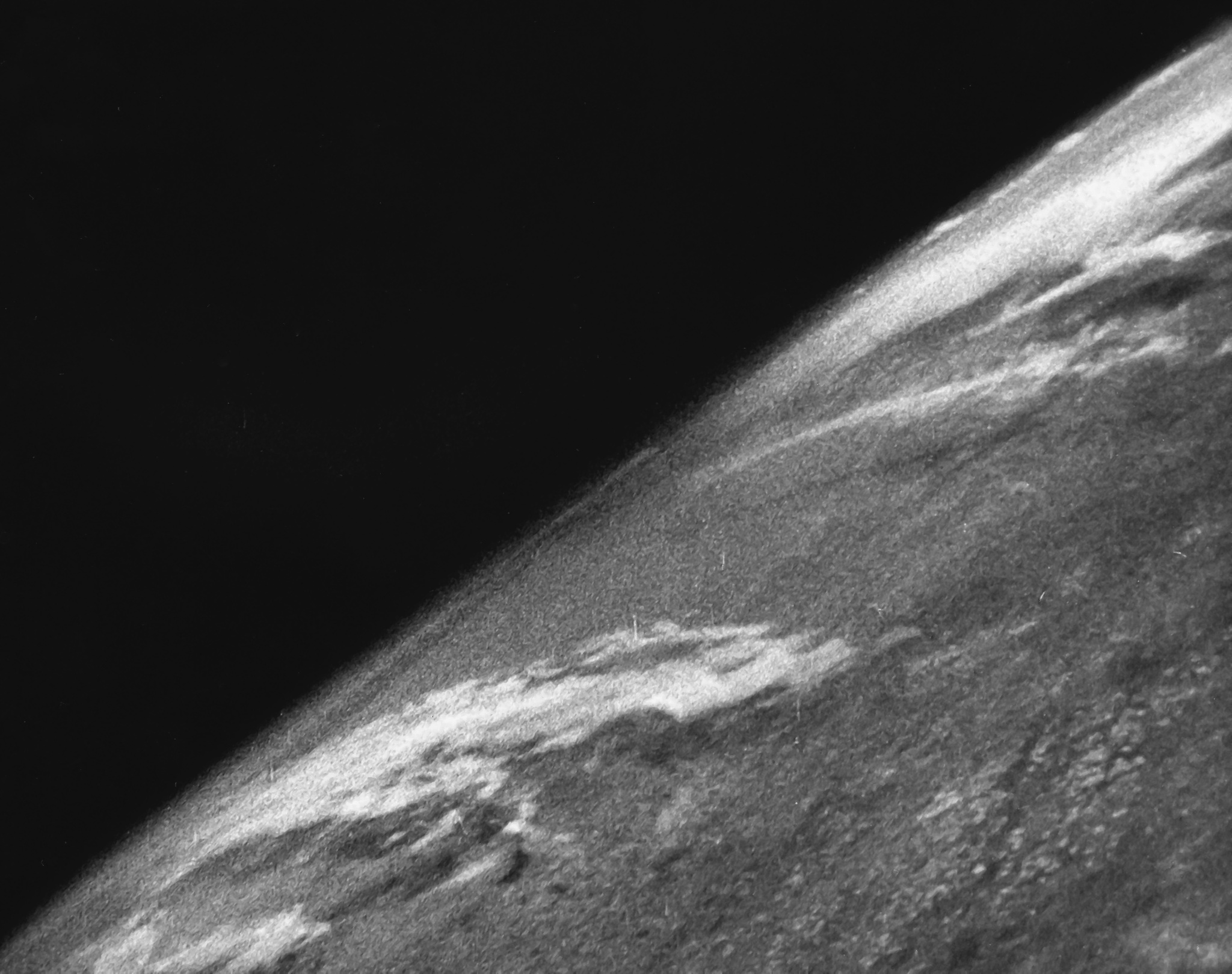
- The first photo of the Earth above the Kármán line, taken with a motion picture camera aboard the V-2 No. 13.

V-2 rocket launch
- Launch: 24 October 1946; 79 years ago
- Pad: White Sands Missile Range
- Outcome: Success
- Apogee: 65 miles (105 km)

Components
- Serial no.: 13

The V-2 No. 13 was a modified V-2 rocket that became the first object to take a photograph of the Earth from outer space. Launched on 24 October 1946, at the White Sands Missile Range in White Sands, New Mexico, the rocket reached a maximum altitude of 65 miles (105 km).

== Flight ==
Universal newsreel about the launch

The famous photograph was taken with an attached DeVry 35 mm black-and-white motion picture camera. The flight was an addition to the Hermes program which had been ongoing since 1944. Rocket V-2 No.13 was assembled and launched by General Electric company with both captured German components and re-manufactured ones.

== See also ==
- Astrophotography
- Timeline of first images of Earth from space
