= V-4 (rocket launch) =

1942 German A-4 test launch; first artificial object to reach the edge of space

- Mission type: Test launch
- Operator: Wehrmacht
- Apogee: 84.5 km (52.5 miles)

Spacecraft properties
- Spacecraft: V-4
- Spacecraft type: A-4
- Manufacturer: Mittelwerk GmbH
- Launch mass: 12,500 kg

Start of mission
- Launch date: 3 October 1942
- Launch site: Peenemünde Army Research Center

End of mission
- Disposal: Impact
- Destroyed: 3 October 1942

V-4 was the first mostly-successful launch of the Aggregat 4 rocket, later known as Vergeltungswaffe 2 (V-2). The launch occurred on the afternoon of 3 October 1942 and the rocket set a speed record of Mach 4, reached an apogee of 84.5 km (52.5 mi), thereby becoming the first artificial object to reach both the mesosphere and the thermosphere, surpassing the apogee of 42.3 km (26.3 mi) set by the Paris gun in 1918.

At the time, the V-4 launch was considered the first time a man-made object reached outer space (Geburtstag der Raumfahrt, "Birthday of spaceflight"). That evening, Walter Dornberger declared in a speech at Peenemunde,

This third day of October, 1942, is the first of a new era in transportation, that of space travel ...

In 1960, the World Air Sports Federation (FAI) defined a boundary for space at 100 km (62 mi) (approximately the highest possible altitude where an aircraft can fly at less than orbital velocity in order not to stall), while the United States' Air Force, NASA and Federal Aviation Administration consider 50 mi (80 km) the space boundary, the lower mesopause. The V-4 launch satisfied the present-day American definition, while it did not cross the FAI's 100 km line. The 100 km boundary was established much later however, and the V-4 trajectory did reach the Kármán altitude range (c. 83–100 km or 52–62 mi), of which the 100-kilometer boundary is simply a round-number approximation.

== See also ==
- List of V-2 test launches
- Spaceflight before 1951
- MW 18014 a V-2 launched 20 June 1944 reaching 176km, crossing into outer space
