= Albert I (monkey) =

First mammal launched on a rocket

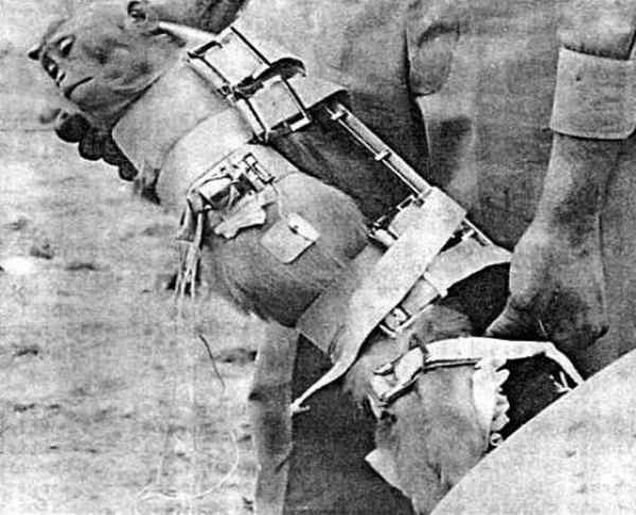
Albert I, shortly before launch

Albert I was a rhesus macaque monkey and the first mammal launched on a rocket (V-2 Rocket "Blossom No. 3") on June 11, 1948. The launch was staged at White Sands Proving Ground, Las Cruces, New Mexico. Albert I, a nine-pound monkey, was anesthetized and placed inside the rocket's crew capsule in the nose of the V-2 rocket. The flight did not reach outer space.

== Background ==
The Hermes program, beginning in 1944, had the stated objective of testing missiles, in particular reverse-engineering the German V-2 rocket. It was based out of White Sands in New Mexico and had launched 37 V-2 rockets prior to the launch of Albert I, 8 of which carried biological payloads consisting of seeds and/or fruit flies. Albert was the first mammal launched on a rocket by the United States, and would have been the first mammal in space had his flight been successful.

== Launch ==
The rocket, designated "missile number 37", launched at 03:22 on June 11, 1948. The systems intended to record Albert's respiratory functions had failed prior to launch, and there were indications that Albert had died due to the cramped nature of the capsule before the rocket had left the ground. The turbine had burnt out prematurely at 57.5 seconds, causing the rocket to fall short of the Kármán line, reaching an altitude of 39 mi (63 km). Post-flight investigations concluded that the likely cause of failure was an electrical fault causing the alcohol fuel supply to shut early. The parachute also failed to deploy, meaning that if Albert had survived the capsule conditions, he would have died on impact anyway.

== Results ==
The flight recorder had been recovered after the flight and indicated a complete lack of physiological activity, indicating that either Albert had died before the launch or that the entire biomonitoring system had failed. This meant that the launch had produced no useful data regarding the functioning of biological life in space, and was therefore deemed a failure.

The outcomes of the Albert I launch were used to prepare for the launch of Albert II on June 14, 1949, which successfully reached space on a suborbital flight. However, Albert II also died, due to a parachute failure, but the recorder indicated that he had survived the flight until that point.

== See also ==
- Monkeys and apes in space
- Animals in space
- Laika, a Russian space dog, the first animal to orbit the Earth (November 3, 1957)
- Albert II
- Ham, a chimpanzee, the first great ape in space (January 31, 1961)
- Enos, the first chimpanzee and third primate to orbit the Earth (November 29, 1961)
- List of individual monkeys
