= Churchill Rocket Research Range =

Canadian former rocket launch site

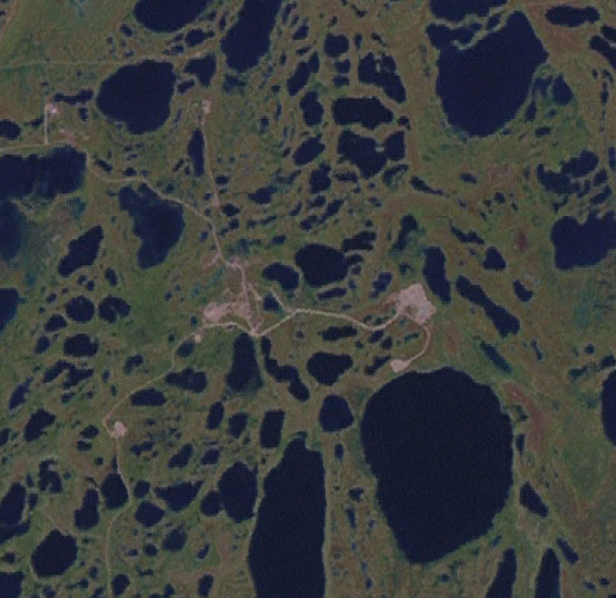
- Complex seen from Landsat 7 in June 2013
- Interactive map of Churchill Rocket Research Range
- Location: Near Churchill, Manitoba
- Coordinates: 58°44′03″N 93°49′13″W
- Short name: Fort Churchill
- Operator: Defence Research Board (1954-1958); United States Army (1959-1970); National Research Council (1970-1989); Akjuit Aerospace (1994-1998)
- Total launches: 3,500
- Launch pad: 4

National Historic Site of Canada
- Official name: Churchill Rocket Research Range National Historic Site of Canada
- Designated: 1988

The Churchill Rocket Research Range is a Canadian former rocket launch site located 23 kilometres (14 mi) outside Churchill, Manitoba. The facility was used by Canada and the United States beginning in 1954 for sub-orbital launches of sounding rockets to study the upper atmosphere. The site was scientifically beneficial due to lying in the centre of a zone containing high aurora activity. Over 3,500 sub-orbital flights were launched from the site.

The site is sometimes referred to as Fort Churchill after the nearby former military base (now Churchill Airport) and is connected by an all-weather gravel road to the town of Churchill.

== History ==
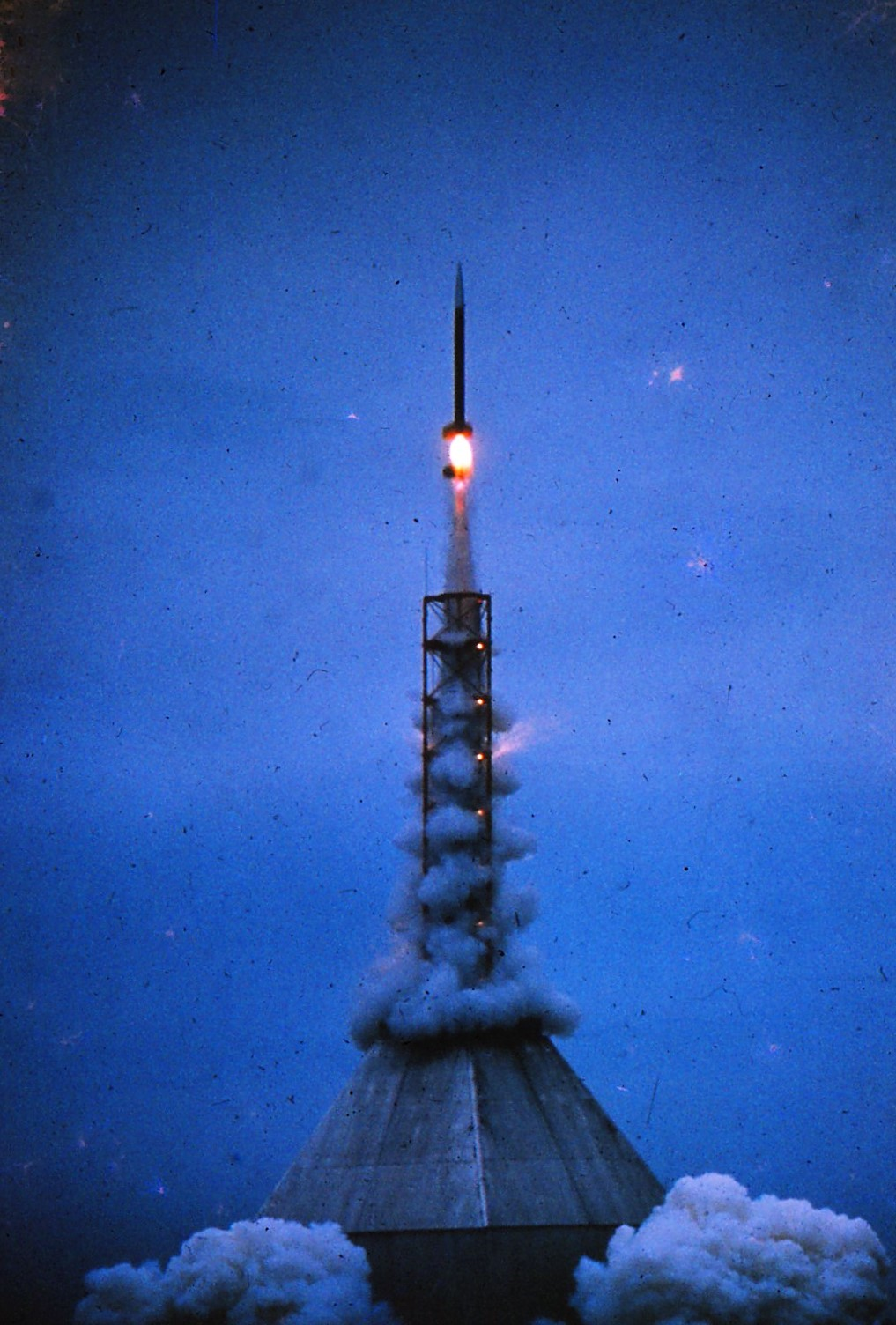
A rocket launching at the Churchill Rocket Research Range, c. 1965

The complex was first built in 1954 by the Canadian Army's Defence Research Board to study the effects of auroras on long distance communications. The programme shut down in 1955, but the site was re-opened and greatly expanded in 1956 as part of Canada's participation in the International Geophysical Year. Launches for the IGY experiments started in 1957, and the site was closed again in December 1958 when the IGY, which was actually two years long, ended.

The site was reopened again in August 1959 by the US Army, in collaboration with the Canadian government, as part of its network of sounding rocket stations. In September 1959 it was used to test CARDE's new solid fuel propellant systems with PVT-1, the vehicle that would evolve into the Black Brant. However, in late 1960 a fire destroyed many of the facilities. It was announced that the Black Brant test series would be continued with an additional twelve launches at NASA's Wallops Flight Facility during 1961-62, while the facilities at Churchill were rebuilt.

The US Army ended its involvement at Churchill in June 1970, and the site was taken over by the Canadian National Research Council to support the Canadian Upper Atmosphere Research Program. The site was used sporadically during the 1970s and 1980s, and was largely deserted by 1985.

=== SpacePort Canada: 1994-1998 ===
Akjuit Aerospace, a Canadian company founded in 1992, signed a 30-year lease with the Canadian government for the Churchill Rocket Research Range in 1994 with the goal of developing the world's first commercial spaceport. Akjuit assembled a "technical team" of 21 firms led by the American aerospace contractor Raytheon to plan the development of the site into SpacePort Canada, including polar orbital launch capability. Akjuit planned to launch commercial polar-orbiting payloads using Russian-made Start-1 rockets (so named as they were made of repurposed Soviet-era SS-25 ICBMs made redundant by the Strategic Arms Reduction Treaty). Churchill's location in the western hemisphere combined with its range-safety for firing northwards made it an ideal location, with the exception of the extremely cold weather which would limit launch seasons.

Akjuit's first and only rocket launch took place at 7:10 a.m. Central Time on April 28, 1998: a suborbital Black Brant IXB research rocket containing a physics payload for the Canadian Space Agency.

Akjuit Aerospace ceased operations in May 1998.

== Current uses ==
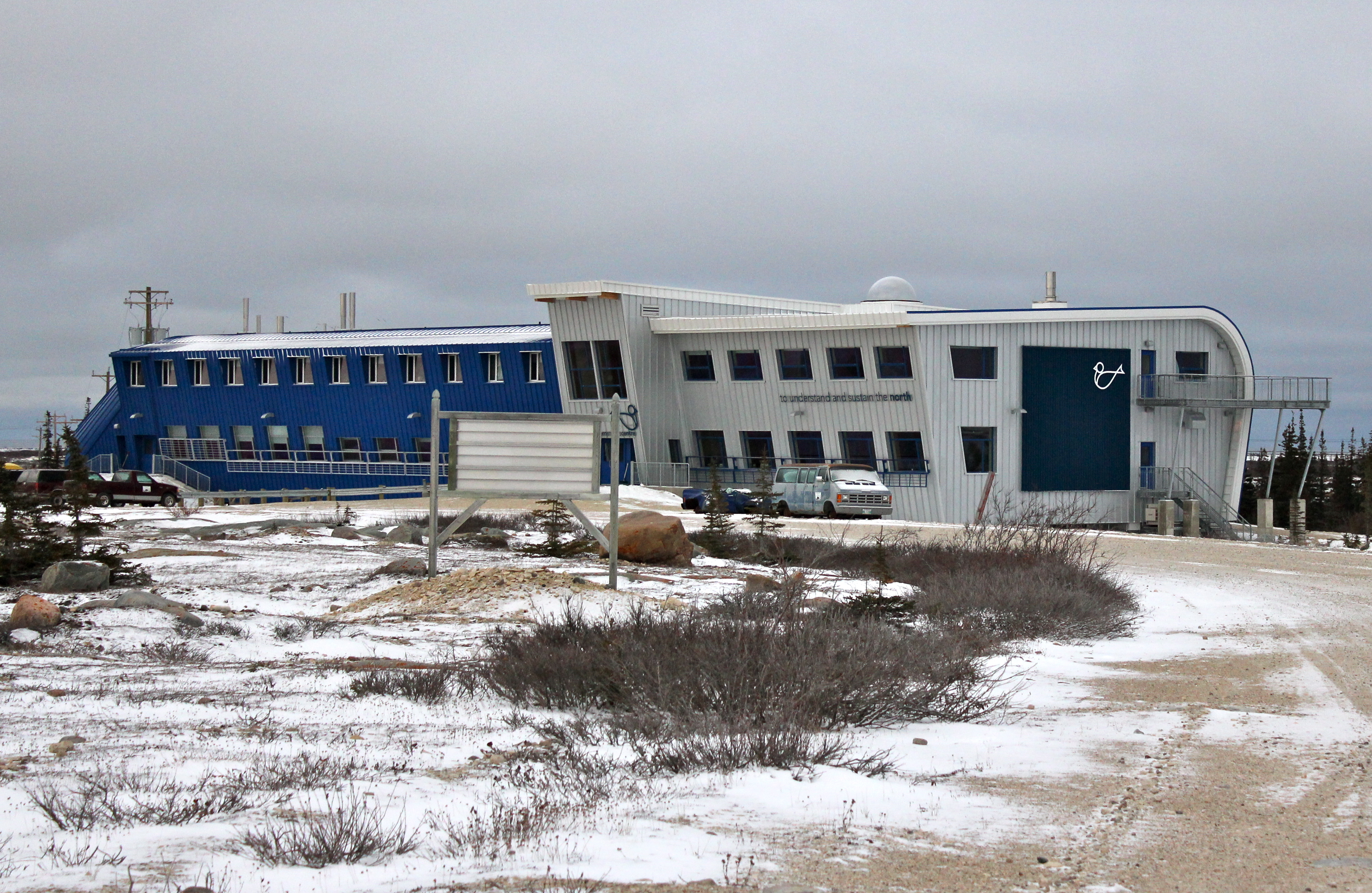
The Churchill Northern Studies Centre constructed on part of the rocket range property.

The site is no longer used for rocket launches and is currently the location of the Churchill Northern Studies Centre, a non-profit and multi-disciplinary research facility that is also open for educational tourism.
