= Operations Sandy and Pushover =

1947 US Navy test launch of a captured V-2 rocket from the carrier USS Midway

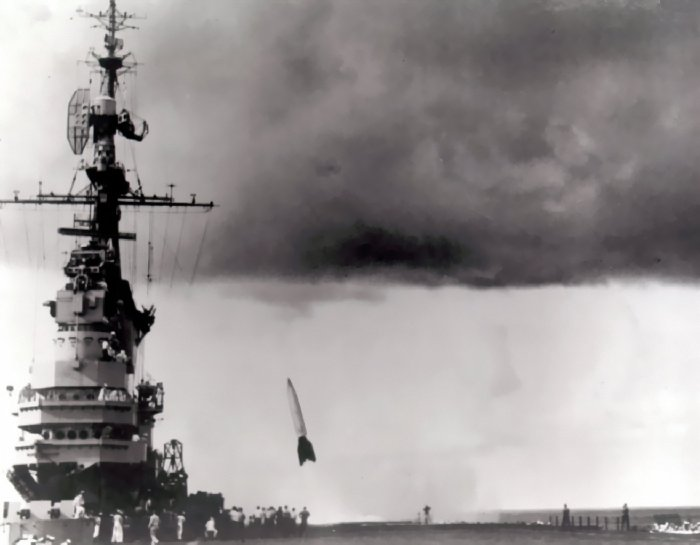
Launch of a captured V-2 rocket from deck of the U.S. Navy aircraft carrier USS Midway (CVB-41) during "Operation Sandy", 6 September 1947.

Operation Sandy was the codename for the post-World War II launch of a captured V-2 rocket from the deck of the United States Navy aircraft carrier USS Midway on September 6, 1947. It marked the first launch of a large rocket, and the only time for a V-2, from a ship at sea. Operation Pushover was a follow-up test in late 1949 to assess the danger to a carrier from a V-2 explosion.

== Operation Sandy ==
Rear Admiral Daniel V. Gallery, Assistant to the Chief of Naval Operations, was an early advocate of the concept. It was he who initiated Operation Sandy.

Preliminary testing was done at the White Sands Missile Range, using a simulated aircraft carrier deck. The V-2 to be used was assembled at White Sands. It was shipped across the country to the east coast and loaded aboard the Midway, then the largest carrier in the Navy and equipped with an armored flight deck. The aircraft carrier sailed to a point several hundred miles south of Bermuda for the launch.

After liftoff, the V-2 tilted at an angle and subsequently broke up at an altitude of 15,000 feet (4,600 m), disappointing the distinguished witnesses.

== Operation Pushover ==
Operation Pushover determined how much damage would result from a V-2 toppling or exploding on a carrier deck, using a simulated deck built at White Sands. In late 1949, a fully fueled V-2 was set on a pedestal with four legs, two of which were rigged with explosives to be "blown away just after ignition of the rocket motor." Pushover No. 2 repeated the test with the deck raised several feet.

== See also ==
- Photos and link to a newsreel account of Operation Sandy
- Photos of Sandy and Pushover
