= List of Black Brant launches =

This is a list of launches made by the Black Brant sounding rocket.

Date/Time (GMT)	Variant	Launch site	Serial	Mission	Outcome	Apogee	Remarks
September 1959	BB-I	Churchill	PTV-1	Test flight	Success	100 kilometres (62 mi)	Maiden flight of Black Brant I
12 October 1960	BB-II	Churchill	CC-2A-13	Auroral research	Success	100 kilometres (62 mi)	Maiden flight of Black Brant II
12 October 1960	BB-II	Churchill	CC-2A-14	Auroral research	Success	100 kilometres (62 mi)	
28 October 1960; 12:21	BB-I	Churchill		DRTE-05 - Ionosphere research	Success	90 kilometres (56 mi)	
15 June 1962	BB-III	Wallops Island	AA-3-2	Test flight	Failure	92 kilometres (57 mi)	Maiden flight of Black Brant III
15 June 1962	BB-III	Wallops Island	AA-3-1	Test flight	Failure	98 kilometres (61 mi)	
19 June 1962	BB-III	Wallops Island	AA-3-3	Test flight	Failure	100 kilometres (62 mi)	
28 June 1962	BB-III	Wallops Island	AA-3-4	Test flight	Failure	13 kilometres (8.1 mi)	
13 December 1962	BB-III	Wallops Island	AA-3-6	Test flight	Success	90 kilometres (56 mi)	
13 December 1962	BB-III	Wallops Island	AA-3-5	Test flight	Success	98 kilometres (61 mi)	
6 April 1963; 07:25	BB-I	Churchill	AD-1-23	Auroral research	Success	140 kilometres (87 mi)	
11 January 2008; 05:32	BB-IX-2	White Sands	36.223	LIDOS - Ultraviolet astronomy	Success		
18 January 2008; 07:50	BB-XII	Andøya	40.021	SCIFER-2 - Auroral studies	Success		
27 January 2020; 13:40	BB-IX	White Sands		PolarNOx 2 - Thermosphere research	Success	260 kilometres (160 mi)	
08 September 2020; 18:00	BB-IX	White Sands		DUST-2 - Study of small particles	Success	346 kilometres (215 mi)	
02 November 2020; 10:20	BB-IX	White Sands		DEUCE - Astronomy	Success	285 kilometres (177 mi)	

== See also ==
- Black Brant (rocket)
