= Upper Atmosphere Research Panel =

The Upper Atmosphere Research Panel, also known as the V-2 Panel, was formed in 1946 to oversee experiments conducted using V-2 rockets brought to the United States after World War II. The experiments studied the upper atmosphere, solar radiation and X-ray astronomy, as well as the technology of the V-2 rocket.

== Members ==
An organizing meeting was held at Princeton University 27 Feb 1946.

The original committee members were:

- Ernst Henry Krause, Naval Research Laboratory
- G. K. Megerian (secretary), General Electric Co.
- W. G. Dow, University of Michigan
- M. J. E. Golay, U.S. Army Signal Corps
- C. F. Green, General Electric Co.
- K. H. Kingdon, General Electric Co.
- M. H. Nichols, Princeton University
- James Van Allen, Johns Hopkins University
- Fred Lawrence Whipple, Harvard University

== See also ==
- Operation Paperclip
- Hermes project
- List of V-2 test launches
- USA V-2 period
