= Albert II (monkey) =

First primate and first mammal in space

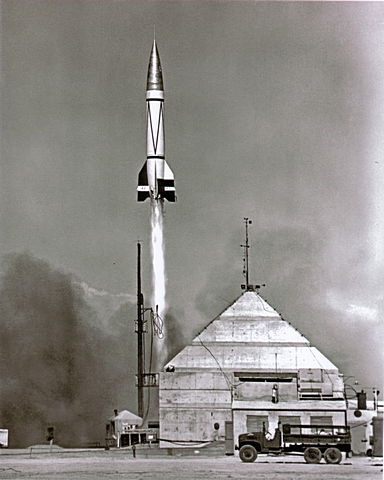
On June 14, 1949, V-2 launch No. 47 at Holloman Air Force Base in New Mexico carried Albert II to become the first primate and first mammal in space.

Albert II was a male rhesus macaque monkey who was the first mammal and first primate to travel to outer space. He flew from Holloman Air Force Base in New Mexico, United States, to an altitude of 83 miles (134 km) aboard Blossom No. 4B, a U.S. V-2 sounding rocket on June 14, 1949. Albert died upon landing after a parachute failure caused his capsule to strike the ground at high speed. Albert's respiratory and cardiological data were recorded up to the moment of impact.

== Background ==
Animals were launched into space in order to test the survivability of spaceflight, before human spaceflights were attempted. Before Albert II, the only previous known living beings in space were fruit flies, launched by the United States in Blossom 1, a V-2 rocket suborbital flight on February 20, 1947. The flies were recovered alive.

Albert I was a nine-pound monkey who was anesthetized and placed inside a capsule in the nose of Blossom No. 3, a V-2 rocket flight on June 11, 1948. The rocket reached 39 mi (63 km) on a high mesospheric flight and did not reach outer space. Following the likely preflight death of Albert I, the capsule was redesigned to enlarge the cramped quarters.

== Albert II's spaceflight ==
Albert II's flight was run by the Alamogordo Guided Missile Test Base and organized with the help of Holloman Air Force Base. Albert was launched into space on June 14, 1949, aboard a V-2 rocket from White Sands, New Mexico. He was connected to equipment that successfully monitored his heartrate and other vitals. The flight reached an altitude of approximately 83 miles (134 kilometers), past the Kármán line, 100 km of altitude generally accepted as the boundary of space. Three minutes after the launch, the space capsule disconnected from the booster, preparing for Albert's descent. Upon re-entry, the ship's parachute failed and Albert II was killed on impact. His crash-landing, occurring approximately six minutes after launch, left a 10-foot crater in the ground.

The flight provided useful data for scientists to prepare for human spaceflight, as although the ship's parachute had failed, the vitals data had been successfully transmitted back to ground control on Earth. David Simons, the United States Air Force project officer for V-2 animal studies stated that Albert’s heart rate was “clearly disturbed” by g-forces.

== Aftermath ==
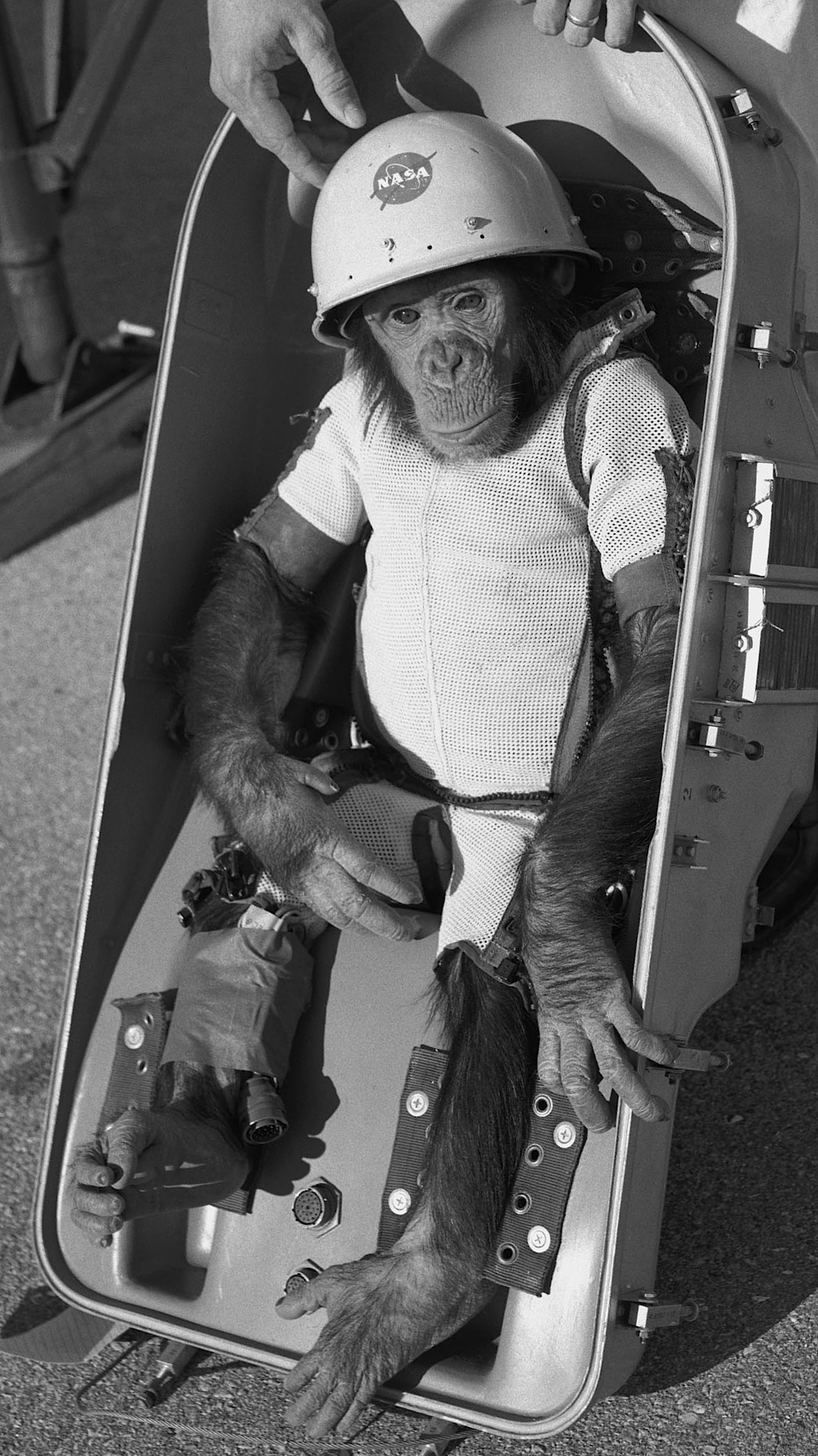
Ham, the first great ape in space, who flew in 1961 (over 12 years after Albert II)

After Albert II, several other monkeys named Albert followed. Albert III was killed before he reached space when the V-2 rocket exploded during the ascent. Albert IV met a similar fate as Albert II - he reached space (though several miles lower than II), and died on impact with the ground due to a parachute release malfunction. Following this, NASA switched to using Aerobee rockets, and on April 18, 1951, a monkey, possibly called Albert V, died once again due to parachute failure during descent. Two months after Soviet space dogs Dezik and Tsygan survived a July 1951 spaceflight, Yorick, also called Albert VI, attained a non-space height of 72 km (44.7 mi) but did become the first primate to survive a landing. He died two hours later, still in the rocket, before being retrieved.

On January 31, 1961, over 12 years after Albert II's flight, Ham, a chimpanzee, became the first great ape in space. He flew a suborbital flight on the Mercury-Redstone 2 mission, part of the U.S. space program's Project Mercury. Unlike his macaque predecessors, Ham lived for 19 more years after his flight.

== See also ==
- Animals in space
- Monkeys and apes in space
- Alice King Chatham, who designed Albert II's oxygen mask and harness
- Laika, a Russian space dog, the first animal to orbit the Earth (November 3, 1957)
- Ham, a chimpanzee, the first great ape in space (January 31, 1961)
- Yuri Gagarin, the first human in space and first primate to orbit the Earth (April 12, 1961)
- Enos, the first chimpanzee and third primate to orbit the Earth (November 29, 1961)
- List of individual monkeys
