= Hermes program =

United States Army missile research program

Hermes A-1, A-3B
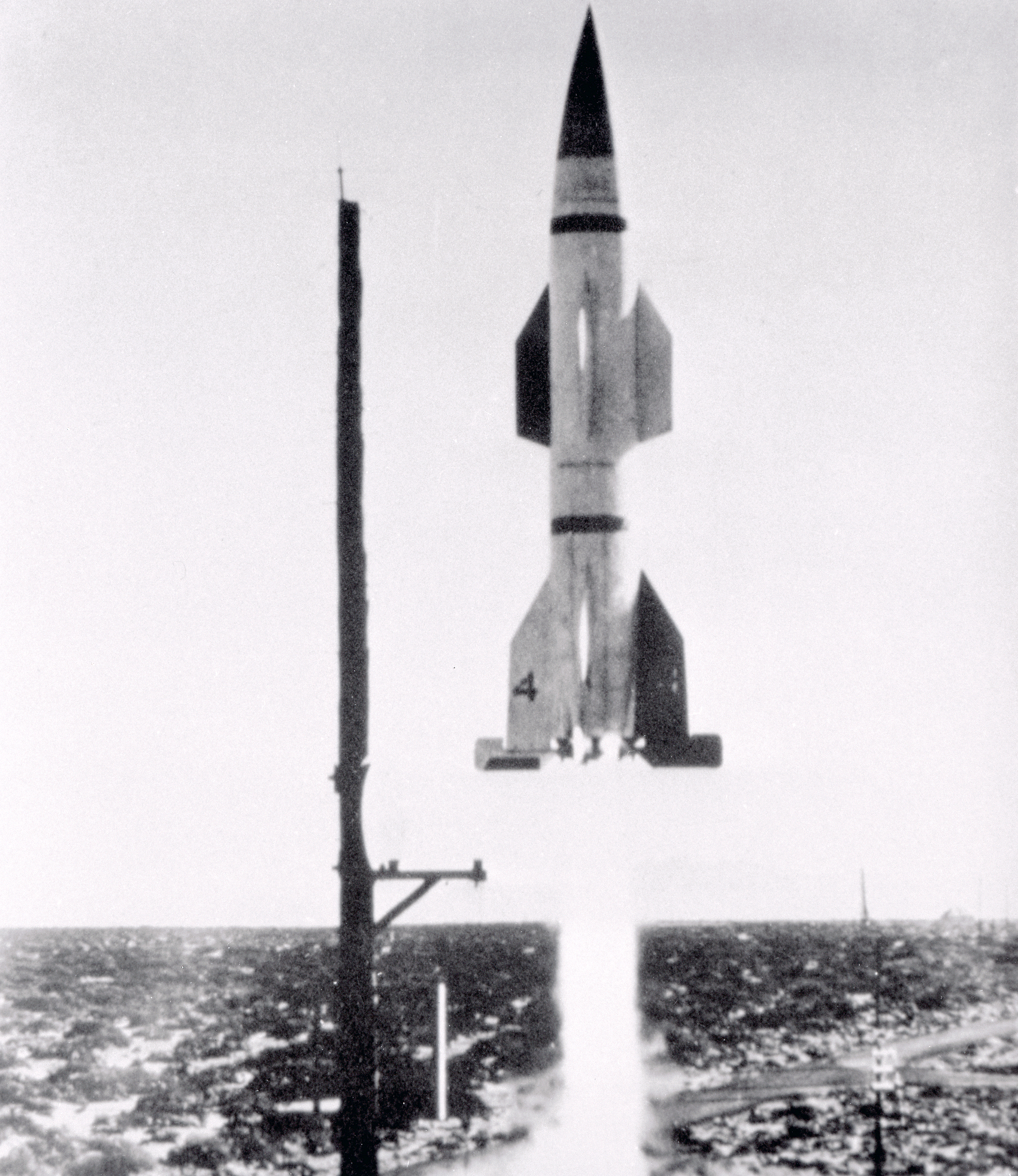
- The first Hermes A-1 test rocket, fired at White Sands Proving Ground
- Function: A-1: Experimental
- Manufacturer: A-1 (1946): General Electric
- Country of origin: United States

Size
- Height: A-1: 300 in (7.6 m); A-3B: 396 in (10.1 m)
- Diameter: A-1: 34 5/8 in (88 cm); A-3B: 47 in (120 cm)
- Mass: A-1: 3,000 lb (1,400 kg); A-3B: 5,139 lb (2,331 kg)

Launch history
- Status: Retired
- Launch sites: White Sands Proving Ground
- Total launches: 58
- Failure: A-3B: 1 (1953–1954)

Boosters
- Thrust: A-3B: 22,600 pounds-force (101,000 N)

Project Hermes was a missile research program run by the Ordnance Corps of the United States Army from November 15, 1944, to December 31, 1954, in response to Germany's rocket attacks in Europe during World War II. The program was to determine the missile needs of army field forces. A research and development partnership between the Ordnance Corps and General Electric started November 20, 1944 and resulted in the "development of long-range missiles that could be used against both ground targets and high-altitude aircraft."

== History ==
Hermes was the second missile program by the United States Army. In May 1944 the Army contracted with the California Institute of Technology's Guggenheim Aeronautical Laboratories to start the ORDCIT project to research, test and develop guided missiles. The Hermes program was to originally have three phases: the first would be a literature search, the second a research group would be dispatched to Europe to investigate the German Missiles, and the third "would design and develop its own experimental systems."

Basically, this project covered every phase of missile technology with the exception of large-scale development and production of warheads and fuzes. However, ... these many areas may be grouped within three general categories, namely, the A1 and A2 missiles, the A3 missiles, and all other Hermes missiles and supporting research.

— John W. Bullard

On November 20, 1944, the Ordnance Corps signed a contract with General Electric. "The contractor agreed to perform investigations, research, experiments, design, development, and engineering work in connection with the development of long-range missiles for use against ground targets and high-altitude aircraft." General Electric was also to investigate ramjets, solid rocket motors, liquid propellant rocket engines, and hybrid propellants. "The contract also required the General Electric Company to develop remote control equipment, ground equipment, fire control devices, and homing devices."

In December 1944, the Hermes program was tasked with studying the German V-2 rocket. Subjects which were to be addressed were "transporting, handling, unpacking, classifying (identifying), reconditioning and testing components of German rockets as well as assembling and testing subassemblies and complete rockets, manufacturing new parts, modification of existing parts, conducting special tests, constructing temporary test equipment not available at the Proving Ground procuring and handling of propellants and supervision of launching rockets."

The project's mandate created a need for an extensive area where missiles could be safely tested. The Army moved to create the White Sands Proving Grounds in south central New Mexico as a place to test the new missiles.

When the United States Army captured the Peenemünde engineers, including Wernher von Braun, Dr. Richard W. Porter of Project Hermes was close behind. Following the capture by American forces of the Mittelwerk V-2 factory, Special Mission V-2 swept in and scooped up enough components to assemble 100 V-2s. The components were quickly removed to New Mexico. Three hundred rail cars of V-2 parts and documentation arrived at the White Sands Proving Grounds and General Electric personnel started the task of inventorying the components. For the next five years overhauling and manufacture of parts, assembly, modification and launching V-2 rockets would be the major part of Project Hermes. Many of the V-2 components were in poor condition or unusable.

After the German V-2 parts and technology were imported into the United States, the U. S. Army formed the Upper Atmosphere Research Panel in early 1946 to oversee experiments both about their technology and their use for upper atmosphere research. One-third of the panel members were General Electric scientists. The Hermes project was expanded to include testing of the V-2 sounding rockets. General Electric employees, with the help of German specialists, assembled V-2s at White Sands Proving Grounds in New Mexico where the Army constructed a blockhouse and Launch Complex 33, now a National Historical Landmark. The first V-2 launch there was on April 16, 1946, but reached only 3.4 miles' altitude. The maximum altitude reached by a Project Hermes V-2 was 114 miles achieved by V-2 #17 on 17 December 1946. There were 58 standard V-2s, 6 Bumper" V-2s with a WAC Corporal second stage, and 4 drastically modified V-2s launched as Hermes IIs (Hermes B) by Project Hermes. The last Hermes flight was by V-2 #60 on 29 October 1951, carrying a Signal Corps Electronic Laboratory payload. Most photos of American V-2s show the common white and black markings. The first two flown were painted in yellow and black. Others had combinations of white, black, silver and red. The last two fired by Project Hermes were black, white, and red with a big "Buy Bonds" logo (V-2 #52) and white, black, and silver with a small "Buy Bonds" logo.

The Project Hermes V-2 program had achieved its objectives. First, it had gained experience in handling and firing large missiles and trained Army personnel to launch them (the last 4 American V-2 flights were not part of Project Hermes, they were Army launched "Training Flights"). Second, Hermes had provided vehicles for experiments which aided the design of future missiles. Third, Hermes had tested components for future missiles. Fourth, Hermes had obtained ballistic data on high-altitude trajectories as well as developing various means of tracking such trajectories. Fifth, the V-2 program had provided vehicles for upper atmosphere and biological research. Additionally many components had to be manufactured due to shortages and deteriorated condition. Most notable was the inertial guidance system and mix computer. After the termination of V-2 flights by Hermes there were 5 final flights by V-2s from White Sands. They were training flights launched by Detachment 2 of the 1st Guided Missile Support Battalion. Between 22 August 1951 and 19 September 1952 the 74th and final flight of a V-2 from White Sands was launched.

== Hermes II ==
The initial goals of Project Hermes included Hermes B, a ramjet-powered cruise missile. Hermes B was soon split into a Hermes B-1 test vehicle and a Hermes B-2 operational missile. Hermes B-1 soon evolved into Hermes II. In June 1946 General Electric's contract was amended to include a two-stage missile which used a V-2 as its first stage, with a ramjet-powered supersonic cruise missile as the second stage. The ramjet was assigned to the Von Braun team of which less than 40 were employed in the V-2 launching program. Design on the ramjet began on 10 December 1945. The Von Braun team dubbed the ramjet the "Comet." Though the Peenemünde engineers had no experience with ramjets, and some members were scattered across the country, work progressed. On 11 January 1946 Von Braun presented his cruise missile design to Major General Barnes and the program was underway. Hermes II (aka RTV-G-3 & RV-A-3) was an attempt to produce a high-velocity ramjet-powered cruise missile. A V-2 would boost the cruise missile called the "Comet," or "Ram." to mach 3.3 at 66,000 feet (20,000 m) where the ramjets would start. The Hermes II was an unusual design. It had two rectangular "wings" which doubled as the ramjets. It was described as a "two-dimensional, split-wing ramjet. The Hermes II, with its large rectangular wings, required enlarged tail fins. Still aerodynamic data was scant, and indicated that the Hermes II was unstable at most velocities which required more development of the guidance system. Another concern was the fuel intended, carbon disulfide, which was easy to ignite, but had a low specific impulse. At peak employment the Hermes II program employed 125 Germans, 30 Army officers, 400 enlisted personnel, 75–100 civil service personnel and 175 G.E. employees.

A V-2 was modified to carry a test device called the "Organ," a series of test diffusers (ramjet air intakes) which was to make measurements of pressures. That first Hermes II test missile (missile 0) was launched on 29 May 1947 and landed in Mexico causing an international incident. WSPG V-2 #44 carried a test ramjet diffuser. The successful flight returned data from Mach 3.6 and made GE confident it could proceed with a two-stage test. Progress was slow which frustrated Von Braun. The next Hermes II, (missile 1), the first to have the wings containing the ramjets, was launched by GE on 13 January 1949 and broke up shortly after liftoff due to unanticipated vibrations. There were two further Hermes flights missile #2 on 6 October 1949, which suffered the fate of missile 1. Missile 2-A on November 9, 1950. Missile 2-A did not break up, but the ramjet never started. When the Von Braun team transferred to Redstone Arsenal in Huntsville, Alabama, their primary mission was still a Mach 3.3 ramjet cruise missile. In May 1950 Hermes II was reduced to research only status. At that time Ordnance transferred the Mach 4 Hermes B from the General Electric grounds to Huntsville. September 1950 saw General Electric's Hermes C-1 study transferred to Huntsville where it evolved into the very successful PGM-11 Redstone short-range ballistic missile. The Hermes ramjet cruise missile faded into obscure history as it was terminated in 1953.

== Hermes B ==
Hermes B was a Mach 4 ramjet-powered cruise missile design study undertaken by General Electric. It was later transferred to the Von Braun team at the Redstone Arsenal. Hermes B was also designated SSM-G-9 and SSM-A-9.

== The Surface to Air and Surface to Surface Missiles ==
The development of the 25-foot (7.6 m) Hermes A-1 (CTV-G-5/RV-A-5) rocket was begun by General Electric in 1946. Constructed mostly of steel, it was an American version of the German Wasserfall anti-aircraft missile; the latter was about half the size of the German V-2 rocket. The Wasserfall's aerodynamic shape was later adopted for the North American NATIV. Hermes A-1 had one major difference from the Wasserfall. The Peenemünde nitric acid/visol (vinyl isobutyl ether)-fueled P IX engine was replaced by a General Electric pressure fed 13,500 pounds-force (60,000 newtons) thrust liquid oxygen/alcohol-fueled engine. Beginning in 1947, the engine of the A-1 was tested at General Electric's Malta Test Station in New York. The General Electric engine had a novel fuel injector which had great influence on future engine development in the United States. Combustion instability problems delayed engine development.

Hermes A-1 components such as guidance and telemetry were tested on several V-2 flights at White Sands Proving Grounds in 1947 and 1948. Plans to develop Hermes A-1 as an operational surface to air missile were dropped in favor of the more suitable Nike. On 18 May 1950 the Army switched emphasis for Project Hermes to the surface to surface mission. The next day the Hermes A-1 first flew. The launch failed when thrust was lost shortly after lift-off. The second flight failed after 41 seconds when the hydraulic servo covers were burned through by engine exhaust. None of the three subsequent Hermes A-1 flights were totally successful, though "they demonstrated the functional capability of the missile system." Those last three launches achieved apogees of 14 miles (23 km).

The demise of the Hermes A-1 did not end two other design studies. Work on the Hermes A-1E-1 and Hermes A-1E-2 continued. They were tactical missile designs 25 and 29 feet (7.6 and 8.8 m) long, respectively. Both were to have 1,450-pound (660 kg) warheads. The competing Corporal (XSSM—G-7/XSSN-A-7) showed better development and Hermes A-1E-2 was cancelled in April 1952 and was followed by the A-1E-1 in October of that year.

The original Hermes A-2 was projected to be a wingless A-1, but that missile was abandoned to be followed by another rocket called A-2 (RV-A-10). The RV-A10 was a short range solid fuel test vehicle, with plans to develop a tactical missile (SSM-A-13), which were soon abandoned.

The slightly larger Hermes A-3A (SSM-G-8, RV-A-8) followed. Progress on the Hermes A-3 until it was divided into an A-3A (RV-A-8) test vehicle and the A-3B (SSM-A-16) which was intended to be an operational missile with a W-5 nuclear warhead. A total of seven RV-A-8 were launches and five of them were either partial or total failures.

The A-3B (SS-A-16) was slightly larger than the RV-A-8 and the last produced and tested vehicle of the Hermes missile program. It was designed as a tactical surface-to-surface missile carrying a 1,000-pound (450 kg) warhead with a 150-mile (240 km) range but never achieved that range in practice. It had a thrust of 22,600 pounds-force (101,000 N). By 1954 six A-3Bs were test launched at White Sands, with five of the launches performed successfully. One of the developments of the Hermes A-3 program was the first inertial guidance system tested on a ballistic missile. None of the Hermes missiles became operational, but did provide experience in the design, construction, and handling of large-scale missiles and rocket engines. The Hermes program was canceled in 1954.

There were Hermes missiles which never flew. Work on a ramjet cruise missile continued after the end of the RTV-3 program. It was an ambitious program intended to produce a cruise missile, the Hermes II the RV-A-6 (Hermes B-1?), cable of flying mach 4.5 at 2,500 miles per hour (4,000 km/h) at 80,000 feet (24,000 m). There was a SS-G-9, Hermes B-2 which was never built.

The Hermes C program was composed of a series of studies, one of which was the Hermes C-1, which led directly to the SM-A-14 (GM-11) Redstone.

== See also ==
- List of Hermes missions
- Hermes Guided Missile Historical marker https://www.hmdb.org/m.asp?m=34957
