= Prédefin V-2 radioguidance base =

Pédrefin V-2 radioguidance base
- Part of Nazi Germany's V-2 rocket programme
- Near Prédefin, Pas-de-Calais, France

Site information
- Type: V-2 radioguidance and radar installation; later Luftwaffe radiolocation site
- Controlled by: Initially Wehrmacht; later Luftwaffe
- Open to the public: No
- Condition: Ruins

Location
- Coordinates: 50°29′41.93″N 2°15′36.53″E

Site history
- Built: 1943–1944
- Built for: V-2 radioguidance base
- Built by: Organisation Todt
- Materials: Reinforced concrete
- Battles/wars: Operation Crossbow
- Events: Bombed in 1944

The Prédefin V-2 radioguidance base was a planned radioguidance base for V-2 rockets built by Nazi Germany near the village of Prédefin, approximately 16 kilometers northwest of Saint-Pol-sur-Ternoise in the Pas-de-Calais département of northern France. Constructed by the Organisation Todt, the site was intended to provide radio-based guidance and tracking capabilities for the nearby planned firing complexes at Watten and Helfaut-Wizernes, using the Leitstrahl ("guidance beam") concept, in coordination with the guidance bunker at Roquetoire. As the V-2 program evolved, fixed radio-guidance installations became operationally obsolete by early 1944 as the V-2 were equipped with an inertial platform and mobile firing stations developed. By early 1944, the Prédefin installation was transferred from the Wehrmacht to the Luftwaffe and repurposed as a radiolocation station within the regional air-defense network of northern France and as a support for the launch of V-1 flying bombs.

== Background ==
Main V2-weapons heavy sites built in northern France by the Organization Todt from 1943 to 1944.

Initial guidance experiments of the V-2 rocket at Peenemünde combined inertial stabilization with the possibility of radio assistance during powered flight. The V-2's flight-control architecture included gyroscopic stabilisation and a guidance computer. The Mischgerät (German for 'mixer device') combined guidance inputs to drive the steering system. Gyroscopic systems could not account for crosswinds and so a radio remote control was planned to address this limitation.

German engineers Helmut Hölzer, Otto Hirschler and Otto Hoberg explored radio-beam guidance concepts such as a Funkkanone (German for 'radio gun'), in which a narrow Leitstrahl (German for 'guidance beam') could be formed using a defocused antenna of a Würzburg radar and an onboard computing device Mischgerät would command corrections to steer back toward the beam axis, principally to maintain azimuth, during ascent and powered flight. Preliminary tests were successfully carried out with a Wurzburg-Riese radar in Peenemünde. With the help of the "radio gun", the V-2 could theoretically follow the radio guidance beam until it reaches Brennschluss (German for 'firing end') at a distance of 30–40 km from the launch pad. At the end of the propulsion thrust, the rocket continued to fly as a pure projectile.

Northern France was selected for the deployment of heavy V2-weapon infrastructure due to its proximity to the United Kingdom, dense railway network, and existing military installations. The guidance beam required carefully surveyed geometry and dedicated ground equipment, which constrained deployment and made fixed stations attractive for large, protected firing complexes like Watten and Helfaut-Wizernes bunkers. However, there was concern that the Allies could potentially jam the guidance system and divert the rockets off course. To counter this risk, the Organisation Todt was instructed to construct in the Pas-de-Calais a radio guidance base that could be used to send course corrections to the V-2 rockets and a bunker to protect the mobile guidance systems.

The Prédefin radioguidance site formed part of a broader system of V-weapon-related facilities in the Pas-de-Calais, including guidance, launch, storage, and radar elements. The installation Umspannwerk C (German for 'Transformer station C') located in Roquetoire (50°40′13.31″N 2°20′20.4″E) has been described by military historians as the only V-2 installation specifically designed to deploy the Leitstrahl beam concept, providing protected support for Leitstrahl mobile equipment and crews.

Allied wartime and post-war technical reports on radio countermeasures confirmed the general vulnerability of radio-dependent systems to jamming and deception, reinforcing German interest in guidance solutions that could function autonomously without external signals. By 1944, improvements in inertial methods and the operational shift toward mobile V-2 firing and radioguidance stations reduced the military utility of fixed beam-guidance sites.

== Design and construction ==
Radio-guidance concepts imposed strict geometric constraints on site placement and were vulnerable to Allied electronic countermeasures. The location for the base near the village of Prédefin, 16 kilometers northwest of Saint-Pol-sur-Ternoise in Pas-de-Calais, was chosen in 1942. The KNW firing bunker at Eperlecques and the SNW firing bunker at Helfaut-Wizernes, located respectively 38 and 24 kilometers away, was to be aligned with the proposed site of the radio guidance base to allow the radar to pick up the radar signal of a fast moving object like the V-2 rocket.

The complex consisted of two distinct but aligned sectors: a radar installation and a larger radioguidance centre. Construction began in early 1943 under the supervision of the Organisation Todt. Contemporary accounts describe the use of approximately 50,000 bags of cement (around 2,500 tonnes), transported via a narrow-gauge auxiliary railway spur connected to the Saint-Pol-sur-Ternoise – Hesdin railway. More than 1,200 workers were employed on the site, including Belgian and Polish forced labourers, French civilian workers, and personnel requisitioned under the Service du travail obligatoire (STO). Workers were housed in barracks established in the village, while Organisation Todt engineers and administrators were accommodated separately near the construction area.

=== Radar installation ===
The main radar installation was a reinforced-concrete bunker supporting a Wurzburg-Riese radar for the initial coverage of the flight and a FuMg 41 Mammut "Friedrich" radar for the later part of the flight.

The bunker measured approximately 23 meters in length, 12.5 meters in width, and 5.4 meters in height. Its roof slab, about 2 meters thick, supported concrete anchor blocks for 30-meter-high metal pylons supporting the large rectangular frame of the Mammut radar with a reported span of roughly 29 meters. It consisted of a command post, radar control rooms, an operations room equipped with two Seeburg plotting tables, and a machine room housing 500 kVA electrical generators, boilers, and ventilation systems venting through the roof slab. Transformer equipment and cabling were linked via open concrete trenches, and an external water tank supplied cooling for the generators

=== Radiolocation and support base ===
Located 500 m from the radar installation, the larger radiolocation and accommodation complex was constructed at a location referred to as Bois Lewingle, alongside the railway line. The entrance was protected by barriers and a concrete guard post, with a multi-storey security building incorporating an armoury.

=== Decoy installation ===
To reduce the effectiveness of Allied bombing, a dummy radar site was reportedly constructed approximately 2 kilometers east of Prédefin, in Fontaine-lès-Boulans, intended to divert attacks from the main installation by simulating radar activity.

== Operational role and reassignment ==
Although originally conceived to support V-2 radioguidance in conjunction with the Roquetoire installation, the Pédrefin site never became operational in this role but the Leitstrahl system would later be adapted for mobile firing operations. Responsibility for the installation was therefore transferred from the Wehrmacht to the Luftwaffe, and the site was incorporated into the regional air-defence radiolocation network covering the Nord–Pas-de-Calais area.

The V-2 radioguidance installation was transformed into an aerial radiolocation center by the Luftwaffe. The radiolocation base included emplacements for two Würzburg radars and one Freya radar, together with radio transmission masts, listening and transmission centres, and supporting technical plant including boiler and power-generation facilities.

Associated infrastructure comprised shelters, an observation post, multiple accommodation buildings, medical facilities, and training installations. One principal building is described as approximately 100 meters long and 20 meters wide, organised around a central corridor and containing kitchens, administrative rooms, and large communal spaces including a cinema or assembly hall.

Personnel assigned to the site included radar specialists, communications technicians, telephonists, and Luftwaffe signal personnel. Estimates suggest that more than 600 personnel may have been stationed at the complex at peak occupancy and that the station housed part of the headquarters responsible for the deployment of V-1 flying bombs. The site was evacuated by the German army in September 1944, facing the rapid advance of the Allied forces from the Seine, simultaneously with the V-2 heavy rocket facilities in northern France.

== Air raids on the Prédefin site ==
The Pédrefin complex was repeatedly targeted during the Allied campaign against V-weapon and radar installations under Operation Crossbow. It was subjected to a total of about fifteen air bombings aimed at their destruction.

The first bombings occurred on 6 and 9 January 1944, and the last documented raid took place on 6 July 1944. USAAF mission reports also record attacks on military installations at Fiefs and Prédefin on 19–20 June 1944.

== Current condition ==
Remains of the installation survive in a fragmented and overgrown state. Due to the dispersal of structures and post-war agricultural use, many elements are difficult to identify on the ground. The site lies on private land, and access requires permission from landowners.

== See also ==
- V-2 rocket facilities of World War II

== Bibliography ==
- Henshall, Philip (2002). "Prédefin and Rocquetoire". Hitler's V-weapon sites. Stroud: Sutton Publishing. ISBN 978-0-7509-2607-2.
- Dungan, Tracy Dwayne (2019). V-2: A Combat History of the First Ballistic Missile. Havertown, PA: Westholme Publishing. ISBN 978-1-59416-327-2.
- Brandt, Leo (1962). "Rückblick auf die deutsche Funkmeßtechnik". In Brandt, Leo (ed.). Forschen und Gestalten: Reden und Aufsätze (in German). Wiesbaden: VS Verlag für Sozialwissenschaften. pp. 53–79. doi:10.1007/978-3-663-02447-7_5. ISBN 978-3-663-02447-7.
- Hautefeuille, Roland (1995). Constructions spéciales: histoire de la construction par l'Organisation Todt dans le Pas-de-Calais et le Cotentin des neuf grands sites protégés pour le tir des V1, V2, V3 et la production d'oxygène liquide (1943–1944) (in French) (2 ed.). France. ISBN 978-2-9500899-0-8.
- Müller, Werner (1998). Ground radar systems of the German Luftwaffe to 1945. Atglen, PA: Schiffer Publishing. ISBN 978-0-7643-0567-2.
- Herz, Karl; Brandt, Leo (1952). Die technischen Entwicklungstendenzen im elektrischen Nachrichtenwesen. Arbeitsgemeinschaft für Forschung des Landes Nordrhein-Westfalen (in German). Vol. 13. Wiesbaden: Springer Fachmedien Wiesbaden (VS Verlag). doi:10.1007/978-3-663-02952-6. ISBN 978-3-663-01039-5.
- Hoelzer, Helmut (1990). "50 Jahre Analog Computer" (PDF). Foundation for German Communication and Related Technologies (in German).
- National Defense Research Committee (1946). Radio countermeasures. Summary technical report of the National Defense Research Committee. Vol. 1. Washington, D.C.: Office of Scientific Research and Development.
- Ramsey, Winston; Pallud, Jean Paul (2021). "Fruges/Prédefin (Target XII/20)". German Coastal Radar Stations: Then and Now. London: After the Battle. ISBN 978-1-399-07633-3.
- Neufeld, Michael J. (1995). The Rocket and the Reich: Peenemünde and the Coming of the Ballistic Missile Era. New York: Free Press. ISBN 978-0-02-922895-1.
- Tomayko, James E. (1985). "Hoelzer's Analog Computer". IEEE Annals of the History of Computing. 7 (3): 227–240. doi:10.1109/MAHC.1985.10025.
- V2ROCKET. "Leitstrahlstellung Bunker Roquetoire". V2ROCKET.COM.
- NormandyBunkers. "Predefin radio and radar site – STP224 Strandhafer". NormandyBunkers.
- Association Fort de Litroz. "La base de radioguidage V2 de Prédefin". fortlitroz.ch (in French).
- 303rd Bombardment Group. "364 Combat Missions of the 303rd Bombardment Group (H)". 303rdbg.com. 19 June 1944 – Target: Military Installations at Fiefs & Prédefin, France: Mission 184, Mission 185
- 391st Bomb Group. "391st Bomb Group – All Missions". www.391bombgroup.org.uk. Archived from the original on 2024-10-03.
- Smithsonian 1. "Receiver, V-2 Rocket Guide Plane". National Air and Space Museum.
- Smithsonian 2. "Guidance Platform, V-2, SG-66". National Air and Space Museum.
- Ulmann, Bernd (2008). "Von der Raketensteuerung zum Analogrechner: Helmut Hölzers Peenemünder Arbeiten und ihr Erbe" [From rocket control to analog computers: Helmut Hölzer's Peenemünde works and their legacy] (PDF) (in German). Kolloquium zur Geschichte der Naturwissenschaften, Mathematik und Technik, Universität Hamburg.
- Zaloga, Steven (2003). V-2 Ballistic Missile 1942–52 (PDF). New Vanguard 82. Osprey publishing. ISBN 978-1-84176-541-9.
- Lesage, René (1998). La résistance en Artois occidental (juin 1940-mai 1944) (in French). Revue du Nord.
- Cuich, Myrone N. (1979). Mission sans retour (in French). ISBN 979-1-04-105014-7.
