= 1942 in aviation =

This is a list of aviation-related events from 1942:

== Events ==
- The United States Coast Guard begins to use the national insignia for United States Army, United States Navy, and United States Marine Corps aircraft on its own aircraft for the first time. The practice has continued ever since.

=== January ===
- The U.S. Joint Chiefs of Staff begin to consider how to create a transportation system in the China-Burma-India Theater, primarily involving transport aircraft.
- Lieutenant Ivan Chisov of the Soviet Air Force miraculously survives a fall from 22,000 feet (6,700 meters) without a parachute after departing a heavily damaged Ilyushin Il-4 twin-engined medium bomber. After achieving a terminal velocity of about 150 mph (240 km/h), he is decelerated when he hits the lip of a snow-covered ravine, sliding down with decreasing speed until he stops at the bottom, suffering a broken pelvis and severe spinal injuries.
- The Soviet Union parachutes 2,000 troops behind German lines at Medyn, near Tula, in support of Soviet Army offensive operations.
- January 4–7 – Soviet Air Force aircraft attack forward Luftwaffe airfields at Rzhev and Velikiye Luki while German transport aircraft are using them to resupply German ground units. The Soviets claim nine Junkers Ju 52s destroyed on the ground and one Dornier Do 217 shot down in aerial combat.
- January 6
  - Imperial Japanese Navy aircraft based at Truk begin attacks on the Australian air base at Rabaul.
  - The first phase of the 1941–42 winter Soviet counter-offensive comes to an end after 33 days. Since it began on December 5, 1941, the Soviet Air Force has flown 16,000 sorties in support of it, about half of them in direct support of Soviet Army ground forces and about 70 percent of them in the offensive's northern sector.
- January 11 – Japanese aircraft drop 324 naval paratroopers as part of a successful assault against Dutch forces defending the Menado Peninsula on Celebes.
- January 12 – The Soviet aeronautical engineer and aircraft designer Vladimir Petlyakov dies in the crash of a Petlyakov Pe-2 near Arzamas in the Soviet Union.
- January 13 – Heinkel test pilot Helmut Schenk becomes the first person to escape from a stricken aircraft with an ejection seat after the control surfaces of the first prototype He 280 V1 ice up and become inoperable. The fighter, being used in tests of the Argus As 014 pulsejets for Fieseler Fi 103 cruise missile development, had had its regular HeS 8A turbojets removed, and had been towed aloft from the Erprobungstelle Rechlin central test facility in Germany by a pair of Messerschmitt Bf 110C tugs in a heavy snow-shower. At 2,395 meters (7,858 feet), Schenk finds he has no control, jettisons his towline, and ejects.
- January 16 – Transcontinental & Western Air Flight 3 crashes into Potosi Mountain in Nevada, killing all 22 aboard including movie star Carole Lombard.
- January 24 – The Japanese aircraft carriers Hiryū and Sōryū begin strikes on Ambon.
- January 28
  - The United States Army Air Forces activate the Eighth Air Force to serve in England as a strategic air force in Europe.
  - Piloting a Lockheed PBO-1 Hudson patrol bomber over the North Atlantic, U.S. Navy Chief Aviation Machinist's Mate Donald Francis Mason attacks a German submarine, which submerges and escapes. Thinking he had sunk it, he signals "SIGHTED SUB, SANK SAME." It becomes one of the most famous signals of World War II.
- January 30
  - Six Imperial Japanese Navy Mitsubishi A6M Zero (Allied reporting name "Zeke") fighters shoot down the Qantas Short Empire flying boat G-AEUH off West Timor in the Netherlands East Indies, killing 13 of the 18 people on board.
  - Canadian Pacific Air Lines is formed by the acquisition and merger of Arrow Airways and Canadian Airways, along with all the various subsidiaries of the latter.
- January 31 – During the winter of 1941–1942, Royal Air Force Bomber Command experiences a 2.5 percent loss rate among its aircraft attacking Germany.

=== February ===
- The United States Army Air Forces redesignate various organizations as the Fifth (in the Far East), Sixth (in the Panama Canal Zone), Seventh (in the Territory of Hawaii), and Eleventh (in the Territory of Alaska) Air Forces.
- The Commanding General of the U.S. Army Air Forces, Henry H. Arnold, tells President Franklin D. Roosevelt that an air cargo route between India and China should be established to make up for the likely imminent loss of Rangoon, Burma, to Japanese forces. Roosevelt orders Arnold to commandeer 25 civilian Douglas DC-3s to begin the airlift.
- Royal Air Force Bomber Command begins using "Shaker" – long-burning flares – to illuminate targets for its aircraft.
- The Luftwaffe's Fliegerkorps II greatly intensifies its bombing campaign against Malta.
- February 1 – The U.S. Navy aircraft carriers USS Enterprise (CV-6) and USS Yorktown (CV-5) launch air strikes against Japanese bases in the Marshall Islands. It is the first offensive operation by American forces in World War II.
- February 8 – Dr. Fritz Todt, the German Reich Minister for Armaments and Ammunition, dies in the crash of a Junkers Ju 52 shortly after takeoff from Rastenburg, East Prussia.
- February 11–13 – 250 Messerschmitt Bf 109 and Focke-Wulf Fw 190 fighters and 30 Messerschmitt Bf 110 night fighters participate in Operation Thunderbolt, the German Luftwaffe's defense of the battlecruisers Scharnhorst and Gneisenau and heavy cruiser Prinz Eugen as they make the "Channel Dash" (Operation Cerberus) from Brest, France, to Wilhelmshaven and Brunsbüttel, Germany, via the English Channel and Strait of Dover. On February 12, six Fleet Air Arm Fairey Swordfish – all of which are shot down; their commander, Lieutenant Commander Eugene Esmonde receives a posthumous Victoria Cross for the attack – and some Royal Air Force Coastal Command Bristol Beauforts attempt torpedo attacks, but score no hits.
- February 12
  - The U.S. Army Air Forces activate the Tenth Air Force for service in China, Burma, and India.
  - German dive bombers sink the British destroyer HMS Maori at Malta.
- February 13 – One hundred Japanese aircraft drop 700 Japanese paratroopers onto Palembang on Sumatra.
- February 19 – Imperial Japanese Navy aircraft conduct a devastating raid on Darwin, Australia, where 45 ships are in the harbor. Known as the "Great Darwin Raid", it is both the first and the largest air attack in history against Australian territory. A first wave of 188 Mitsubishi A6M (Allied reporting name "Zero") fighters, Aichi D3A1 (Allied reporting name "Val") dive bombers, and Nakajima B5N2 (Allied reporting name "Kate") torpedo bombers from the aircraft carriers Akagi, Kaga, Hiryū, and Sōryū is followed by a second wave of 54 land-based Mitsubishi G3M2 (Allied reporting name "Nell") and Mitsubishi G4M1 (Allied reporting name "Betty") bombers. Allied losses in the raid are eight ships sunk (including the U.S. Navy destroyer USS Peary (DD-226)), three ships run aground, 25 ships damaged (including the hospital ship Manunda), 30 aircraft destroyed, 310 people killed, and 400 people wounded; Japanese bombs also destroy the town's hospital and damage its post office, and the explosion of the docked cargo ship Neptuna – loaded with ammunition – virtually destroys the harbor's facilities and sets fire to several large oil-storage tanks. In exchange, the Japanese lose three Vals, one Zero, two men killed, and one man captured. Flying a Curtiss P-40E Warhawk, United States Army Air Forces (USAAF) Lieutenant Robert Oestreicher shoots down two Vals, while Zeroes shoot down four other USAAF P-40Es; the six downed aircraft are the first confirmed aerial victories ever to occur over Australia. Although Japanese carrier aircraft never strike Darwin again, Japanese land-based aircraft will bomb the town 63 more times, the last raid taking place in mid-November 1943.
- February 20 – The first combat between carrier-type aircraft of the Japanese and U.S. navies takes place between Rabaul-based Japanese aircraft and fighters from the aircraft carrier USS Lexington (CV-2) north of the Solomon Islands. The Americans lose two planes and one pilot, but claim to have shot down most of the 18 Japanese attackers; Lieutenant Edward H. "Butch" O'Hare shoots down five bombers to become the second U.S. Navy ace and the first in World War II.
- February 21 – Air Marshal Arthur T. Harris assumes command of RAF Bomber Command. Known to the press as "Bomber" Harris, he will command Bomber Command for the remainder of World War II.
- February 26 – First Intercontinental Division (ICD) flight, with ex-TWA Boeing 307 Stratoliners in USAAF service, but crewed by civilian TWA personnel, beginning the transatlantic passenger and critical cargo aerial ferry service between North American and Europe.
- February 26–27 (overnight) – 49 British bombers attack Kiel, Germany, with the loss of three aircraft. They score two hits on the German battlecruiser Gneisenau, killing 116 of her crew and damaging her so badly that she never is seaworthy again.
- February 27 – The aircraft tender USS Langley (AV-3), which once had been the U.S. Navy's first aircraft carrier as USS Langley (CV-1), is sunk by Japanese aircraft in the Indian Ocean while trying to deliver Curtiss P-40 fighters from Australia to Java.
- February 28 – Since February 1, the Luftwaffe's Fliegerkorps II has flown 2,497 sorties against Malta, including 222 attacks against airfields alone.

=== March ===
- The Soviet Union redesignates the Ilyushin DB-3F as the Ilyushin Il-4.
- March 1 – The U.S. Navy sinks a German submarine for the first time in World War II when a Patrol Squadron 82 (VP-82) Lockheed PBO-1 Hudson piloted by Ensign William Tepuni USNR sinks U-656 off Cape Race, Newfoundland.
- March 3 – Three Imperial Japanese Navy Mitsubishi A6M Zero fighters shoot down the KNILM Douglas DC-3 airliner Pelikaan (tail number PK-AFV) as it approaches Broome, Australia, forcing it to make a belly landing in shallow surf at Carnot Bay, then strafe it, killing or seriously injuring four of the 12 people on board. A Japanese Kawanishi H6K (Allied reporting name "Mavis") flying boat bombs the wreckage the following day. A shipment of diamonds worth A£150,000 to A£300,000 aboard the plane disappears, apparently stolen.
- March 3–4 (overnight) – 235 British bombers – the largest number sent against a single target to date – attack the Renault vehicle factory at Boulogne-Billancourt in Paris in an attempt at night precision bombing. Three-quarters of the bombs hit the factory, but 367 French civilians are killed and 10,000 rendered homeless by errant bombs. The death toll in fact is greater than in any single attack on a German city thus far in the war.
- March 4 – Aircraft from the U.S. Navy aircraft carrier USS Enterprise (CV-6) raid Japanese bases on Marcus Island.
- March 4–5 (overnight) – Two Imperial Japanese Navy Kawanishi H8K (Allied reporting name "Emily") flying boats fly from Wotje, refuel from a submarine at French Frigate Shoals, and fly on to bomb Oahu in the Hawaiian Islands, returning safely. The mission is unsuccessful because of heavy cloud cover in the Honolulu area. It is the first combat flight of the H8K.
- March 5 – The Civil Air Patrol begins maritime patrols off the United States East Coast.
- March 7 – The Royal Air Force commits Supermarine Spitfires to the defense of Malta for the first time, flying 15 of them to the island from the aircraft carriers HMS Argus and HMS Eagle.
- March 8–9 (overnight) through 10-11 (overnight) – Royal Air Force Bomber Command bombs Essen, Germany, on three consecutive nights with 211, 187, and 126 aircraft respectively, losing a combined total of 16 bombers. The raids are the combat debut of the Gee navigation aid, raising British hopes that precision bombing of the Krupp armaments factory will be achieved, but it is not hit, and bombs in fact do far more damage to neighboring towns than to Essen itself. The third raid includes two Avro Lancasters, the first use of the Lancaster against a German target.
- March 9
  - Twelve Fairey Albacore torpedo bombers from the aircraft carrier HMS Victorious attack the German battleship Tirpitz while she is at sea off Norway. They score no hits, and Tirpitz shoots down two Albacores. It is the only time that Allied forces attack Tirpitz while she is in the open sea.
  - The United States Army Air Forces are reorganized, with the separate Air Force Combat Command (the combat element) and United States Army Air Corps (the logistics and training element) discontinued. General Henry H. Arnold, formerly Chief of the Army Air Forces, becomes Commanding General of Army Air Forces. The term "Air Corps" survives until 1947, but only as a reference to the aviation branch of service of the United States Army without indicating any formal organization.
  - The U.S. Navy commissions Air Transport Squadron 1 (VR-1), the first of 13 squadrons it will establish for the Naval Air Transport Service during World War II, at Norfolk, Virginia.
- March 10 – The U.S. Navy aircraft carriers USS Lexington (CV-2) and USS Yorktown (CV-5) launch a 104-aircraft raid from south of New Guinea and over the Owen Stanley Mountains via a 7,500-foot (2,286-meter) pass to strike Japanese shipping off Lae and Salamaua, New Guinea.
- March 12–13 (overnight) – 68 British Vickers Wellington bombers raid Kiel, Germany, losing five of their number.
- March 20 – The Luftwaffe's Fliegerkorps II further escalates its bombing campaign against Malta as truly massive air raids begin with a goal of forcing the island's antiaircraft artillery to exhaust its ammunition and personnel, followed by large attacks on airfields and aircraft on the ground, and finally the destruction of naval forces, dockyards, and other military installations.
- March 21 – HMS Eagle makes the second delivery of Spitfires to Malta, flying off nine.
- March 22 – The Second Battle of Sirte takes place between Royal Navy and Italian forces in the Mediterranean. The Italians fail to prevent a convoy of four Allied cargo ships from arriving at Malta, and an attack by Italian Savoia-Marchetti SM.79 torpedo bombers is ineffective.
- March 23–26 – Fliegerkorps II dedicates 326 aircraft to the destruction of the four Allied cargo ships that have arrived at Malta, sinking three of them and a destroyer and damaging one of them.
- March 26 – Fliegerkorps II begins attacks on Malta's submarine base, sinking the British submarine HMS P39 and damaging two other submarines. From this time, submarines at Malta submerge all day while in port.
- March 26–27 (overnight) – 115 British bombers attack the Ruhr.
- March 29 – HMS Eagle makes the third delivery of Spitfires to Malta, flying off seven.
- March 29–30 (overnight) – In an experiment to see whether a first wave of bombers could start a conflagration in a city center that would guide later waves of bombers to the city during an area bombing attack, 234 British bombers attack Lübeck, Germany. The experiment succeeds, with the center of Lübeck largely destroyed and over 300 people killed.
- March 31
  - An Imperial Japanese Navy task force centered around the aircraft carriers Akagi, Ryūjō, Hiryū, Sōryū, Shōkaku, and Zuikaku begins a very destructive raid against British forces in the Indian Ocean.
  - Since March 1, the Luftwaffe's Fliegerkorps II has flown 4,927 sorties against Malta. In addition to attacks on airfields and other facilities, they have sunk two British destroyers and a British submarine, damaged two other submarines, and badly damaged the light cruiser HMS Penelope.
  - The Soviet Air Force claims to have flown 49,000 sorties against the German Army Group Center since January 1.
- March 31-April 1 (overnight) – The Royal Air Force places the new 4,000-lb (1,814-kg) high-capacity "Cookie" bomb – its largest bomb to date and its first "blockbuster" bomb – into service in a raid on Emden, Germany. The RAF will drop 68,000 "Cookie" bombs during World War II.

=== April ===
- Royal Air Force Bomber Command raids Rostock four times to continue experiments with a first wave of bombers setting a city center on fire to guide later waves to the target. The raids succeed. Of the 520 bombers that take part, eight are lost.
- The Luftwaffe's Fliegerkorps X joins Fliegerkorps II in the heavy German air campaign against Malta.
- The U.S. Army Air Forces create the Ninth Air Force.
- The Fisher Body Division of General Motors creates an Aircraft Division. It eventually will design the Fisher P-75 Eagle.
- April 1 – At Malta's submarine base, German aircraft sink the British submarine HMS Pandora, damage the submarine HMS P36 beyond repair, and badly damage the submarine HMS Unbeaten.
- April 4 – At Malta, German aircraft sink the Greek submarine Glaucos and badly damage the Polish submarine Sokol.
- April 5 – 105 aircraft from the Japanese aircraft carriers Akagi, Hiryū, Sōryū, Shōkaku, and Zuikaku strike Colombo, Ceylon. A second wave sinks the British heavy cruisers HMS Cornwall and HMS Dorsetshire southwest of Ceylon.
- April 9 – 129 aircraft from the Japanese aircraft carriers Akagi, Hiryū, Sōryū, Shōkaku, and Zuikaku strike Trincomalee, Ceylon. A second wave sinks the British aircraft carrier HMS Hermes that afternoon off Batticaloa, Ceylon. Hermes becomes the first aircraft carrier ever to be sunk by aircraft.
- April 10 – The Japanese carrier raiding force departs the Indian Ocean, having destroyed an aircraft carrier, two heavy cruisers, two destroyers, three lesser warships, 23 merchant ships, and over 40 aircraft. No Japanese aircraft carrier will operate in the Indian Ocean again.
- April 10–11 (overnight) – The Royal Air Force introduces its new 8,000-pound (3,600 kg) "Super Cookie" bomb – its largest bomb to date and second of its "blockbuster" bombs – into service in a raid on Essen, Germany. Too big for the bomb bay of the Short Stirling and Vickers Wellington, it can be carried only by the Handley Page Halifax and Avro Lancaster.
- April 12 – The Admiral Superintendent of Malta Dockyard reports that due to German air attacks on Malta's naval base "practically no workshops were in action other than those underground; all docks were damaged; electric power, light and telephones were largely out of action."
- April 17 – Twelve Avro Lancaster bombers – six each from No. 44 (Rhodesia) Squadron and No. 97 Squadron – carry out the longest low-level penetration thus far in World War II and the first daylight raid by the Lancaster in an attack on a submarine diesel engine factory at Augsburg, Germany. The two squadrons fail to rendezvous and four of the No. 44 Squadron bombers, led by South African Air Force Squadron Leader John Dering Nettleton, are shot down by German fighters shortly after crossing the North Sea, but Nettleton pushes on with the two surviving Lancasters and attacks the target against heavy antiaircraft artillery fire. He is awarded the Victoria Cross for the mission. No. 97 Squadron loses one Lancaster.
- April 18
  - Lieutenant Colonel James Doolittle leads the first U.S. attack on the Japanese mainland, leading a force of sixteen U.S. Army Air Forces North American B-25 Mitchells flying from the U.S. Navy aircraft carrier USS Hornet against targets in and around Tokyo in what comes to be known as the "Doolittle Raid".
  - Thanks to labor, management, and financial problems at the Brewster Aeronautical Corporation, the U.S. Navy seizes control of the firm and places it under the oversight of the Navy's Bureau of Aeronautics. The Navy puts George Conrad Westervelt in charge of the company. In May, the Navy also will appoint a new board of directors for Brewster.
- April 20
  - In Operation Calendar, the U.S. Navy aircraft carrier USS Wasp (CV-7) flies off 46 Spitfires to Malta. Detecting their arrival with radar, Fliegerkorps II immediately attacks their airfields, destroying almost all of them within three days.
  - The first official demonstration of a helicopter in the United States takes place.
- April 21 – Lieutenant Commander Edward H. "Butch" O'Hare becomes the first U.S. Navy aviator to receive the Medal of Honor.
- April 22 – The U.S. Army Air Forces form China Ferry Command to support the Allied war effort in the China-Burma-India Theater.
- April 29–30 (overnight) – The Armstrong Whitworth Whitley makes its last raid in RAF Bomber Command service in an attack on Ostend, Belgium.
- April 30 – Since April 1, the Luftwaffe's Fliegerkorps II and Fliegerkorps X have flown 9,599 sorties against Malta, dropping over 6,700 tons (6,078,200 kg) of bombs on or around the island, and the British have lost 30 aircraft on the ground. Royal Air Force fighters on Malta have flown 350 sorties, destroying about half of the aircraft the Axis has lost over the island during April. Since 15 April, Malta has undergone 115 air raids, with a daily average of 170 German bombers attacking.

=== May ===
- France's only aircraft carrier, the obsolete Béarn, is demilitarized at Martinique.
- May 2 – The Japanese seaplane carrier Mizuho sinks with the loss of 101 lives after the U.S. Navy submarine USS Drum (SS-228) had torpedoed her late the previous evening 40 nautical miles (74 kilometres) off Omaezaki, Japan. There are 472 survivors.
- May 3 – In a raid on the Arctic convoy PQ 15, six Heinkel He 111s of the Luftwaffe's I. Gruppe, Kampfgeschwader 26, make Germany's first torpedo bomber attack of World War II. They sink two merchant ships outright and damage a third, which a German submarine later sinks. Three of the He 111s are lost.
- May 4
  - USS Yorktown (CV-5) launches three air strikes against Japanese shipping at Tulagi, sinking a minesweeper and damaging a destroyer and a few other ships.
  - Three Bristol Blenheims of No. 15 Squadron, South African Air Force, on a familiarisation flight from Kufra, Libya, become lost over the Libyan Desert and are forced to land due to fuel exhaustion. One of them is found on May 9 with its entire crew of three dead of exposure, and the other two on May 11 with eight of the nine men with them dead of gunshots or exposure.
- May 5
  - Rabaul-based Imperial Japanese Navy aircraft raid Port Moresby, New Guinea.
  - Operation Ironclad, the British invasion of the Vichy French-controlled island of Madagascar, begins with a destructive surprise strike at dawn by aircraft from the British aircraft carrier HMS Indomitable on French airfields in the vicinity of Diego Suarez.
  - Royal Air Force North American Mustang Mark.I tactical reconnaissance aircraft of No. 26 Squadron see combat over the English Channel. It is the first combat action by any version of the P-51 Mustang.
- May 6 – Four U.S. Army Air Forces Boeing B-17 Flying Fortresses attack the Japanese aircraft carrier Shōhō south of Bougainville, but do not damage her.
- May 7
  - The Battle of the Coral Sea, the first battle ever fought between aircraft carriers, begins between a U.S. force centered around the aircraft carriers USS Lexington (CV-2) and USS Yorktown (CV-5) and a Japanese force with the aircraft carriers Shōhō, Shōkaku, and Zuikaku. Early in the morning, a 56-plane strike from Shōkaku and Zuikaku sinks a destroyer and fatally damages an oiler. Later in the morning, a 93-plane strike from Lexington and Yorktown sinks Shōhō – the first Japanese carrier ever sunk – prompting an American dive bomber pilot to send one of World War II's most famous radio messages, "SCRATCH ONE FLATTOP." In the evening, confused Japanese carrier pilots mistake Yorktown for their own carrier and begin to fly a landing pattern before realizing their mistake.
  - On Madagascar, Diego Suarez falls to invading British forces. Since the invasion began on May 5, aircraft from the British aircraft carriers HMS Indomitable and HMS Illustrious have suppressed Vichy French aircraft, supported British ground forces ashore, attacked coastal artillery, a wrecked a French sloop, and sunk a French armed merchant cruiser and two French submarines.
- May 8 – On the morning of the second and final day of the Battle of the Coral Sea, the two sides launch airstrikes at almost the same time. The strike by 84 aircraft from Lexington and Yorktown badly damages Shōkaku. Shortly afterwards, the 70-plane strike from Shōkaku and Zuikaku sinks Lexington – the first American aircraft carrier ever sunk – and badly damages Yorktown, after which both sides retire with the Japanese abandoning their plans for an amphibious invasion of Port Moresby. Shōkaku's damage and Zuikaku's aircraft losses will keep them out of combat for two months, forcing them to miss the Battle of Midway in June. The Battle of the Coral Sea ends as the first naval battle in which ships of the opposing sides never sight one another.
- May 9
  - The U.S. Navy aircraft carrier USS Wasp (CV-7) and British aircraft carrier HMS Eagle fly off a massive reinforcement of 60 Supermarine Spitfire to Malta.
  - Chief of Staff of the United States Army General George C. Marshall proposes the creation of an organization within the U.S. Army Air Forces similar to the Royal Air Force's Coastal Command. His proposal eventually will lead to the establishment of the Army Air Forces Antisubmarine Command.
- May 10 – The commander of Luftflotte 2, Field Marshal Albert Kesselring, reports to Berlin that "the neutralization of Malta is complete," marking the end of the heavy German air campaign against the island that had begun the previous December. The same day, the newly arrived Spitfires confront Axis aircraft with a superior force over the island for the first time in months, shooting down 12 German aircraft for the loss of three Spitfires.
- May 12 – The initial submission of the Luftwaffe's Amerika Bomber trans-oceanic range strategic bomber design competition arrives in the offices of Reichsmarschall Hermann Göring, commander-in-chief of the Third Reich's Luftwaffe.
- May 13 – Construction of the German aircraft carrier Graf Zeppelin resumes after a two-year hiatus.
- May 15 – The U.S. Navy's Naval Air Transport Service flies it first transoceanic flight and initiates service in the Pacific with a flight by Air Transport Squadron 2 (VR-2) from Alameda, California, to Honolulu, Hawaii.
- May 22 – Imperial Japanese Army Air Force ace Tateo Katō is killed in action when a gunner aboard a Bristol Blenheim Mark IV of Royal Air Force No. 60 Squadron shoots down his Nakajima Ki-43 Hayabusa ("peregrine falcon"; Allied reporting name "Oscar") fighter in flames over the Bay of Bengal. Katō is credited with 18 kills at the time of his death.
- May 27 – 108 German aircraft attack Convoy PQ 16 in the Arctic Ocean.
- May 27–29 – After the aircraft carrier USS Yorktown (CV-5) arrives at Pearl Harbor, Territory of Hawaii, with serious damage from the Battle of the Coral Sea that her task force commander estimates will take 90 days to repair, the Pearl Harbor Navy Yard repairs her in two days, making her available for the Battle of Midway.
- May 30–31 (overnight) – Royal Air Force Bomber Command carries out Operation Millennium, its first "thousand-bomber raid", in which 1,047 British bombers attack Cologne, Germany, killing 480 people and injuring 5,000 and destroying 13,000 homes and damaging 30,000. Forty-one bombers are lost. Fifty-seven more British aircraft operate as night intruders in support of the attack. The Armstrong Whitworth Whitley, retired by Bomber Command a month earlier, participates in a bombing raid for the last time, as Whitleys borrowed from Operational Training Units flesh out the Bomber Command force for the raid.
- May 31
  - Since May 1, the Germans and Italians have lost 40 aircraft over Malta in exchange for 25 British planes lost in combat. The British have lost only six aircraft on the ground, 24 fewer than the previous month.
  - Since January 1, Royal Air Force Bomber Command has dispatched 12,029 sorties, losing 396 aircraft; German night fighters have shot down 167 of them, an average of 34 British bombers per month. Since February 1, aircraft losses in British bombing raids on Germany have averaged 3.7 percent.

=== June ===
- Royal Air Force Bomber Command mounts 20 major raids against Germany in June and July, losing 307 bombers (4.9 percent of the attacking force), as well as an additional 63 bombers lost on lesser raids. Beginning in June, Bomber Command monthly loss rates begin to hover consistently around 5 percent, which the British believe is the maximum sustainable loss rate.
- June 1 – Because of the similarity of the red disc in the center of the national insignia for U.S. military aircraft to Japanese markings, the United States adopts a new national insignia without the red disc, consisting simply of a white star centered in a blue circle. The new marking will remain in use until July 1943.
- June 1–2 (overnight) – Royal Air Force Bomber Command mounts what is nominally its second "thousand-bomber raid" – 956 bombers actually participate – targeting Essen, Germany. Industrial haze spoils the attack; the British bombers kill only 15 people in Essen and destroy only 11 homes there, while widely scattered bombs strike Oberhausen, Duisburg, and at least eleven other cities and towns, which suffer more damage than Essen itself.
- June 3 – In an effort to decoy U.S. forces away from planned Japanese landings on Midway Atoll and to cover planned Japanese landings on Attu and Kiska, aircraft from the carriers Junyo and Ryūjō strike Dutch Harbor in the Aleutian Islands. Although only 12 planes, all from Ryūjō, manage to reach Dutch Harbor, they inflict considerable damage.
- June 4
  - 32 aircraft from Junyo and Ryūjō conduct another damaging strike against Dutch Harbor. Small strikes by U.S. Navy Consolidated PBY Catalina flying boats and U.S. Army Air Forces bombers against the two Japanese aircraft carriers are ineffective.
  - The Battle of Midway begins with a predawn torpedo strike by U.S. Navy Consolidated PBY Catalinas against Japanese ships, which damages an oiler. After sunrise, 108 aircraft from all four Japanese aircraft carriers – Akagi, Kaga, Hiryū, and Sōryū – carry out a destructive strike on Midway Atoll, shooting down 17 and severely damaging seven of the atoll's 26 fighters. A series of Midway-based strikes by various types of aircraft against the Japanese carriers sees the combat debut of the Grumman TBF Avenger, but achieve no hits and suffer heavy losses. All three U.S. aircraft carriers – USS Enterprise (CV-6), USS Hornet (CV-8), and USS Yorktown (CV-5) – launch strikes against the Japanese carriers; their 41 Douglas TBD Devastator torpedo bombers arrive first and achieve no hits, losing all but four of their number, but Enterprise's and Yorktown's Douglas SBD Dauntless dive bombers arrive and inflict lethal damage on Akagi (which sinks on June 5) and Kaga and Soryu (which both sink later on June 4). A retaliatory strike by Hiryu fatally damages Yorktown (which sinks on June 7), but Enterprise and Yorktown dive bombers then fatally damage Hiryu (which sinks on June 5). The loss of all four of their carriers cause the Japanese to cancel the Midway operation and withdraw. It is widely considered to be the turning point of World War II in the Pacific.
- June 6
  - Flying 112 sorties, carrier aircraft from Enterprise and Hornet sink the Japanese heavy cruiser Mikuma as she withdraws from the Midway area, bringing the Battle of Midway to an end. Three Douglas TBD Devastators participate; it is the last combat mission for the Devastator.
  - Four U.S. Army Air Forces Consolidated B-24 Liberator bombers led by Major General Clarence L. Tinker take off from Midway to attack the Japanese bomber base on Wake Island. Tinker's plane disappears after take-off and no wreckage or bodies are ever found.
- June 8 – Conducting experimental visual and photographic observations during night flight, the U.S. Navy blimps G-1 and L-2 are destroyed in a mid-air collision, killing 12.
- June 10 – A U.S. Army Air Forces Consolidated LB-30 Liberator on a reconnaissance flight discovers that Japanese forces have occupied Kiska in the Aleutian Islands.
- June 11 – In response to orders from Admiral Chester W. Nimitz to "bomb the enemy out of Kiska," U.S. Army Air Forces Boeing B-17 Flying Fortress and Consolidated B-24 Liberator bombers and U.S. Navy Consolidated PBY Catalina flying boats begin a bombing campaign against Japanese forces at Kiska in the "Kiska Blitz". The PBYs bomb almost hourly for 72 hours before withdrawing on July 13, while Army Air Forces continue with twice-daily raids until late June. Flying a 1,200-mile (1,900 km) round trip, the Army bombers will continue to raid Kiska from a base on Umnak until September.
- June 14–16 – German and Italian aircraft join Italian surface warships and submarines in opposing Operation Harpoon, an Allied Malta resupply convoy from Gibraltar escorted by the British aircraft carriers HMS Argus and HMS Furious, and Operation Vigorous, a simultaneous resupply convoy from Alexandria, Egypt; Royal Air Force and U.S. Army Air Forces aircraft from Malta and North Africa provide support to the convoys. Before the remnants of the Harpoon convoy arrive at Malta and the Vigorous convoy turns back to Alexandria, Axis aircraft sink three merchant cargo ships, fatally damage three destroyers, a cargo ship, and a tanker, and damage the British light cruisers HMS Birmingham and HMS Liverpool. Royal Air Force Bristol Beaufort torpedo bombers knock the Italian battleship Littorio out of action for two months, and disable the Italian heavy cruiser Trento, allowing a British submarine to sink her.
- June 20 – In North Africa, Axis forces begin the final phase of the Battle of Gazala with a massive aerial bombardment of Tobruk by between 296 and 306 aircraft. Tobruk surrenders the next day.
- June 21–22 – In response to an erroneous report that a Japanese task force is threatening Nome in the Territory of Alaska, 55 U.S. Army Air Forces and commandeered civilian aircraft carry out the first mass airlift in U.S. military history, carrying 2,272 men, 20 antiaircraft guns, and tons of supplies in 179 trips from Anchorage to Nome over a 24-hour period. The airlift will continue until early July.
- June 23 – Germany's latest fighter aircraft, a Focke-Wulf Fw 190, is captured intact when it mistakenly lands at RAF Pembrey in Wales.
- June 25–26 (overnight) – Royal Air Force Bomber Command flies its third "thousand-bomber raid", with 1,067 bombers targeting Bremen, badly damaging the city in exchange for the loss of 55 bombers; night fighters of II Gruppe of the Luftwaffe's Nachtjagdgeschwader 2 alone shoot down 16 of them. The Avro Manchester bomber flies its last combat mission in this raid.
- June 26 – The U.S. Navy's Naval Air Transport Service initiatives service between the United States West Coast and the Territory of Alaska with a flight by Air Transport Squadron 2 (VR-2).
- June 30
  - A United States Navy Martin PBM Mariner sinks U-158, the first of ten German submarines PBMs will sink during World War II.
  - Staffing of the United States Army Air Forces′ Air Corps Tactical School ends, although the school will not formally be abolished until 1946.

=== July ===
- The Luftwaffe's Fliegerkorps II is recalled to bases in Sicily to conduct a new concentrated bombing campaign against Malta. Axis aircraft drop 700 tons (635,036 kg) of bombs and destroy 17 British aircraft on the ground, but the strength of Malta's Royal Air Force fighter defense forces them to suspend their offensive by July 15 after losing 65 aircraft in exchange for 36 British Supermarine Spitfire.
- July 1 – The United States Army Air Forces establish the Air Transport Command, a centralized, strategic air transport service directed by the United States Department of War.
- July 5 – An American reconnaissance plane discovers that the Japanese are building an airfield on Guadalcanal.
- July 7 – The U.S. Army Air Forces activate the China Air Task Force.
- July 10 – The Commander-in-Chief, United States Navy, Admiral Ernest J. King, orders U.S. Navy sea frontier commanders to establish a system by which commercial aviators can report submarine sightings. By November, the five major U.S. airlines, the Naval Air Transport Service, the U.S. Army's Air Transport Command, and British flying boats on transatlantic routes all are involved.
- July 15 – The Republic of China Air Force's American Volunteer Group – the "Flying Tigers" – is transferred to the United States Army Air Forces, in which it becomes the 23rd Fighter Group. In its six months of Chinese service, the unit has claimed 286 Japanese aircraft in exchange for 12 of its own lost in air-to-air combat.
- July 18 – The Me 262 third prototype makes its first flight under jet power, test-piloted by Fritz Wendel. Previous flight attempts starting in April 1941 by the first prototype airframe had been driven by a Junkers Jumo 210 piston engine, spinning a propeller in the fuselage's nose before any of its intended jet engines were flight-ready.
- July 22 – The first Lockheed P-38F Lightning fighters of the U.S. Army Air Forces' 14th Fighter Group depart Presque Isle, Maine, for the United Kingdom via Iceland. They become the first fighters to fly across the Atlantic Ocean.
- July 28–29 (overnight) – 256 British bombers attack Hamburg, Germany, with the loss of 30 aircraft, an unacceptably high 11.7 percent loss rate.
- July 31 – The vast, 800 km (500 mi) searchlight belt Germany has developed to guide night fighters to British bombers along their routes into and out of Germany is ordered disbanded so that the searchlights may be reallocated to the point defense of individual German cities. The searchlight belt is replaced by an even deeper belt of ground radars, allowing far more radar-controlled interception of enemy aircraft by German night fighters.

=== August ===
- The U.S. Navy light cruiser USS Cleveland (CL-55) conducts the first shipboard tests of anti-aircraft ammunition employing the Mark 32 ("VT") proximity fuse, firing at drone aircraft over the Chesapeake Bay.
- August 2 – The first yanagi trans-oceanic submarine mission by the Imperial Japanese Navy is carried out by the Japanese submarine I-30, intended to make contact and conduct transfer of military technology with Nazi Germany arrives in occupied French waters on this date, and is escorted to the Lorient U-boat base; among the items of transfer are the blueprints for the IJN's Type 91 aerial torpedo, which Germany intended to produce for its own needs as the Lufttorpedo LT 850.
- August 4 – The Lockheed P-38 Lightning fighter scores its first aerial victories, when two P-38s of the 343rd Fighter Group flown by U.S. Army Air Forces Lieutenants K. Ambrose and S. A. Long shoot down two Japanese Kawanishi H6K4 flying boats near the Aleutian Islands.
- August 7 – Operation Watchtower, the U.S. invasion of Guadalcanal, Tulagi, Gavutu, and Tanambogo, begins. The aircraft carriers USS Enterprise (CV-6) and USS Saratoga (CV-3) cover the landings with airstrikes, and U.S. Army Air Forces Boeing B-17 Flying Fortresses bomb Japanese airfields at Rabaul. Rabaul-based Japanese aircraft attack U.S. transports and their escorts off Guadalcanal, and dogfights with aircraft from Enterprise and Saratoga ensue.
- August 8 – U.S. Marines capture the partially completed Japanese airstrip on Guadalcanal. They will rename it Henderson Field, and it will be the focal point of the six-month Guadalcanal campaign. Offshore, Rabaul-based Japanese aircraft damage a U.S. transport, which becomes a total loss.
- August 11 – Axis opposition to Operation Pedestal – an Allied resupply convoy to Malta escorted by the British aircraft carriers HMS Victorious, HMS Indomitable, and HMS Eagle, against which 1,000 Axis aircraft have gathered in Sicily and Sardinia – begins when the German submarine U-73 hits Eagle with four torpedoes in the Mediterranean Sea about 80 nautical miles (150 kilometres) north of Algiers. Eagle sinks in eight minutes, with the loss of 131 of her crew and 16 Sea Hurricane fighters. German torpedo planes launch ineffective attacks on the convoys, and a strike by Royal Air Force Bristol Beaufighter destroys five and damages 14 of the German aircraft on the ground after they return to base.
- August 12
  - The first American aircraft – a U.S. Navy PBY-5A Catalina amphibian – lands on Guadalcanal's Henderson Field. Aircraft based there will become known as the "Cactus Air Force".
  - German and Italian aircraft attack the Pedestal convoy in the Mediterranean, damaging HMS Indomitable, sinking a destroyer and a merchant cargo ship, and possibly inflicting fatal damage on two other cargo ships. Italian aircraft employ three new weapons for the first time: the motobomba torpedo, a new bomb dropped by Re.2001 fighters designed to cause maximum damage on aircraft carrier flight decks, and an explosive-laden uncrewed Savoia-Marchetti SM.79 bomber controlled as a guided missile by a CANT floatplane. The motobombas strike no targets, one of the flight-deck bombs is dropped onto the deck of HMS Victorious but breaks up and fails to explode, and the SM.79 drone goes out of control and flies inland to crash in Algeria.
- August 13 – Attacking the Pedestal convoy, Axis aircraft sink two more cargo ships and inflict additional damage on a tanker.
- August 14 – Flying a Lockheed P-38 Lightning fighter of the 27th Fighter Squadron, Lieutenant Elza Shaham becomes the first U.S. Army Air Forces pilot to score an aerial victory in Europe during World War II when he shoots down a German Focke-Wulf Fw 200C-3 Condor.
- August 16 – During a routine antisubmarine warfare patrol over the Pacific Ocean off California, the two-man crew of the U.S. Navy blimp L-8 disappears. The uncrewed blimp then drifts over California and eventually crashes on a street in Daly City, California. A U.S. Navy investigation concludes that the crew left the blimp voluntarily without their parachutes, but determines no reason for them to have done so. L-8 is repaired and returns to service, but no trace of the two missing crewmen is ever found.
- August 17 – Heavy bombers of the United States Army Air Forces' Eighth Air Force carry out their first raid, attacking a railroad marshalling yard at Rouen, France.
- August 18–19 (overnight) – Royal Air Force Bomber Command's Pathfinder Force flies its first mission, with 31 Pathfinder aircraft attempting to mark the target – the German submarine base at Flensburg – for a main force of 87 bombers. The raid is a complete failure; Flensburg is untouched, and the aircraft scatter their bombs widely over the towns of Sønderborg and Aabenraa in Denmark. One Pathfinder aircraft and three other bombers fail to return.
- August 19 – The Soviet Sinyavino Offensive, an unsuccessful attempt to break the Siege of Leningrad, begins, supported by the Soviet Air Force′s 14th Air Army. Although the 14th Air Army has a two-to-one superiority in numbers over opposing Luftwaffe forces, the Germans maintain air superiority in the area until the offensive ends on 10 October.
- August 20 – The U.S. Army Air Forces activate the Twelfth Air Force.
- August 21
  - Flying a Grumman F4F Wildcat, U.S. Marine Corps Major John L. Smith scores the first aerial victory by a Henderson Field-based aircraft, shooting down a Mitsubishi A6M Zero over Guadalcanal.
  - Baron Carl-August von Gablenz, the founder of Deutsche Luft Hansa, is among two people killed when the Siebel Si 204 he is piloting suffers a mechanical failure and crashes at Mühlberg, Germany.
- August 24
  - Flying a Spitfire Mark V specially modified for high-altitude flight, Royal Air Force Flying Officer George Reynolds intercepts a German Junkers Ju 86P reconnaissance plane – near Cairo, Egypt, at 37,000 feet (11,000 meters). Based on Crete and beginning reconnaissance operations over Egypt in May, Ju 86Ps of the Luftwaffe′s Long-Range Reconnaissance Group 123 previously had flown with impunity because Allied fighters could not reach their operating altitude. Although the Ju 86P climbs to 42,000 feet (13,000 meters), Reynolds manages to fire at it before it escapes. The RAF concludes that it must further lighten a Spitfire so that it can intercept the Ju 86Ps.
  - The Luftwaffe begins high-altitude nuisance raids against England by Junkers Ju 86R bombers carrying one 250 kg (550 lb) bomb each and capable of flying as high as 47,000 feet (14,000 meters). On the first day, two Ju 86R-2s drop one bomb each on Camberley and Southampton, doing little damage, and a Polish Royal Air Force Spitfire squadron that attempts to intercept the Ju 86Rs fail to reach the altitude of the bombers. The Luftwaffe will conduct ten more of the raids over the next three weeks.
- August 24–25 – The Battle of the Eastern Solomons takes place north of the Solomon Islands. It includes an aircraft carrier action on August 24, during which U.S. Navy carrier aircraft sink the Japanese aircraft carrier Ryūjō, while Japanese carrier aircraft heavily damage the U.S. aircraft carrier USS Enterprise (CV-6).
- August 24–25 (overnight) – 226 British bombers attack Frankfurt-am-Main, Germany, but most of their bombs land well west of the city; 16 aircraft do not return, including five Pathfinders.
- August 25
  - U.S. Marine Corps Douglas SBD Dauntless dive bombers conduct the first bombing raid by Henderson Field-based aircraft, attacking Japanese shipping approaching Guadalcanal.
  - Dunbeath air crash: Flying in poor visibility, a Royal Air Force No. 228 Squadron Short Sunderland crashes into a hillside near Dunbeath, Scotland, killing all but one of the 15 people on board including Prince George, Duke of Kent.
- August 26 – Adolf Hitler orders the incomplete heavy cruiser Seydlitz to be completed as an aircraft carrier.
- August 27–28 (overnight) – 306 British bombers attack Kassel, Germany, with the loss of 31 aircraft, a high loss rate of 10.1 percent. However, the Pathfinders are more effective and the sky over Kassel is clear, and the raid is moderately successful.
- August 28 – A Luftwaffe high-altitude Junkers Ju 86R bomber drops a 250 kg (550 lb) bomb into Bristol, England, during the morning rush hour, destroying several buses, killing 48 civilians, and injuring 56 others.
- August 28–29 (overnight) – A raid by 159 British bombers against Nuremberg, Germany, suffers an even higher loss rate of 14.5 percent as 23 aircraft fail to return, although the raid again is moderately successful. "Red Blob", Bomber Command's first target indicator, is used to mark the target for the first time, glowing a distinctive red.
- August 29
  - Flying a Spitfire Mark V specially modified for high-altitude flight, Royal Air Force Pilot Officer George Genders intercepts a German Junkers Ju 86P high-altitude reconnaissance plane over Egypt and damages it before his guns jam. It ditches in the Mediterranean Sea on its way back to its base on Crete, giving the Allies their first victory over a Ju 86P flying at high altitude.
- August 31 – Since June 1, Royal Air Force Bomber Command has dispatched 11,169 sorties and lost 531 aircraft, of which German night fighters have shot down 349, averaging 116 kills per month.

=== September ===
- Italy begins conversion of the passenger liner MS Augustus into its second aircraft carrier, originally named Falco ("falcon") and later renamed Sparviero ("Sparrow"). The conversion will halt when Italy surrenders to the Allies in September 1943 and never will be completed.
- The U.S. Navy and Pan American World Airways sign a contract under which the Naval Air Transportation Service takes control of Pan American's Martin M-130 and Boeing 314 flying boats for Navy use in service between California and the Territory of Hawaii for the duration of World War II. Pan American employees become Navy personnel until the end of the war.
- September 1–2 (overnight) – Due to heavy German jamming of Gee, Royal Air Force Bomber Command Pathfinder aircraft go astray, marking the wrong city, and the force of 231 British bombers that sets out to attack Saarbrücken instead bombs Saarlouis 15 km (9.3 mi) to the northwest.
- September 2
  - Operating in support of German ground forces opposing the Soviet Sinyavino Offensive, an unsuccessful attempt to break the Siege of Leningrad, the Luftwaffe′s Jagdgeschwader 54 and Jagdgeschwader 77 complete a two-day stretch in which they shoot down 42 aircraft of the Soviet Air Force′s 14th Air Army. German pilots report Soviet aircraft refusing combat over the front during the offensive – which lasts from 19 August to 10 October – thanks to the one-sided results, prompting Josef Stalin to threaten to court-martial any Soviet pilot who refuses to engage German aircraft.
  - The only test flight of the Soviet Antonov A-40 winged tank is partially successful. Although A-40's aerodynamic drag forces the Tupolev TB-3 towing it to detach it early to avoid crashing, the A-40 glides to a successful landing and drives back to base as a conventional T-60 tank. The A-40 project nonetheless is abandoned due to the lack of aircraft powerful enough to tow it.
- September 4–5 (overnight) – 251 British bombers attack Bremen, Germany. For the first time, Bomber Command uses three waves of Pathfinders – "illuminators" dropping flares followed by "visual markers" who drop colored target indicators followed by "backers-up" who drop incendiary bombs – to mark the target. Bremen suffers serious damage.
- September 5 – Flying a Spitfire Mark V specially modified for high-altitude flight, Royal Air Force Pilot Officer George Genders intercepts a German Junkers Ju 86P high-altitude reconnaissance plane over Egypt and chases it 80 miles (130 km) out to sea over the Mediterranean. Genders runs out of fuel and is forced to ditch his Spitfire off the Egyptian coast and make a 21-hour swim to shore, but not before he damages the Ju 86P enough to force it to descend to a lower altitude, where another Spitfire damages it further and forces it to crash-land behind German lines in the North African desert. After two inconclusive encounters at altitude between Ju 86Ps and Spitfires over Egypt in October, the Luftwaffe will withdraw the Ju 86P from high-altitude flights over defended targets.
- September 6 – The U.S. Navy's Naval Air Transport Service makes its first flight to Naval Station Argentia in the Dominion of Newfoundland, the beginning of an expansion of its service along the United States East Coast and in the Atlantic which by the end of September will reach the Panama Canal Zone and Rio de Janeiro, Brazil, and briefly will include Iceland.
- September 7 – The Naval Air Transport Service establishes a detachment at Pearl Harbor, Hawaii, which begins survey flights as a first step in establishing routes between San Francisco, California, and Brisbane, Australia.
- September 9
  - An Imperial Japanese Navy Yokosuka E14Y floatplane (Allied reporting name "Glen") launched by the submarine I-25 makes two attacks against the coast of Oregon in the United States, dropping four 76 kg (168 lb) phosphorus bombs in an attempt to start forest fires. They become known as the Lookout Air Raids. It is the only time that an enemy aircraft bombs the continental United States during World War II.
  - The British escort aircraft carrier HMS Avenger joins Convoy PQ 18, bound from Loch Ewe, Scotland, to Archangel in the Soviet Union, as an escort. She is the first aircraft carrier to escort an Arctic convoy;
- September 10 – The United States Army Air Forces Air Transport Command establishes the Women's Auxiliary Ferrying Squadron (WAFS), an organization of civilian women pilots who ferry military aircraft from factories to airfields to free male pilots for combat duty.
- September 10–11 (overnight) – Royal Air Force Bomber Command employs "Pink Pansy" – a target indicator that creates an instantaneous pink flash – for the first time during a raid by 479 bombers on Düsseldorf, Germany. It is the most successful Pathfinder-led raid yet, but 33 bombers (6.9 percent) are lost.
- September 12
  - Flying a Supermarine Spitfire modified for high-altitude flight, Royal Air Force Pilot Officer Emanuel Galatzine intercepts a German Junkers Ju 86R bomber over southern England. During a 45-minute dogfight, Galatzine makes four firing passes at the Ju 86R, reaching an altitude of 44,000 feet (13,000 meters) before the Ju 86R escapes over the English Channel. It is the highest combat engagement of World War II. Learning that even the twin-Jumo 207 diesel-powered Ju 86R has become susceptible to interception, the Luftwaffe never flies one over the United Kingdom again.
  - After German Blohm und Voss BV 138 flying boat snoopers draw away Hawker Sea Hurricane fighters from HMS Avenger, German Heinkel He 111 bombers attack Convoy PQ 18, sinking eight merchant ships. with torpedoes.
- September 13 – U.S. Army Air Forces bombers fly a 1,200-mile (1,900 km) round-trip raid against Japanese forces at Kiska in the Aleutian Islands from Umnak for the last time. They will begin flying raids from Adak, 400 miles (640 km) closer to Kiska, the following day.
- September 13–14 – German Heinkel He 111s and Junkers Ju 88s attack Convoy PQ 18. Hawker Sea Hurricanes from HMS Avenger remain with the convoy and put up a more effective defense, and no merchant ships are lost. During the three days of German air attacks, the Sea Hurricanes defending PQ 18 shoot down five German aircraft and damage 21 others.
- September 14
  - Chief of Staff of the United States Army General George C. Marshall informs Chief of Naval Operations Admiral Ernest J. King that he is directing the establishment of the Army Air Forces Antisubmarine Command.
  - In the first U.S. strike from Adak, the U.S. Army Air Forces fly the first combined zero-altitude strike by fighters and bombers of World War II. Twelve Consolidated B-24 Liberators, 14 Lockheed P-38 Lightnings, and 14 Bell P-39 Airacobras attack Japanese forces at Kiska. Flying 240 miles (390 km) at wave-top level and attacking at an altitude of 50 feet (15 meters), they sink two Japanese ships and set three on fire and destroy three midget submarines, several buildings, and 12 Japanese floatplane fighters, and kill over 200 Japanese soldiers.
- September 15
  - The Japanese submarine I-19 torpedoes and sinks the U.S. Navy aircraft carrier USS Wasp (CV-7) southeast of the Solomon Islands.
  - German Luftwaffe ace Hans-Joachim Marseille shoots down seven British Curtiss Kittyhawk fighters on a single mission over North Africa. Among them is his 150th aerial victory.
  - The United States Army Air Forces Air Transport Command establishes the 319th Women's Flying Training Detachment (WFTD), a second organization of civilian women ferry pilots and rival of the Women's Auxiliary Ferrying Squadron (WAFS) established five days earlier. Neither the WAFS nor the WFTD acknowledges the existence of the other.
- Mid-September – The British aircraft carrier HMS Illustrious supports a British amphibious landing during a week of attacks on the southern coast of Vichy French-controlled Madagascar during the British occupation of the island.
- September 16–17 (overnight) – 369 British bombers attack Germany, losing 39 of their number, a very high 10.6 percent loss rate. One German night fighter pilot, Hauptmann Reinhold Knacke, shoots down five bombers during the night.
- September 21 – Convoy PQ 18 arrives at Archangel in the Soviet Union. During its voyage, aircraft from the British aircraft carrier HMS Avenger have attacked 16 German submarines and contributed to the sinking of one, and Avenger's fighters and the convoy's antiaircraft guns have shot down 41 German aircraft. Because of these high losses, German aircraft rarely attack Arctic convoys again.
- September 30
  - German ace Hans-Joachim Marseille is killed when his Bf 109G aircraft catches fire. He has 158 victories at the time.
  - Since June 1, German night fighters defending Germany have shot down 435 British bombers.
  - The pilot of an Imperial Japanese Navy Nakajima A6M2-N (Allied reporting name "Rufe") floatplane fighter discovers the American base on Adak in the Aleutian Islands, a month after it was established. Japanese aircraft from Kiska bomb Adak daily for the next five days, but their biggest raid, on October 4, consists of only three planes. The rest of the raids consist of one plane each, and Adak suffers almost no damage.

=== October ===
- The U.S. Army Air Forces activate the India Air Task Force.
- U.S. military planners decide that no new Boeing B-17 Flying Fortresses will be sent to the Pacific Theater after the end of the month. Thereafter, U.S. Army Air Forces units in the Pacific will begin to re-equip with the longer-ranged Consolidated B-24 Liberator, and all new B-17 production will be devoted to the strategic bombing campaign in the European Theater.
- October 3 – The first A4 rocket, later dubbed the V-2, flies from Peenemünde, covering 190 km (120 mi) in 296 seconds at five times the speed of sound, reaching an altitude of 84.5 km (52.5 mi).
- October 9 – The United States Army Air Forces establish the Army Air Forces School of Applied Tactics at Orlando Army Airbase, Florida.
- October 14 – The Japanese battleships Kongō and Haruna bombard Guadalcanal's Henderson Field, firing 973 14-inch (356-mm) shells in 1 hour 23 minutes. The shelling kills 41 men and leaves only 42 aircraft operational out of 90 at the airfield.
- October 18 – A Royal Air Force Vickers Wellington of the Czech-crewed No. 311 Squadron crashes on approach to RAF Northolt, killing all on board and six on the ground.
- October 21 – On a flight from Hawaii to Canton Island, a Boeing B-17D Flying Fortress carrying the top-scoring U.S. World War I ace, Eddie Rickenbacker, on a tour of U.S. Pacific bases strays hundreds of miles off course due to faulty navigational equipment and ditches in the Pacific Ocean due to fuel exhaustion. All seven men aboard get into life rafts. They will remain adrift for 22 days before being rescued.
- October 22–23 (overnight) – In support of Allied operations in North Africa, RAF Bomber Command mounts the first of 14 night attacks against targets in Italy, the last of which is flown on the night of December 11–12. The series of raids consists of night attacks on Genoa, Milan, and Turin and one daylight raid against Turin. Dispatching 1,752 sorties against Italian targets, it loses only 31 bombers (1.8 percent). During the same period, Bomber Command flies only five major night attacks against Germany.
- October 23 – A U.S. Army Air Forces Lockheed B-34 Lexington bomber collides with a Douglas DC-3 airliner operating as American Airlines Flight 28 over California. The B-34 lands safely, but the DC-3 crashes into Chino Canyon, killing all 12 people on board including songwriter Ralph Rainger.
- October 26 – An aircraft carrier action takes place northeast of the Solomon Islands during the Battle of the Santa Cruz Islands. U.S. Navy carrier aircraft badly damage the Japanese aircraft carriers Shōkaku and Zuihō, while Japanese carrier aircraft fatally damage the aircraft carrier USS Hornet (CV-8). The abandoned Hornet is finished off by Japanese destroyers early the next morning. becoming the only U.S. fleet carrier ever to be sunk by enemy surface ships.

=== November ===
- November 6 – The Martin Marauder I (British designation for the Martin B-26A Marauder) makes its operational debut in the Royal Air Force, flying with No. 14 Squadron in Egypt.
- November 7 – A U.S. Army Air Forces bomber discovers that Japanese forces are occupying Attu in the Aleutian Islands. American aircraft soon begin a bombing campaign against Attu.
- November 8 – Operation Torch – the Allied amphibious landings in French North Africa – take place, supported by the British aircraft carriers HMS Victorious, HMS Formidable, HMS Argus, HMS Avenger, HMS Biter, and HMS Dasher with 160 aircraft and the American carriers USS Ranger (CV-4), USS Sangamon (ACV-26), USS Suwannee (ACV-27), USS Chenango (ACV-28), and USS Santee (ACV-29) with 136 aircraft. French aircraft resist the landings, strafing the landing beaches at least five times, and aerial combat occurs between U.S. Navy Grumman F4F Wildcats and French Dewoitine D.520 and Curtiss Hawk 75A fighters. During the Naval Battle of Casablanca that day, U.S. Navy aircraft bomb and strafe French ships, helping to sink or wreck the light cruiser Primauguet, a destroyer leader, and two destroyers. Off Algiers, 21 German Junkers Ju 88s and Heinkel He 111s attack Allied ships, fatally damaging the transport USS Leedstown (AP-73) and damaging other ships.
- November 9 – French high-level bombers attack U.S. landing beaches in North Africa and U.S. ships offshore, but do no damage. SOC-3 floatplanes from the light cruiser USS Savannah (CL-42) experiment with the use of depth charges to destroy French tanks, with great success. Six F4F Wildcats from USS Ranger engage 11 Dewoitine D.520s, shooting down five and damaging four, and a lone Messerschmitt Bf 109 is shot down over the beach.
- November 10 – USS Chenango flies off 75 U.S. Army Air Forces Curtiss P-40 Warhawk fighters, which establish a base at Port Lyautey, French Morocco. Douglas SBD Dauntless dive bombers from USS Ranger damage the French battleship Jean Bart in Casablanca harbor.
- November 11 – Hostilities between Allied and French forces in French North Africa end. Since November 8, U.S. Navy planes have shot down 20 French aircraft in air-to-air combat and destroyed many more on the ground, losing 44 U.S. Navy aircraft in exchange.
- November 13 – A U.S. Navy Vought OS2U Kingfisher floatplane rescues U.S. World War I ace Eddie Rickenbacker and two other survivors of a ditched Boeing B-17D Flying Fortress from a life raft. They had been adrift in the Pacific for 22 days.
- November 14 – During the Naval Battle of Guadalcanal, U.S. Navy aircraft from the aircraft carrier USS Enterprise (CV-6) and U.S. Marine Corps aircraft from Henderson Field fatally damage the crippled Japanese battleship Hiei in Ironbottom Sound north of Guadalcanal in a series of air strikes during the day. Hiei sinks that evening.
- November 14 – The German submarine U-155 torpedoes and sinks the British aircraft carrier HMS Avenger off Gibraltar with the loss of all but 17 of her crew.
- November 16 – A Consolidated B-24D Liberator of the 1st Antisubmarine Squadron based at St. Eval in the United Kingdom flies the first operational mission of the U.S. Army Air Forces Antisubmarine Command.
- November 20 – The completion of the Alaska ("Alcan") Highway allows the opening of the Northwest Staging Route. It includes flights of American-made Lend-Lease aircraft from Great Falls, Montana, to Fairbanks, Territory of Alaska, where they are turned over to Soviet pilots who fly them to Nome, Alaska, and then on to Siberia via the Alaska-Siberia (ALSIB) route. By December 31, the United States will have supplied 148 aircraft to the Soviet Union via this route.
- November 24 – Italian World War I ace and aviation pioneer Guido Masiero and Italian test pilot Francesco Agello are killed when the Macchi C.202 fighters they are testing collide in mid-air in heavy fog over Milan, Italy.
- November 28 – Royal Australian Air Force pilot Flight Sergeant Ron Middleton earns a posthumous Victoria Cross for valour in bringing his crew and crippled bomber home after a raid on Turin, Italy.

=== December ===
- The Royal Air Force begins airborne jamming of German Freya and Mammut radars with Mandrel jammers carried aboard Boulton Paul Defiants of No. 515 Squadron flying over the North Sea off the coast of the Netherlands on a patrol line known as the "Mandrel Screen".
- Royal Air Force bombers begin to employ "Tinsel", a device to jam German night-fighter controllers' speech radio frequencies.
- December 1 – Germany orders the complete dissolution of the Vichy French armed forces, including the Vichy French Air Force.
- December 3 – A Vickers Wellington bomber specially equipped with electronic measuring equipment collects the frequency of the airborne Lichtenstein radar used by German night fighters for the first time. The information will allow the British to field an operational jammer to counter the radar in late April 1943.
- December 4 – United States Army Air Forces bombers make their first raid on Italy.
- December 9 – 18 U.S. Army Air Forces Boeing B-17 Flying Fortresses conduct the first major air strike against the Japanese airfield at Munda Point on New Georgia in the Solomon Islands. Air strikes against the airfield become routine thereafter.
- December 13 – U.S. Navy Consolidated PBY Catalina flying boats begin night harassment raids against Munda airfield.
- December 15 – A Western Airlines Douglas DC-3A-191 (registration NC16060) crashes near Fairfield, Utah, after performing a violent maneuver during a flight from Salt Lake City Municipal Airport in Salt Lake City, Utah, to Los Angeles, California. Seventeen of the 19 people on board die.
- December 17 – A U.S. Army Air Forces reconnaissance and bombing raid on Amchitka in the Aleutian Islands destroys every building in the deserted Aleut village there, although no Japanese are on the island.
- December 20–21 (overnight) – A de Havilland Mosquito of Royal Air Force Bomber Command uses the Oboe blind bombing targeting system operationally for the first time in a raid against a power station at Lutterade in the Netherlands.
- December 24 – A major U.S. airstrike against Munda airfield destroys four Mitsubishi A6M Zeroes in the air, 10 more on takeoff, and 12 waiting to take off. Later in the day, additional strikes destroy Japanese landing barges and bomb the airfield's runway.
- Late December – U.S. Army Air Forces Boeing B-17 Flying Fortresses conduct a weeklong series of nightly strikes against Japanese shipping in Simpson Harbor at Rabaul on New Britain, sinking one transport and damaging three transports and the destroyer Tachikaze.
- December 30 – 31 U.S. Army Air Forces and U.S. Navy aircraft drop 42,000 pounds (19,000 kg) of bombs in a night raid on Kiska, but the Japanese trick them into bombing a wrecked hulk instead of a newly arrived, fully loaded transport. They do damage some midget submarines and destroy a Nakajima A6M2-N (Allied reporting name "Rufe") floatplane fighter on the water in exchange for the loss of four aircraft.
- December 31
  - A small force of Axis bombers attacks Casablanca, French Morocco.
  - During 1942, the U.S. Army Air Forces' Eleventh Air Force has destroyed at least 50 Japanese aircraft in the Aleutian Islands campaign in exchange for the loss of 12 aircraft in combat and almost 80 to other causes. Japanese non-combat aircraft losses in the Aleutian Islands have been equally high. Since October 1, Eleventh Air Force aircraft have dropped 500,000 pounds (230,000 kg) of bombs on Japanese bases in the Aleutians.
  - During 1942, German night fighters defending Germany have shot down 687 British bombers.
- December 31-January 1 (overnight) – Guided by an Oboe-equipped Mosquito, eight Pathfinder Force Avro Lancasters bomb on sky markers suspended by parachute for the first time in a raid on Düsseldorf. Bomber Command previously had employed only ground markers, and the new capability allows British bombers to bomb through ten-tenths cloud cover.

== First flights ==
- Early 1942 – Focke-Wulf Fw 191

=== January ===
- January 7 - Supermarine Seafire
- January 13 - Sikorsky XR-4 helicopter

=== February ===
- Bell XP-39E, later redesignated XP-76, prototype of the planned Bell P-76 and early predecessor of the Bell P-63 Kingcobra
- Miles M.30 X-Minor
- February 14 – Douglas C-54 Skymaster, first version of the Douglas DC-4 to fly
- February 23 – Polikarpov ITP
- February 27 – Blackburn Firebrand

=== March ===
- Focke-Achgelis Fa 330 rotor kite
- March 20 - Mitsubishi J2M Raiden ("Thunderbolt"), Allied reporting name "Jack"

=== April ===
- April 24 - Miles M.25 Martinet prototype LR241
- April 26 - XB-28 Dragon

=== May ===
- Aichi B7A Ryusei ("Shooting Star"), Allied reporting name "Grace"
- Aichi E16A Zuiun ("Auspicious Cloud"), Allied reporting name "Paul"
- May 1 – Miles M.35 Libellula
- May 6 – Kawanishi N1K1 Kyofu ("Mighty Wind"), Allied reporting name "Rex"
- May 21 – Northrop XP-61 Black Widow prototype

=== June ===
- June 26 – Grumman XF6F-1 Hellcat prototype

=== July ===
- Kawasaki Ki-66
- July 3 – Martin XPB2M-1, prototype of the Martin JRM Mars
- July 5 – Avro York
- July 10 – Douglas A-26 Invader
- July 16 – Junkers Ju 290
- July 18 – Messerschmitt Me 262 (first flight under jet power)

=== August ===
- August 1 – Junkers Ju 252
- August 24 – XC-87, prototype of the Consolidated C-87 Liberator Express
- August 31 – Martin-Baker MB 3

=== September ===
- September 2 – Hawker Tempest
- September 7 – Consolidated XB-32 Dominator, prototype of the Consolidated B-32 Dominator
- September 12 – Miles M.38 Messenger
- September 21 – Boeing XB-29 Superfortress prototype

=== October ===
- North American A-36 Apache, also known as A-36 Invader and precursor to P-51 Mustang
- October 1 or 2 – Bell XP-59A Airacomet prototype
- October 18 Payen PA-22

=== November ===
- Kyushu K11W Shiragiku ("White Chrysanthemum")
- November 1 – Westland Welkin
- November 4 or 11 (sources vary) – Latécoère 631
- November 8 – Grumman XF4F-8, prototype of the Eastern Aircraft FM-2 Wildcat
- November 11 – Lockheed XP-49
- November 15 – Heinkel He 219
- November 18 – Tachikawa Ki-77
- November 23 – Vought V-173
- November 30 – North American XP-51B, originally designated XP-78, the first P-51 Mustang with a Packard Merlin engine

=== December ===
- Messerschmitt Me 264
- December 7 – Bell XP-63 Kingcobra prototype
- December 19 – Piaggio P.119
- December 26 – Kawasaki Ki-78
- December 27
  - Kawanishi N1K1-J Shiden ("Violet Lightning"), Allied reporting name "George"
  - Mitsubishi Ki-67 Hiryu ("Flying Dragon"), Allied reporting name "Peggy"

== Entered service ==
- Aichi H9A
- Beriev Be-4 with Soviet Naval Aviation in the Black Sea Fleet
- Cessna UC-77 and UC-77A with the United States Army Air Forces
- Autumn 1942 – Nakajima J1N Gekko ("Moonlight"), Allied reporting name "Irving", with the Imperial Japanese Navy

=== January ===
- Grumman TBF Avenger with United States Navy Torpedo Squadron 8 (VT-8)

=== February ===
- Avro Lancaster with No. 44 Squadron, Royal Air Force
- North American Mustang Mark I, Royal Air Force version of the P-51A Mustang, with No. 26 Squadron

=== March ===
- Saab 17 with the Flygvapnet

=== April ===
- Douglas P-70 with the United States Army Air Forces
- Henschel Hs 129 with the German Luftwaffe

=== May ===
- Nakajima Ki-44 Shoki ("Devil-Queller"), Allied reporting name "Tojo", with 47th Independent Squadron, Imperial Japanese Army Air Force
- Yokosuka D4Y Suisei ("Comet"), Allied reporting name "Judy", aboard the Imperial Japanese Navy aircraft carrier Soryu

=== August ===
- Auster I with No. 654 Squadron, Royal Air Force

=== September ===
- September 7 – Vought F4U Corsair with United States Marine Corps Marine Fighter Squadron 124

== Retirements ==
- Beriev Be-2 by Soviet Naval Aviation
- Blohm & Voss BV 142 by the German Luftwaffe
- Late 1942 – Saunders-Roe A.36 Lerwick by the Royal Canadian Air Force′s No. 422 and No. 423 Squadrons

=== March ===
- Avro 652 by the Royal Navy′s Fleet Air Arm
