= Mischgerät (V-2 guidance computer) =

Electronic analog stability computer used in the V-2 SRBM

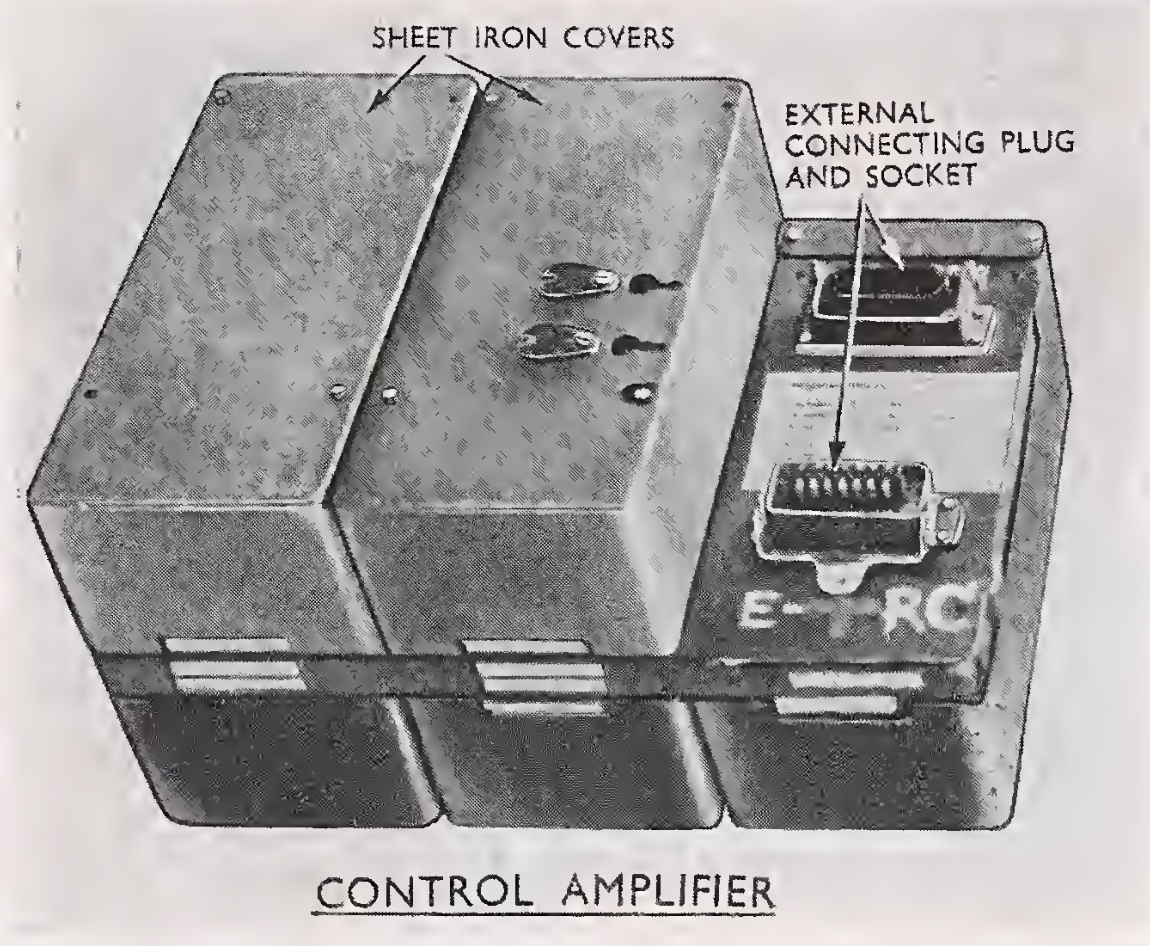
- A photo of the "Mischgerät" V-2 stability control computer, drawn from "Report on Operation BACKFIRE", Volume II, p141, Figure 107.
- Also known as: Autopilot servo amplifier
- Developer: Helmut Hölzer
- Manufacturer: C. Lorenz AG, General Electric, Scientific-Research Institute No.885
- Type: Electronic analog computer
- Released: 1941
- Introductory price: 6 ℛℳ
- Units shipped: ~6000
- Power: 40VAC @ 500Hz
- Dimensions: (inches) : 13" x 9.75" x 7" (mm) : 330 x 247.6 x 177.8
- Weight: 32 lb (15 kg)
- Successor: Redstone LEV-3

Designed in 1941 by Helmut Hölzer, the Mischgerät (mixer device) was the first fully electronic computing device, used to implement Hölzer’s V-2 rocket stability control equation during powered flight. It derived angular rate information from the attitude gyroscopes and mixed the signals to derive an individual control signal for each steering servo.

It differentiated the voltages from the Vertikant (yaw and roll) and Horizont (pitch) gyroscopes to sense the gyro platform's divergence from its original orientation in pitch, yaw and roll, - and more crucially derived the rate of divergence - and output amplified correcting voltages to the steering servos for the exhaust vanes and external rudders.

Technical concepts tested with the smaller A5 research rocket included use of the Siemens Vertikant stability control system with rate gyros. This approach didn't scale well for the larger and higher performance V-2.

From his previous glider ground speed indicator concept in the mid-1930s, Hölzer realized he could implement an electrical approximation of a stability control equation by processing the signals of lower cost position gyros using a network of resistors, capacitors, and tube amplifiers. The resulting device offered better performance, lower weight, and 1/280 the cost compared to competing approaches.

Hölzer expanded upon the Mischgerät design to develop the first general purpose electronic analog computer, which he used to perform 2 DOF flight simulations with examples of the Mischgerät.

The name "Mischgerät" suggested a simple signal mixer, a cover for the true capability of the device.

The Mischgerät analog electronic computing approach became the base from which American and Soviet engineers built much more sophisticated and accurate rocket flight control systems into the 1960s.

== Development history ==
In 1935 while a student of the Technical University at Darmstadt, Germany, Helmut Hölzer was also a novice glider pilot, and wanted a way to measure his ground speed. He theorized that using electronic circuits, mathematical operations like integration or differentiation could be implemented. The system input would come via measuring voltage from a capacitor attached to a three-axis mass-spring damping system. He wanted to build it as an undergraduate project, but professors at the University talked him out of it.

He wasn't able to revisit this work until 1939 when a civilian draft pulled him from a position at Telefunken in Berlin to work at the German army rocket R&D site at Peenemünde under the technical direction of Wernher von Braun.

A gyroscopic course control was intended to stabilize the planned A4 (V-2) SRBM. Gyros couldn't account for crosswinds, and so a radio remote control was planned to address this. Hölzer was assigned to work on this task. Soon after, Dr. von Braun told the remote control lab staff that all four companies contracted to develop the gyroscopic control system said that their calculations showed that it would be unstable in flight.

The companies were using parts intended for aircraft and that some, particularly the servo motors that would move the rocket thrusters, were too slow. Unlike aircraft, the rocket had only 60 seconds of powered flight to correct course deviations. A solution would involve either faster servos or the addition of rate gyros. These changes required time and money not available to the A4 project.

Hölzer, Otto Mueller, and others in their lab told Von Braun that they could have a solution the next day. They expanded upon the design of the electronic simulators they developed to test the remote control system into a prototype automatic stabilization computer. Hölzer estimated that the cost would be only a few Reichsmarks per copy, rather than several thousand for new rate gyros. Subsequent bench testing validated this electronic control approach.

== Theory of Operation ==
The purpose of the Mischgerät was to provide stability control for the A4/V-2 missile that was superior to a gyroscope-only approach.

Unlike a projectile, missiles in the Aggregat series were held aerodynamically stable during their flight by fixed fins. Since the device could be forced off of its intended trajectory, it had to also be directed by additional active control elements.

On the A5 research missile, that was carried out by a three-axis gyroscopic control system installed internally on a rigid mount. A radio receiver could be added to improve accuracy with a signal from a radio guidance beam on the azimuth of the target mixed with the gyroscopic yaw signal.

The task of the missile control system was to force the device to follow its intended trajectory during powered flight and to avoid oscillation and roll. After motor burnout, the control system was switched off and the device followed a ballistic path.

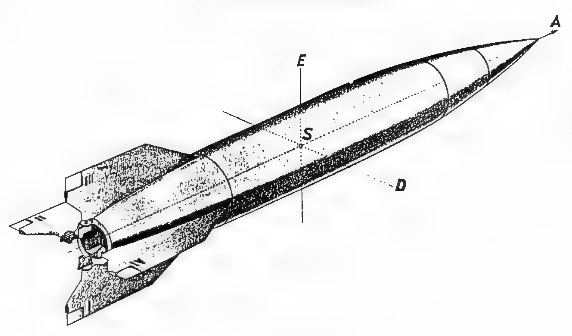
Labeling of the V-2 missile fins and axes of rotation

Every steering action on a missile caused rotation around the center of gravity. All possible rotations occurred around three mutually perpendicular axes. On the A4 these were named as follows:

- A - axis or roll axis is the longitudinal axis of the device.
- E - axis or yaw axis is the straight line running parallel to the axis of rudders I and III through the center of gravity.
- D - axis or pitch axis is the straight line running parallel to the rudder axis II and IV through the center of gravity. It is also perpendicular to A and E.

The task of the A4's control system was to prevent any unwanted rotation around the A (roll), E (yaw) and D (pitch) axes.

=== Active Stabilization Problem Using Aircraft Gyroscopes ===
If the command voltages of the pitch, yaw and roll gyroscopes corresponding to the angular position of the device were given directly to the steering servos as control currents, the following picture would result.

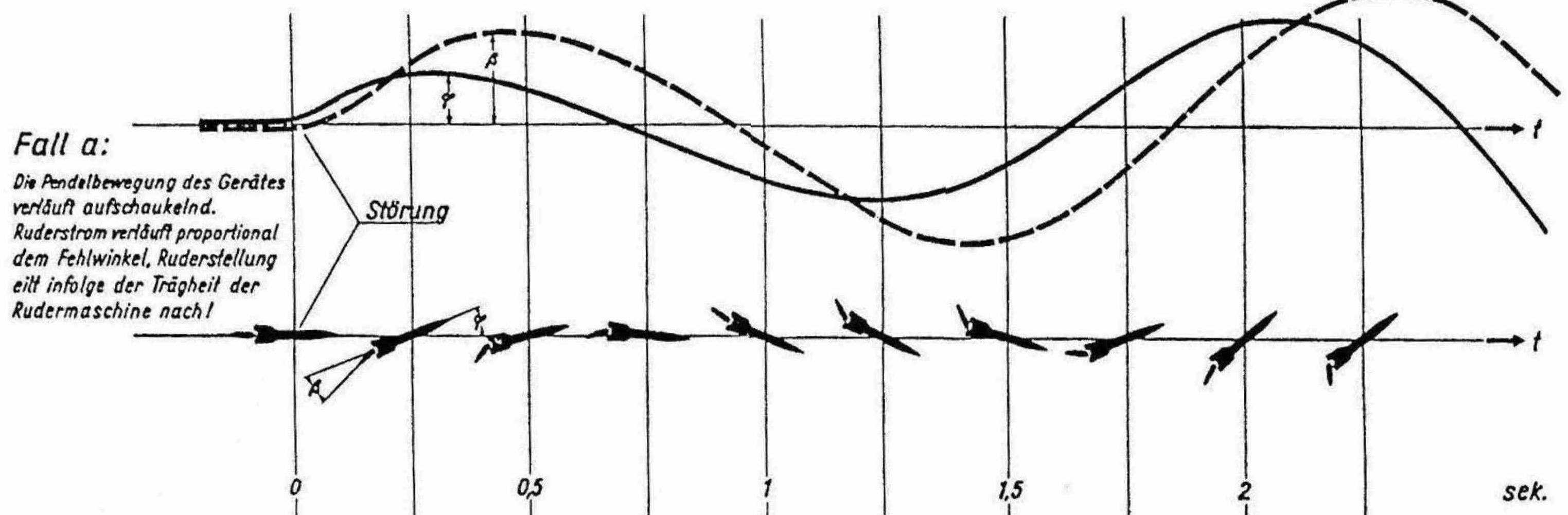
Case A: Increasing missile oscillation when using simple gyroscopic course correction.

For example, as long as the missile was yawing to the left, the steering servos would receive a proportional command voltage to swing the missile rightward. They would swing at a high angular rate in order to bring the missile back into the correct position via the control surface it was attached to (ie. a graphite vane or fin rudder). This moved the missile towards its original orientation.

However, during the time the missile was yawing left, the steering servos would continue to receive a turning command. The steering servos wouldn't be commanded to return to the zero position until the missile had already swung through the original orientation to the right. This caused the missile to overcorrect.

The gyros wouldn't send another correcting command voltage to the servos until the nose had quickly swung through its original orientation. This left and right overcorrection would lead to the missile deflection increasing with every change of direction, and the oscillation building up. A solution was required to ensure that the control surfaces returned to the zero position before the missile returned to its original orientation.

=== Active Stabilization Solution By Adding Electronic Damping ===
To ensure that the control surfaces return to the zero position before the missile overcorrects, the steering servos must receive a command to run back some time beforehand. Given that the oscillations are sinusoidal processes, the required lead of the controlling current to that of the physical oscillation is called a leading phase shift.

This leading control current is generated by sending the gyroscope's voltage through an electrical network of resistors and capacitors. An amplifier picks up the modified command current and sends it to the steering servo.

To determine the appropriate lead, the steering system must sense more than the yaw offset, but also include the angular velocity and acceleration of the missile turning away from its original orientation. Capacitors are used to measure this angular velocity.

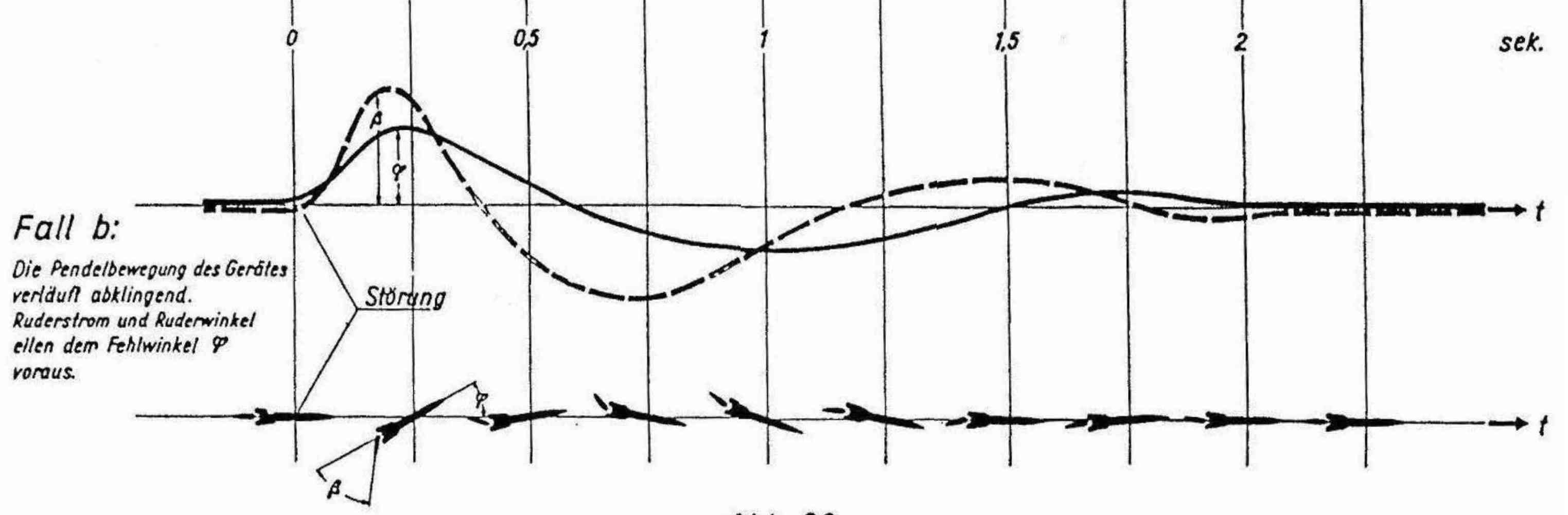
Case B: Decreasing missile oscillation when adding electronic damping.

If the gyroscope voltage for yaw changes continuously, this signals an angular velocity. In the Mischgerät, a capacitor circuit generates voltages corresponding to this angular velocity. These voltages are modified by an additional capacitor circuit to generate a voltage corresponding to angular acceleration. The two signals are used for damping any oscillations in the yaw commands.

This approach was replicated using three parallel control paths to simultaneously damp out oscillations in pitch, yaw, and roll.

== Technical details ==
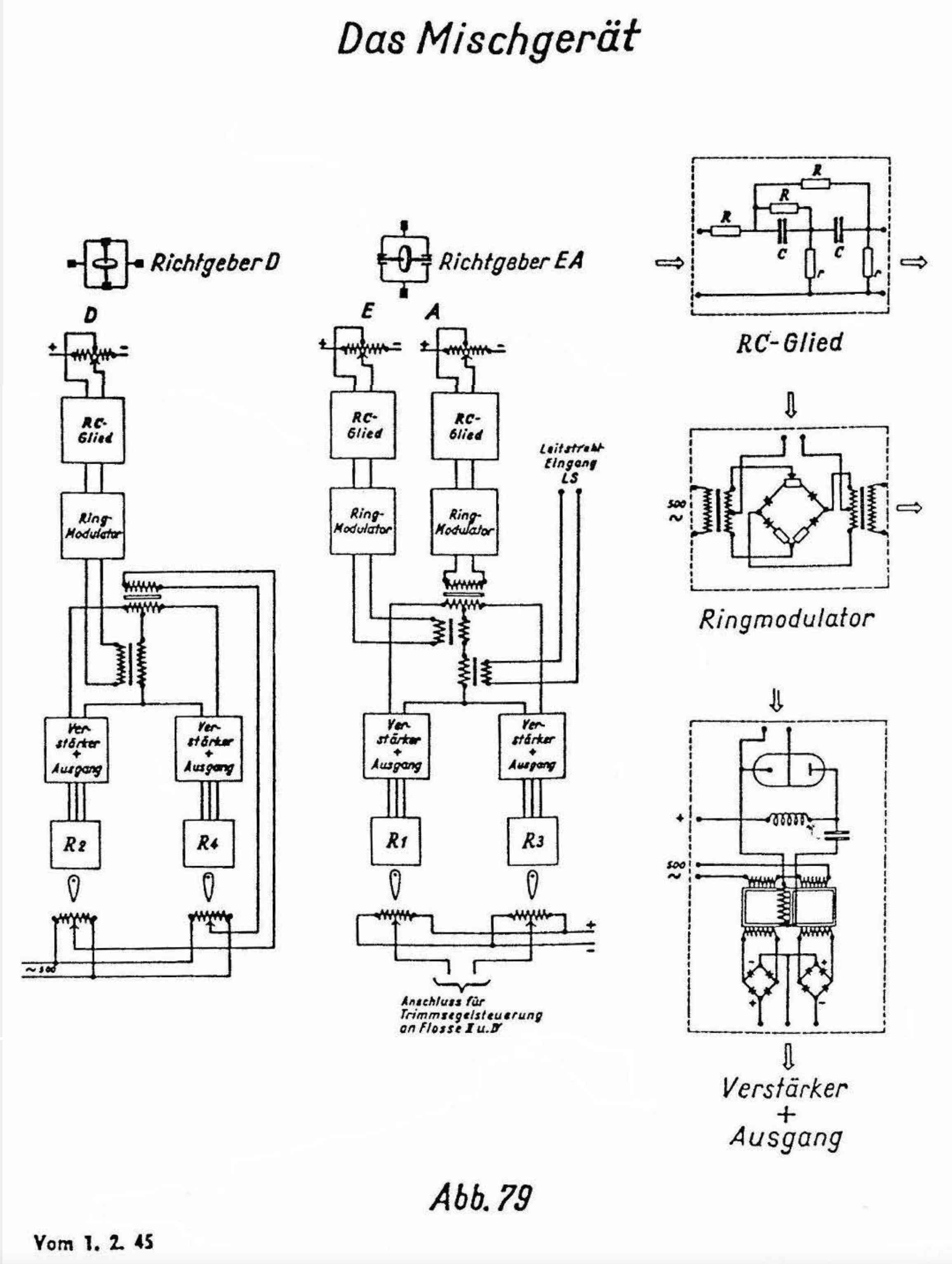
High level diagram of the V-2 missile control system

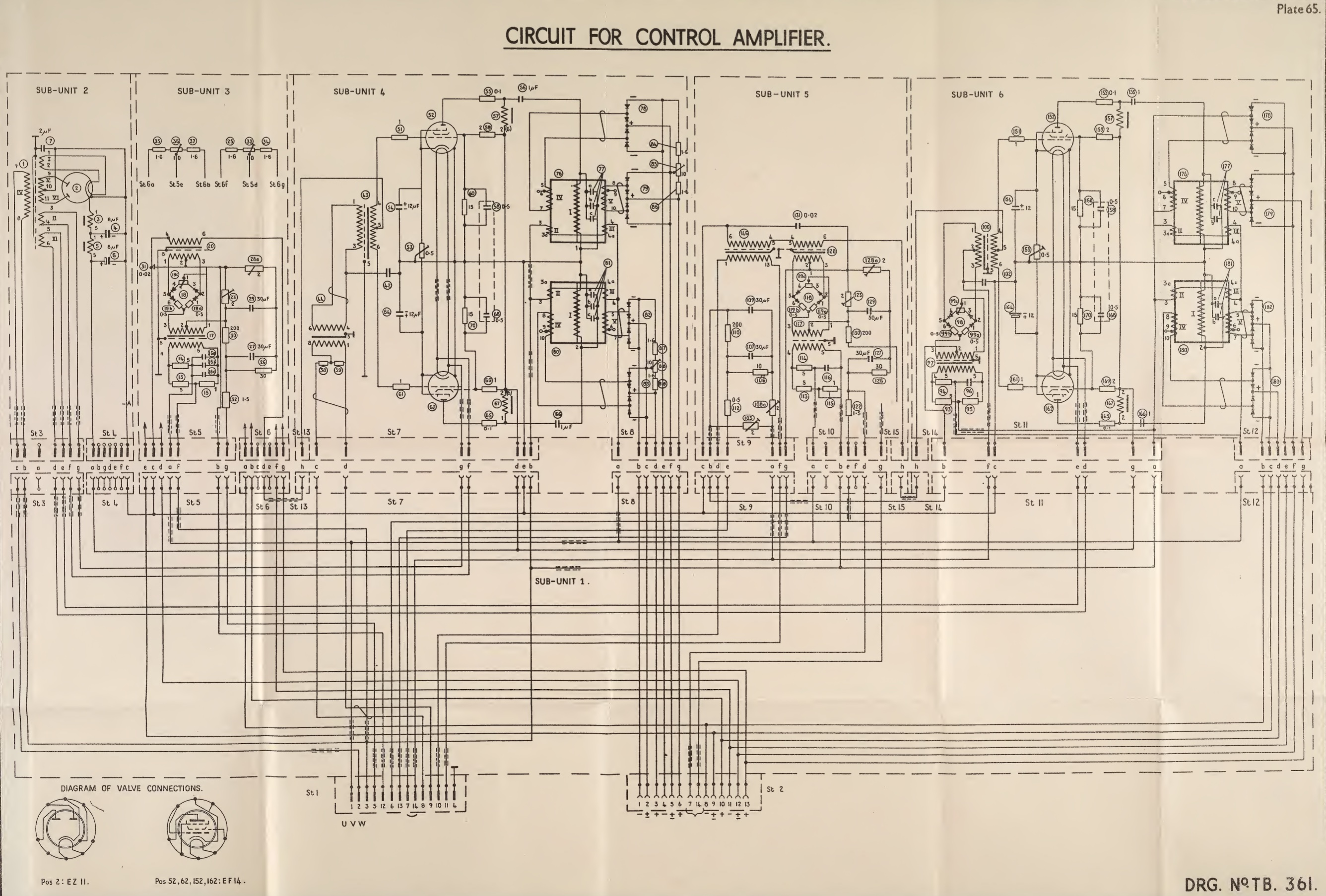
Mischgerät schematic diagram

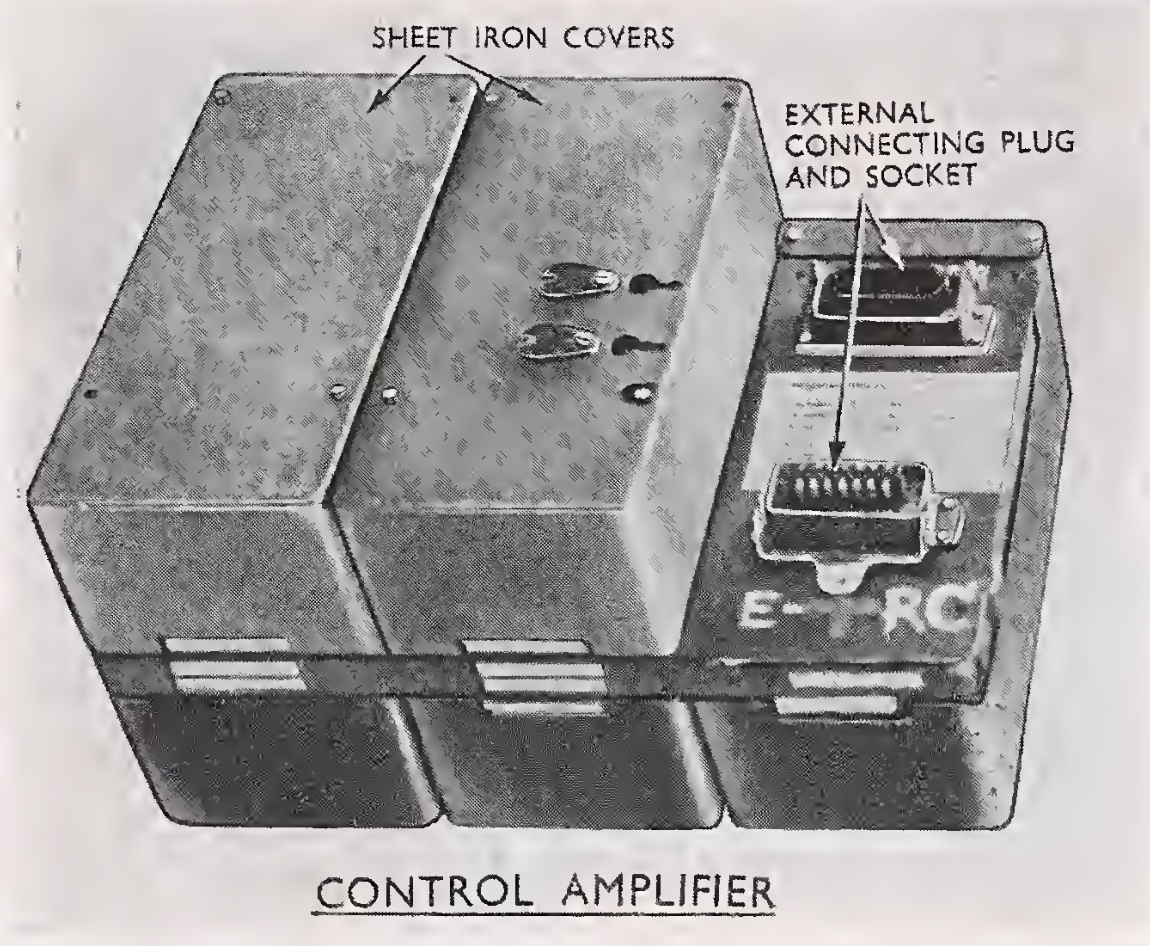
Mischgerät exterior top view

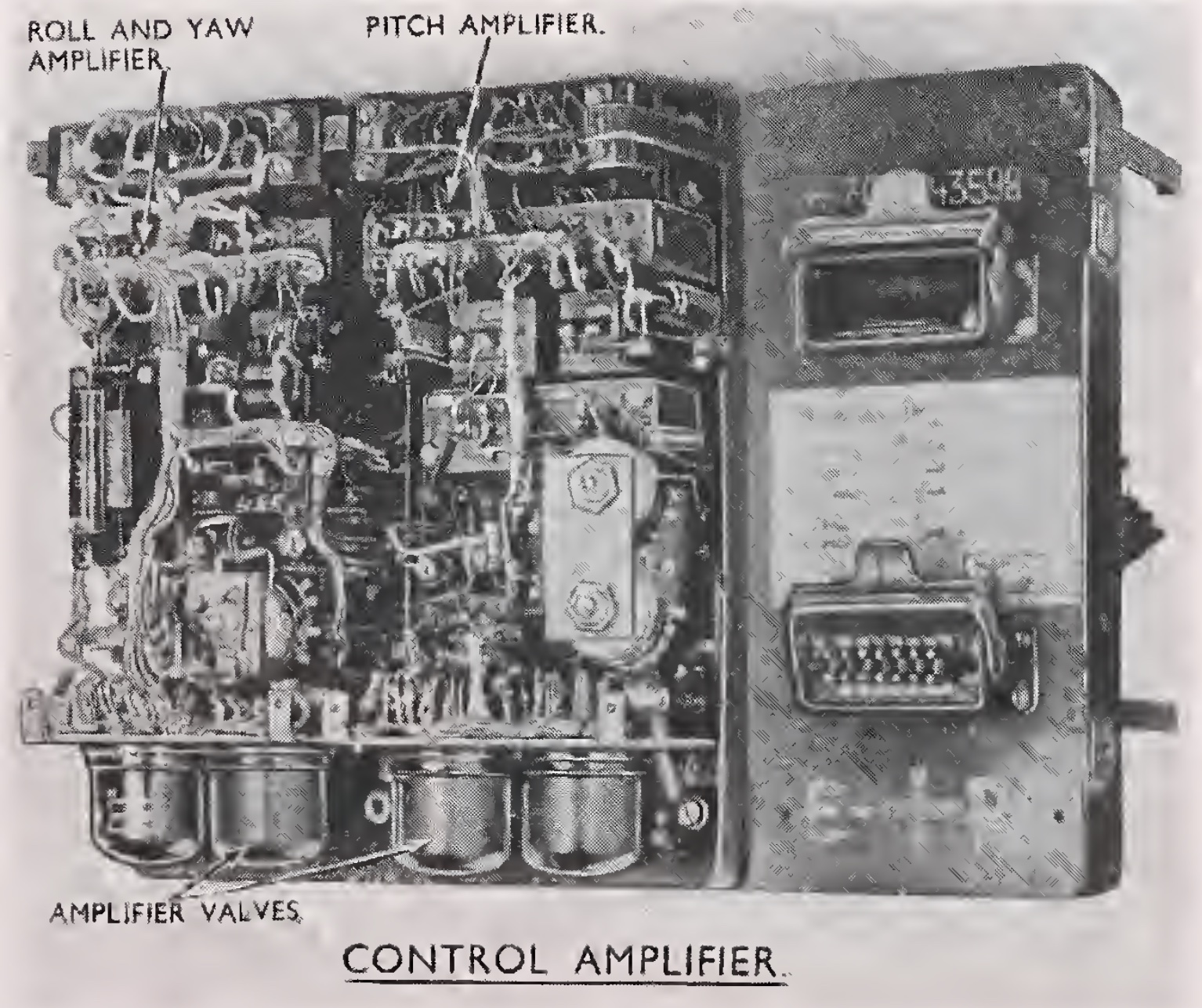
Mischgerät interior, showing sections 4 (left), 5 (center) and 1 (right).

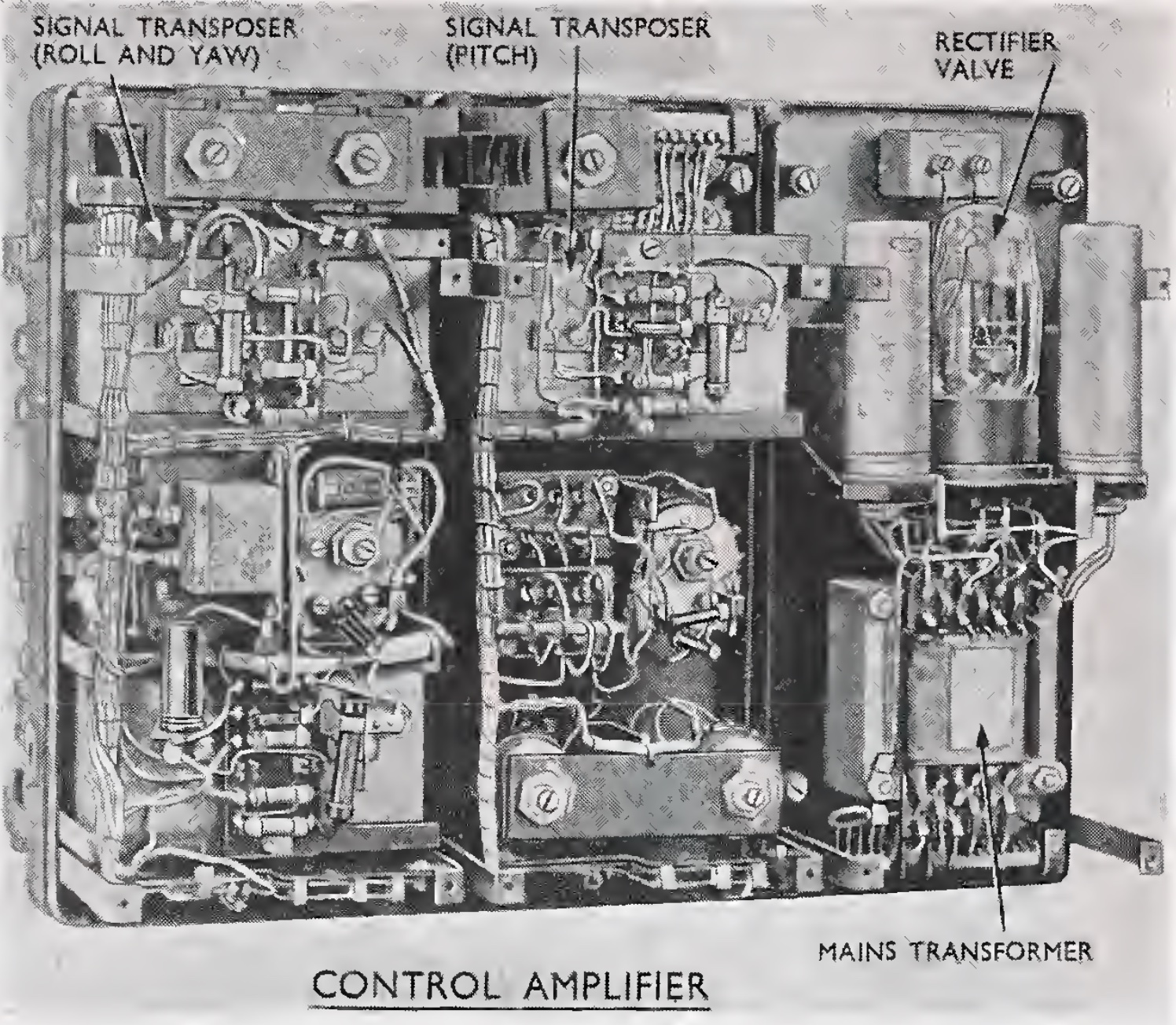
Mischgerät interior, showing sections 6 (left), 3 (center) and 2 (right).

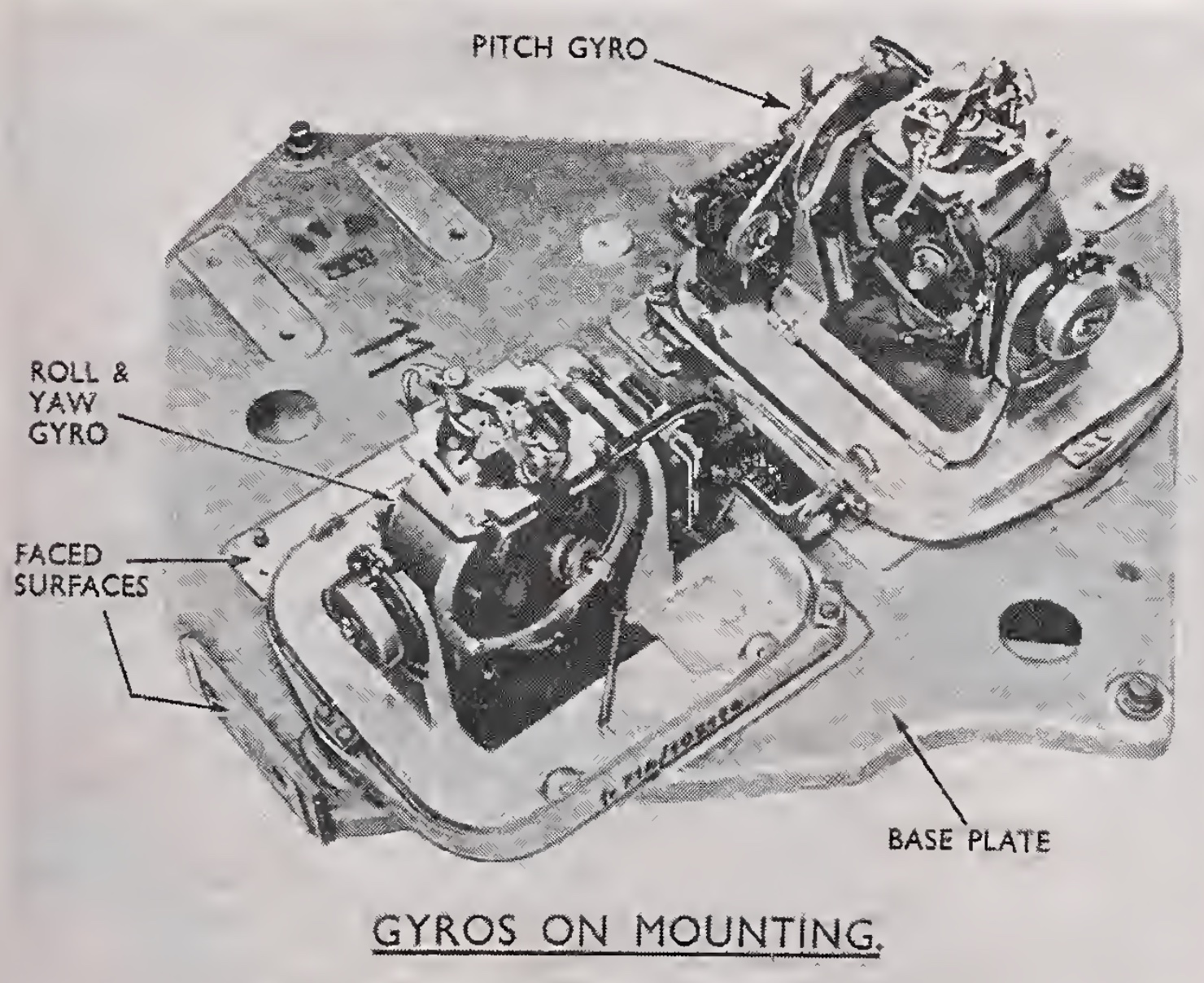
The Siemens LEV-3 pitch, roll, and yaw gyroscope assembly, providing the inertial inputs for the Mischgerät analog stability control computer.

== Production ==
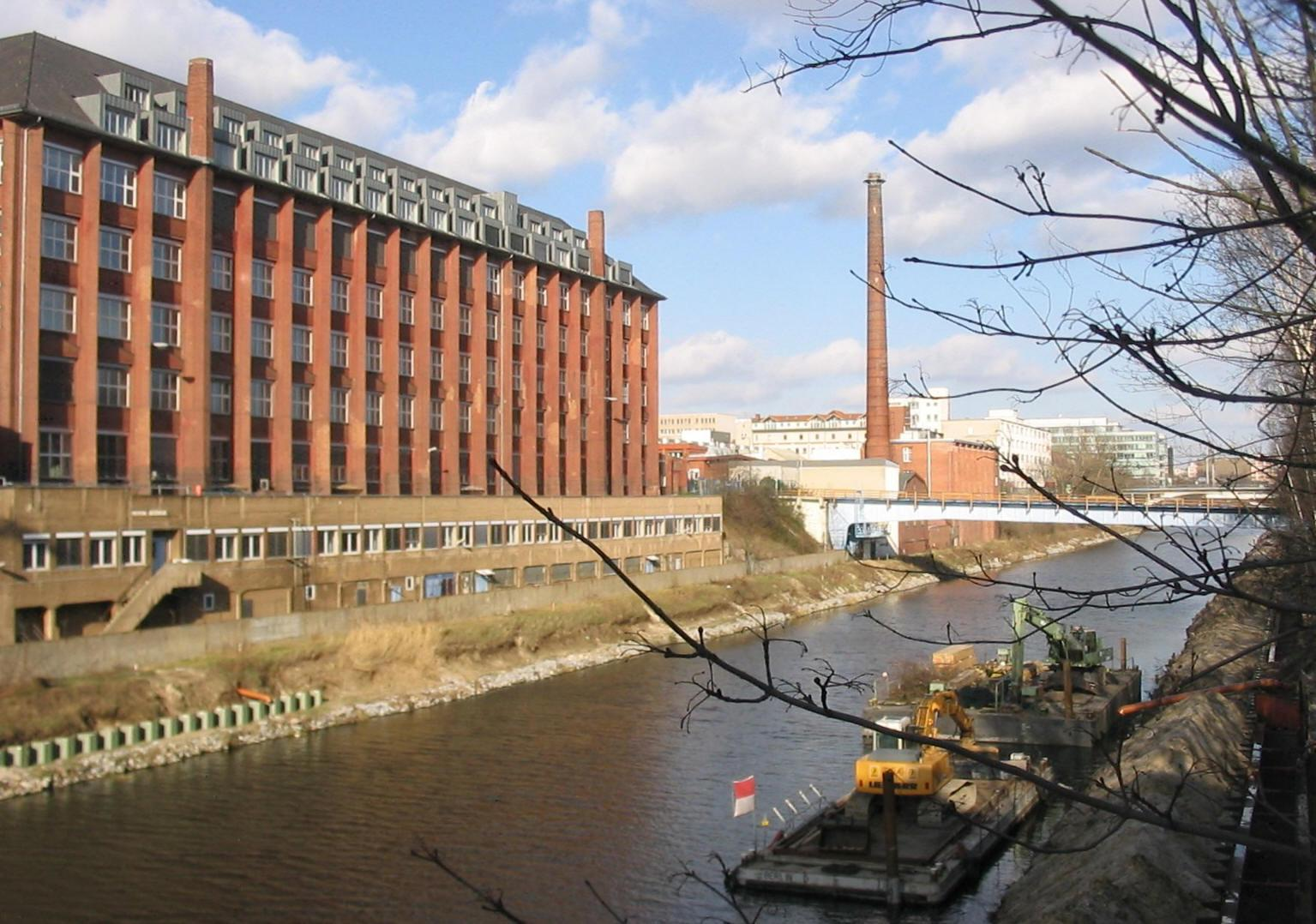
C. Lorenz Tempelhof-Berlin factory

The Mischgerät was produced at the C. Lorenz AG company’s Berlin-Tempelhof factory, and shipped to Peenemünde and later Mittelbau-Dora for integration with the V-2 missile.

During the Hermes program testing of captured V-2s in the US, prime contractor General Electric built 80 additional units using local components at their Schenectady, NY facility when the project ran out of German-made examples to equip otherwise completed missiles.

The Scientific-Research Institute No.885 built at least 300 units using local components to equip the first Soviet SRBM, the R-1, itself a local recreation of the V-2.

== Surviving examples ==
- Australian War Memorial
- Deutsches Technikmuseum Berlin
- White Sands Missile Range Museum, V-2 Building

== See also ==
- V-2 rocket
- Hermes program
- Operation Backfire (World War II)

== Citations ==
- Gerovitch, Slava. "Glossary of Institutions of the Soviet Space Program" (PDF). MIT. "see 'Scientific-Research Institute of Space Instrument Building (NII KP)'"
- "Final Report, Project Hermes V-2 Missile Program". Internet Archive. Schenectady, NY, US: General Electric Defense Product Group. 1952-09-01. pp. 126–128.
- Hoelzer, Helmut (1990). "50 Jahre Analog Computer" (PDF). Foundation for German communication and related technologies. NL.
- Tomayko, James (1985-09-01). "Helmut Hoelzer's Fully Electronic Analog Computer" (PDF). Nonstop Systems. USA: IEEE. Archived (PDF) from the original on 2025-02-12.
- "Das Gerät A4 Baureihe B Gerätbeschreibung" [The A4 Device Series B Device Description] (PDF). Internet Archive (in German). Translated by Holmberg, Carl. Berlin, Germany: Oberkommando des Heeres, Heereswaffenamt, Amtsgruppe für Entwicklung und Prüfung (Army High Command, Army Weapons Office, Office Group for Development and Testing). 1945-02-01. p. 173.
- "Das Gerät A4 Baureihe B Gerätbeschreibung" [The A4 Device Series B Device Description] (PDF). Internet Archive (in German). Translated by Holmberg, Carl. Berlin, Germany: Oberkommando des Heeres, Heereswaffenamt, Amtsgruppe für Entwicklung und Prüfung (Army High Command, Army Weapons Office, Office Group for Development and Testing). 1945-02-01. pp. 181–182.
- Zaloga, Steven (2003-08-20). V-2 Ballistic Missile 1942–52. Bloomsbury, USA: Osprey. p. 41. ISBN 9781841765419. "R-1 and R-2 missile production: 51: 76, 52: 237, 53: 544"
- Zaloga, Steven [@ZalogaSteven] (January 6, 2025). "The figures in my book come from: N. Ya. Lysukhin, 'RVSN v sisteme natsionalnoy bezopastnosti Rossii: Istoriko-politologicheskiy analiz', (Moscow: 1997). More recent accounts give no production figures. R-2 production began in June 1953, but I don't have an end date for R-1" (Tweet) – via X (formerly Twitter).
- Ulmann, Bernd (2008). "Von der Raketensteuerung zum Analogrechner Helmut Hoelzers Peenemünder Arbeiten und ihr Erbe" ["From rocket control to analog computers: Helmut Hoelzer's Peenemünde works and their legacy"] (PDF) (in German). Kolloquium zur Geschichte der Naturwissenschaften, Mathematik und Technik Universität Hamburg.
