= Roquetoire =

Roquetoire Rokesdorn
- Commune
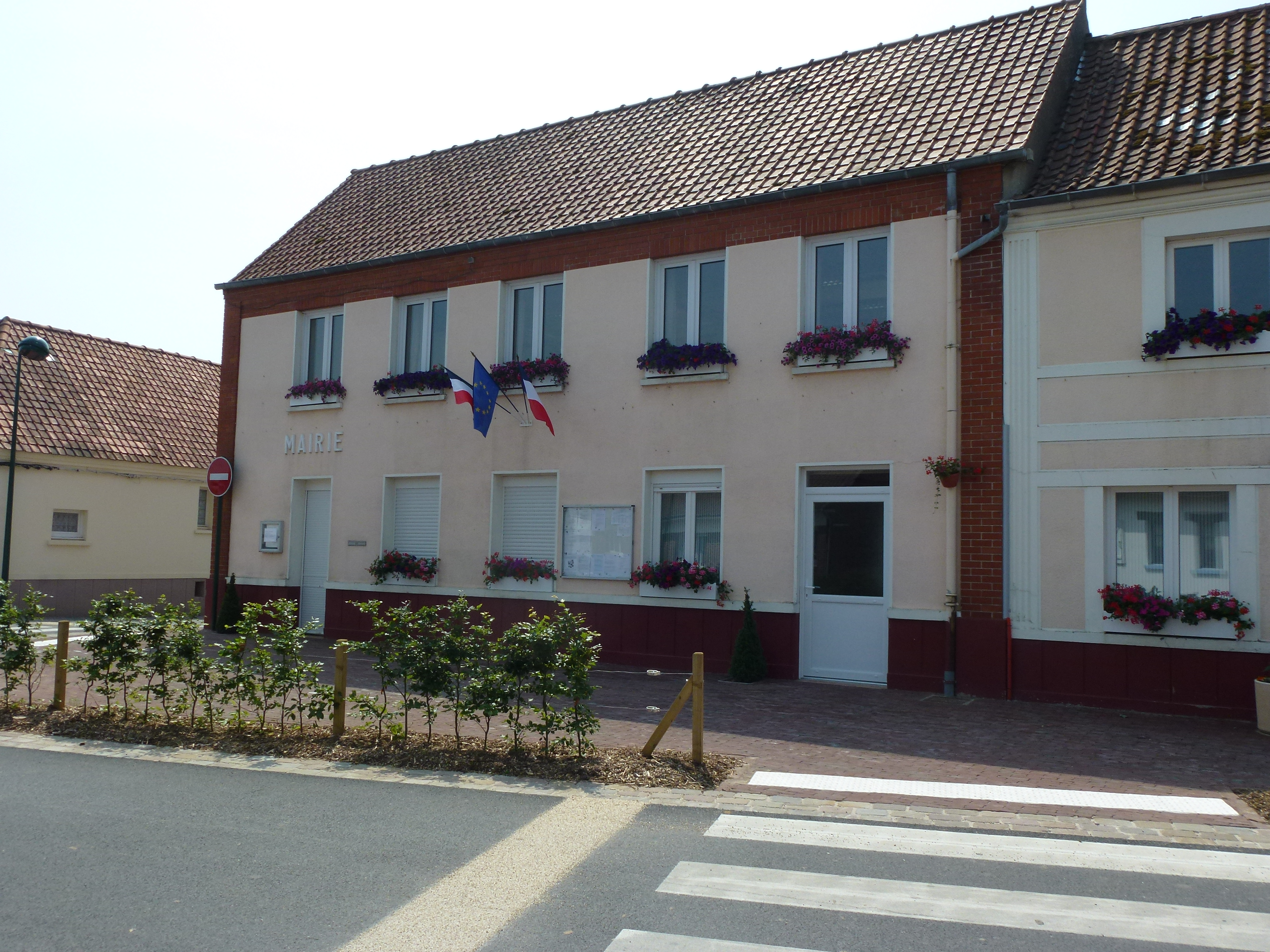
- The town hall of Roquetoire

- Coat of arms
- Location of Roquetoire
- Location within France Location within Hauts-de-France
- Coordinates: 50°40′16″N 2°20′35″E
- Country: France
- Region: Hauts-de-France
- Department: Pas-de-Calais
- Arrondissement: Saint-Omer
- Canton: Aire-sur-la-Lys
- Intercommunality: CA Pays de Saint-Omer

Government
  - Mayor (2020–2026): Véronique Boidin
- Area^{1}: 10.71 km^{2} (4.14 sq mi)
- Elevation: 40 m (130 ft)
- Highest elevation: 71 m (233 ft)
- Lowest elevation: 22 m (72 ft)
- Population (2023): 1,970
  - Density: 184/km^{2} (476/sq mi)
- Time zone: UTC+01:00 (CET)
  - Summer (DST): UTC+02:00 (CEST)
- INSEE/Postal code: 62721 /62120
- Website: www.roquetoire.fr
- ^{1} French Land Register data, which excludes lakes, ponds, glaciers > 1 km^{2} (0.386 sq mi or 247 acres) and river estuaries.

Roquetoire (French pronunciation: [ʁɔktwaʁ]; West Flemish: Rokesdorn) is a commune in the Pas-de-Calais department in the Hauts-de-France region of France about 7 miles (12 km) southeast of Saint-Omer.

== Population ==
Historical population
Year	Pop.	±% p.a.
1968	1,078	—
1975	1,148	+0.90%
1982	1,351	+2.35%
1990	1,571	+1.90%
1999	1,621	+0.35%
2007	1,739	+0.88%
2012	1,895	+1.73%
2017	1,944	+0.51%
2023	1,970	+0.22%
Source: INSEE

== See also ==
- Communes of the Pas-de-Calais department
