= HMS P36 =

Two ships of the Royal Navy have been named HMS P36.

- HMS P36 (1916), a P-class patrol boat launched in 1916 and sold in 1923.
- HMS P36 (1941), a U-class submarine launched in April 1941 and sunk in Sliema Harbour, Malta on 1 April 1942 by a German aircraft. The wreck was raised in August 1958 and scrapped.
