= Prédefin =

- Commune
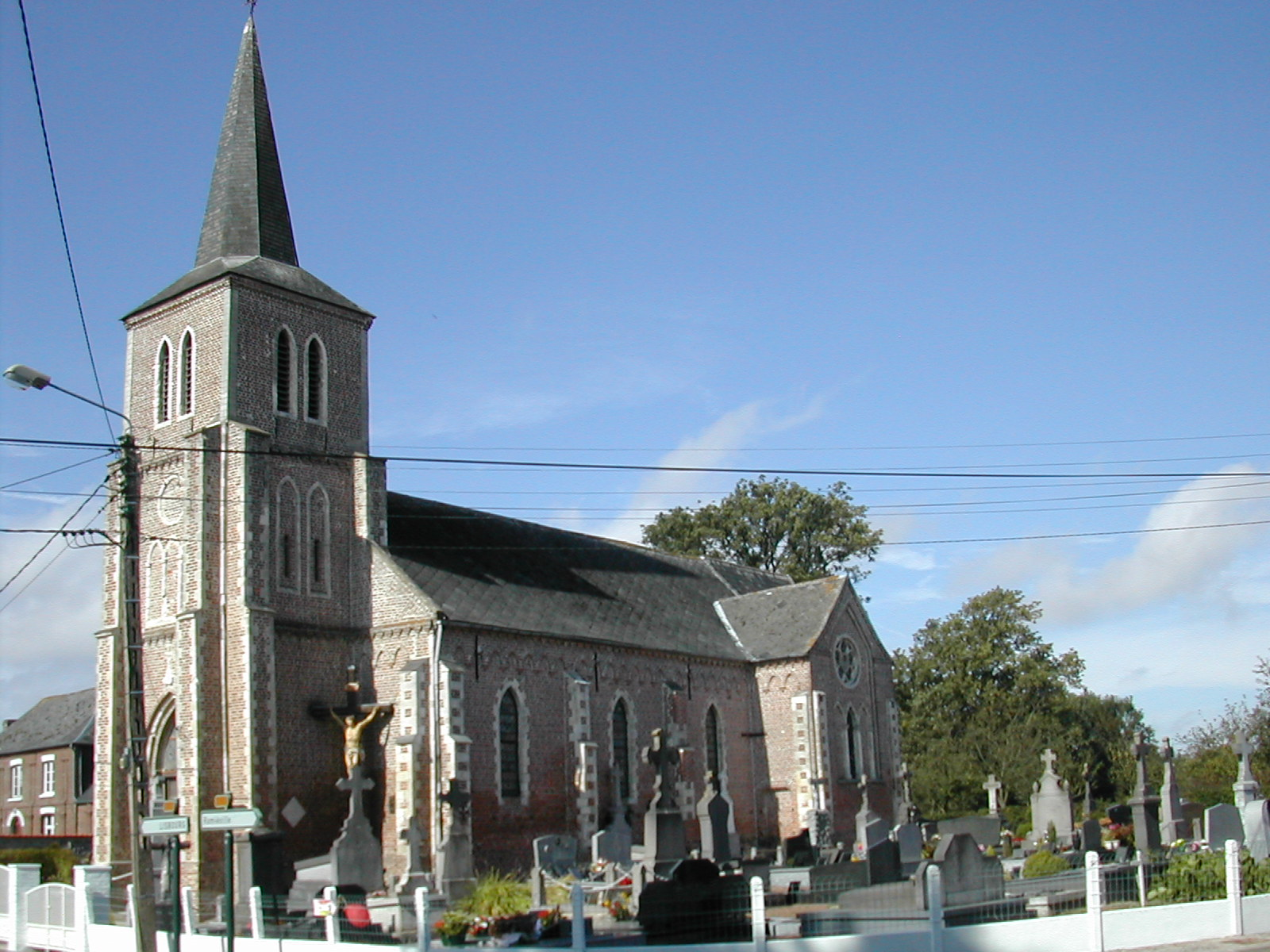
- The church of Prédefin

- Coat of arms
- Location of Prédefin
- Location within France Location within Hauts-de-France
- Coordinates: 50°30′14″N 2°15′21″E
- Country: France
- Region: Hauts-de-France
- Department: Pas-de-Calais
- Arrondissement: Arras
- Canton: Saint-Pol-sur-Ternoise
- Intercommunality: CC Ternois

Government
  - Mayor (2020–2026): Jean-Michel Briois
- Area^{1}: 3.82 km^{2} (1.47 sq mi)
- Elevation: 171 m (561 ft)
- Highest elevation: 178 m (584 ft)
- Lowest elevation: 135 m (443 ft)
- Population (2023): 227
  - Density: 59.4/km^{2} (154/sq mi)
- Time zone: UTC+01:00 (CET)
  - Summer (DST): UTC+02:00 (CEST)
- INSEE/Postal code: 62668 /62134
- ^{1} French Land Register data, which excludes lakes, ponds, glaciers > 1 km^{2} (0.386 sq mi or 247 acres) and river estuaries.

Prédefin (French pronunciation: [pʁedfɛ̃]; Picard: Prudefin) is a commune in the Pas-de-Calais department in the Hauts-de-France region of France.

== Geography ==
Prédefin is situated 34 miles (55 km) northwest of Arras, on the D93 road.

== Population ==
Historical population
Year	Pop.	±% p.a.
1968	270	—
1975	227	−2.45%
1982	205	−1.45%
1990	194	−0.69%
1999	186	−0.47%
2007	189	+0.20%
2012	210	+2.13%
2017	190	−1.98%
2023	227	+3.01%
Source: INSEE

== Places of interest ==
- The church of St. Martin, built in the 19th century.

== See also ==
- Communes of the Pas-de-Calais department
