= Mammut radar =

German radar

Mammut
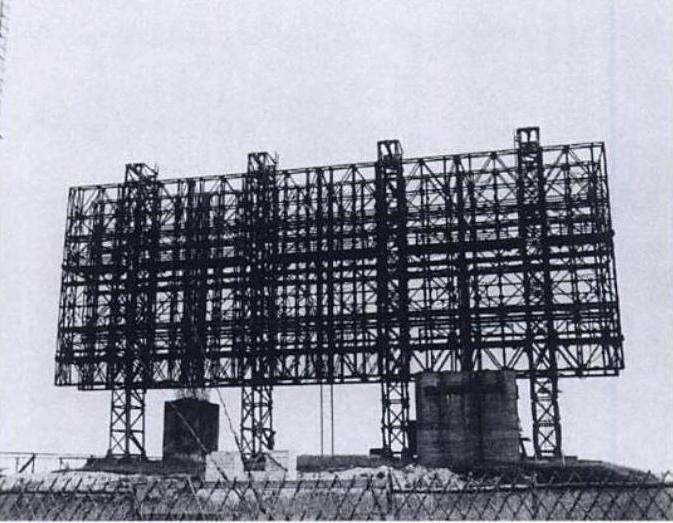
- Mammut radar antenna
- Country of origin: Germany
- Introduced: 1944?
- Type: Phased array, long-range Early warning radar
- Frequency: 120–150 MHz
- Range: 300 km (190 mi)
- Azimuth: 2× 100°
- Precision: ±0.5°
- Power: 200 kW
- Other names: FuMG 41/42

The FuMG 41/42 Mammut was a long-range, phased array, early warning radar built by Germany in the latter days of World War II. Developed by the GEMA company, it consisted of six or eight Freya antenna arrays, switched together and coupled to two Freya devices. The arrays were fixed and the beam could be electronically steered on a 100° arc in front and behind the antenna, leaving 80° blind arcs on each side. It was the world's first phased array radar and was able to detect targets flying at an altitude of 8,000 m (26,000 ft) at a range of 300 km (190 mi).

The British intelligence code name, "hoarding", was probably related to the shape of the large array. As late in the war as April 20, 1945, intelligence reports reflected the erroneous opinion that only development prototypes existed but no operational stations had been fielded.

== Technical specifications ==
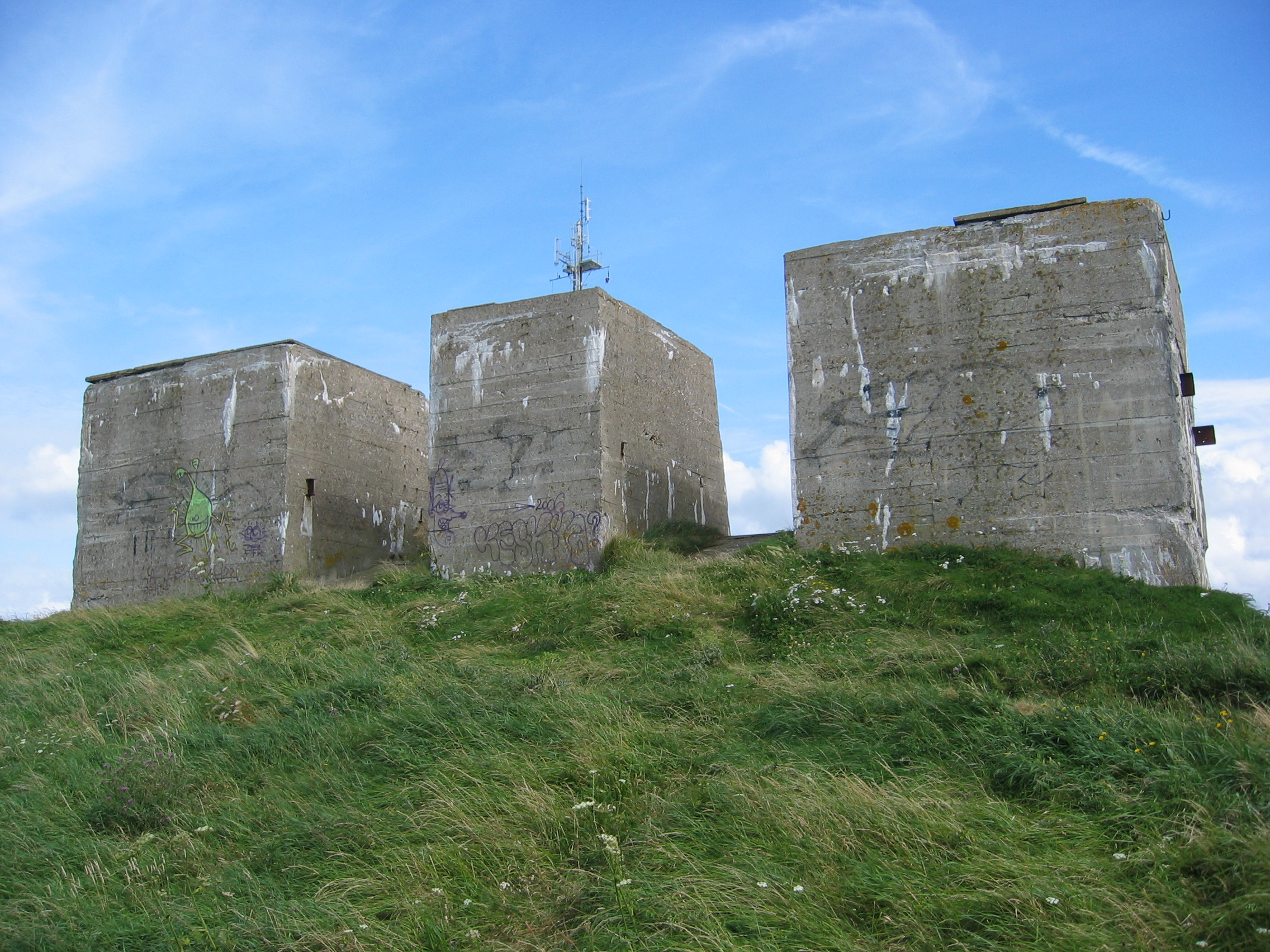
Concrete emplacement built at Cap Fagnet, Fécamp, Normandy, where the Mammut was never erected

| -/- | FuMG-416 |
| Frequency range | 116–146 MHz |
| Pulse power | 20 kW |
| Pulse width | 2–3.5 μs |
| Swivel angle | — |
| Beam width | 0.5° |
| Resolution | 300 m |
| Power supply | Mains and emergency generator |
| Antenna size | 30 × 16 m (air force), 20 × 14 m (navy) |
| Weight | unknown |
| Tubes | similar to Freya |
| Range | 325 km (202 mi) |
