= Helmut Hölzer =

German-American rocket engineer (1912–1996)

Helmut Hoelzer
- Helmut Hölzer
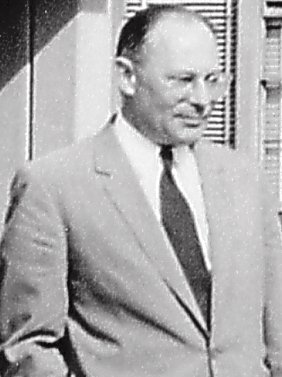
- Helmut Hoelzer in Huntsville, Alabama
- Born: February 27, 1912; Bad Liebenstein, Thüringen, German Empire
- Died: October 12, 1996 (aged 84); Huntsville, Alabama, United States
- Education: Technische Hochschule Darmstadt
- Known for: Designing an electronic stabilization computer and related test simulator for the V-2 rocket control system.
- Awards: Paul Ehrlich and Ludwig Darmstaedter Prize (1963)
- Scientific career
- Fields: Electrical Engineering, Applied mathematics
- Workplaces: 1933-tbd: teaching 1939: Telefunken (Berlin); 1939-1945: Peenemünde; 1940s-1950s: Fort Bliss/WSPG; 1950s-1950s: Redstone Arsenal; 1950s-1960s: ABMA 1960-1970s: Marshall Space Flight Center (Director, Computation Division)

Helmut Hoelzer was a German-American V-2 rocket engineer who was brought to the United States under Operation Paperclip. Hoelzer was the inventor and constructor of the world's first electronic analog computer.

== Life ==
In October 1939, while working for the Telefunken electronics firm in Berlin, Hoelzer met with Ernst Steinhoff, Hermann Steuding, and Wernher von Braun regarding guide beams for a flying body. (Note: p. 107) In late 1940 at Peenemünde, Hoelzer was head of the guide beam division (Note: p. 140) (assistant Henry Otto Hirschler), which developed a guide-plane system which alternates a transmitted signal from two antennas a short distance apart, as well as a vacuum tube mixing device (German: Mischgerät) which corrected for momentum that would perturb an object that had been moved back on-track. (Note: p. 104) By the fall of 1941, Hoelzer's "mixing device" was used to provide V-2 rocket rate measurement instead of rate gyros. (Note: p. 106)

Then at the beginning of 1942, Hoelzer built an analog computer to calculate and simulate V-2 rocket trajectories (Note: p. 106) Hoelzer's team also developed the Messina telemetry system. After evacuating Peenemünde for the Alpenfestung (Alpine Fortress), Hoelzer returned to Peenemünde via motorcycle to look for portions of his PhD dissertation prior to surrendering to United States forces at the end of World War II.

Hoelzer was a student of Alwin Walther.

== Family ==
One of his grandchildren is Olympic swimmer Margaret Hoelzer.

== Sources ==
- Neufeld, Michael J (1995). The Rocket and the Reich: Peenemünde and the Coming of the Ballistic Missile Era. New York: The Free Press. pp. 104, 106, 107, 140.
