= Launch pad (disambiguation) =

A launch pad or launchpad is an above-ground platform from which rocket- missiles or space launch vehicles take off vertically.

Launch pad may also refer to:

== Computing ==
- Launchpad (macOS), an application launcher introduced in Mac OS X Lion
- Launch Pad (software), an alternative to the Macintosh desktop developed by Berkeley Systems
- Launchpad (website), used for bug tracking and software development mainly used as part of the Ubuntu operating system
- LaunchPad, Clearspring tool that enables web content to be turned into distributable widgets
- Launchpad, U3 software application for USB flash drives
- Launchpad, a hardware controller for the Ableton Live music sequencer software
- Launchpad, a family of hardware development kits for embedded development from Texas Instruments

== Other ==
- Atlanta–Fulton County Stadium, nicknamed The Launching Pad, former stadium used by the Atlanta Braves
- Launch Pad (card game), a game about building rockets and preparing them for launch
- Launch Pad (Blackpool Pleasure Beach), an amusement ride in Blackpool, England
- Launchpad (series), a collection of short films produced by Walt Disney Pictures
- Launchpad McQuack, a Disney character
- Launchpad Records, a record label
- Launchpad, a charity for the homeless based in Reading, UK, co-founded by David Shaw
- Novation Launchpad, a keyboard-less MIDI controller

== See also ==
- Launch facility
- Launch complex
- Launch Complex (disambiguation)
- Launch (disambiguation)
- Pad (disambiguation)
