= Roll program =

Aerodynamic maneuver

A roll program or tilt maneuver is an aerodynamic maneuver that alters the attitude of a vertically launched space launch vehicle. It consists of a partial rotation around the vehicle's vertical axis, allowing the vehicle to then pitch to follow the proper azimuth toward orbit.

A roll program is usually completed after the vehicle clears the tower. In the case of many NASA crewed launches, the commander reports the roll to the mission control center which is then acknowledged by the capsule communicator.

== Saturn V ==
The Saturn V's roll program was initiated shortly after launch and was handled by the first stage. It was open-loop: the commands were pre-programmed to occur at a specific time after lift-off, and no closed loop control was used. This made the program simpler to design at the expense of not being able to correct for unforeseen conditions such as high winds. The rocket simply initiated its roll program at the appropriate time after launch, and rolled until an adequate amount of time had passed to ensure that the desired roll angle was achieved.

Roll on the Saturn V was initiated by tilting the engines simultaneously using the roll and pitch servomechanisms, which served to initiate a rolling torque on the vehicle.

== Space Shuttle ==
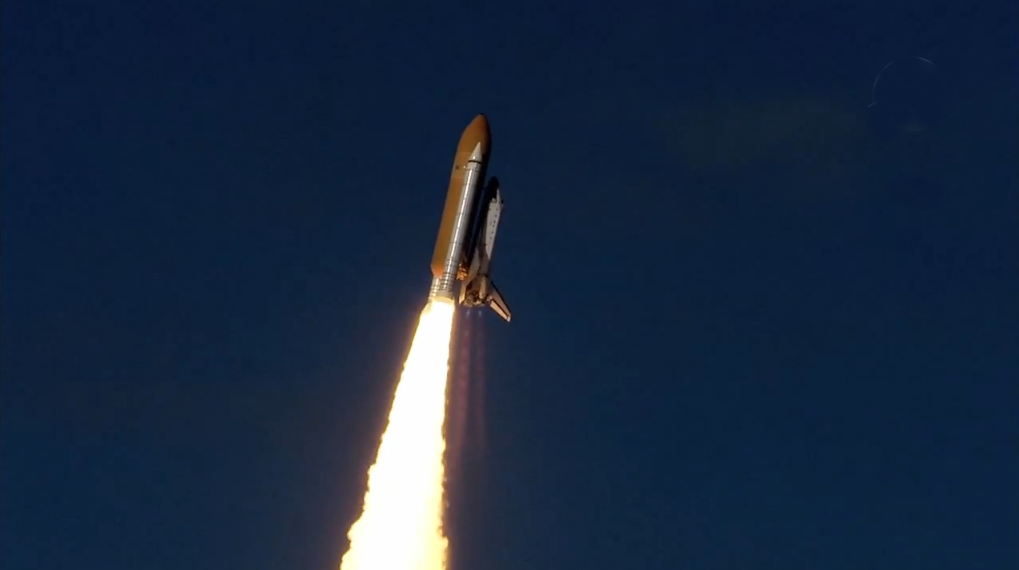
Space Shuttle Atlantis performs the roll maneuver shortly after launching from Kennedy Space Center on STS-129.

During the launch of a Space Shuttle, the roll program was simultaneously accompanied by a pitch maneuver and yaw maneuver.

The roll program occurred during a Shuttle launch for the following reasons:

- To place the shuttle in a heads down position
- Increasing the mass that can be carried into orbit (this was actually the initial reason - a 20% payload increase due to more efficient aerodynamics and moment balancing between the boosters and main engines)
- Increasing the orbital altitude
- Simplifying the trajectory of a possible Return to Launch site abort maneuver
- Improving radio line-of-sight propagation
- Orienting the shuttle more parallel toward the ground with the nose to the east

The RAGMOP computer program (Northrop) in 1971–72 discovered a ~20% payload increase by rolling upside down. It went from ~40,000 lb to ~48,000 lb to a 150 NM equatorial orbit without violating any constraints (max Q, 3 G limit, etc.). So the incentive to roll was initially for the payload increase by minimizing drag losses and moment balancing losses by keeping the main engine thrust vectors more parallel to the SRBs.
