= Ping-Pong (rocket) =

- Type: Reconnaissance missile
- Place of origin: United States

Service history
- Used by: United States Army

Production history
- Designer: Lockheed Missiles and Space Company
- Designed: 1964

Specifications
- Warhead: Cameras
- Engine: Rocket
- Propellant: Solid fuel
- Guidance system: Ballistic

Ping-Pong was a battlefield reconnaissance rocket developed by Lockheed-California – later the Lockheed Missiles and Space Company – for use by the United States Army. Intended to give battlefield commanders the ability to gain photographic data on enemy locations, it reached the flight-test stage before being cancelled.

== Development history ==
In 1964, the United States Army called for proposals for a rocket that could be launched by Army units towards the suspected location of enemy units, with a camera carried on board the rocket taking pictures of the target area, before a second retrorocket motor, located in the nose of the rocket, fired to return it to its point of launch for analysis of its reconnaissance pictures. Proposals were received from Lockheed-California, Goodyear Aerospace, the Chrysler Corporation Missile Division, and Beech Aircraft; the Lockheed proposal, named "Ping-Pong", was funded for development.

Ping-Pong was conventional in appearance, launched from a tube 4 inches (100 mm) in diameter. A cruciform fin arrangement provided stabilization; the fins were mounted on a sliding assembly, allowing them to shift to the opposite end of the rocket's body when the retrorocket was fired to reverse the rocket's direction for the return flight.

Flight testing of Ping-Pong took place at Rosamond Dry Lake in California during the second half of 1964. The tests were considered to be successful, with the rocket being reported as "the free world's only round-trip ballistic missile"; however, follow-up studies did not result in further development.
