= V-2 rocket =

German long-range ballistic missile

V-2
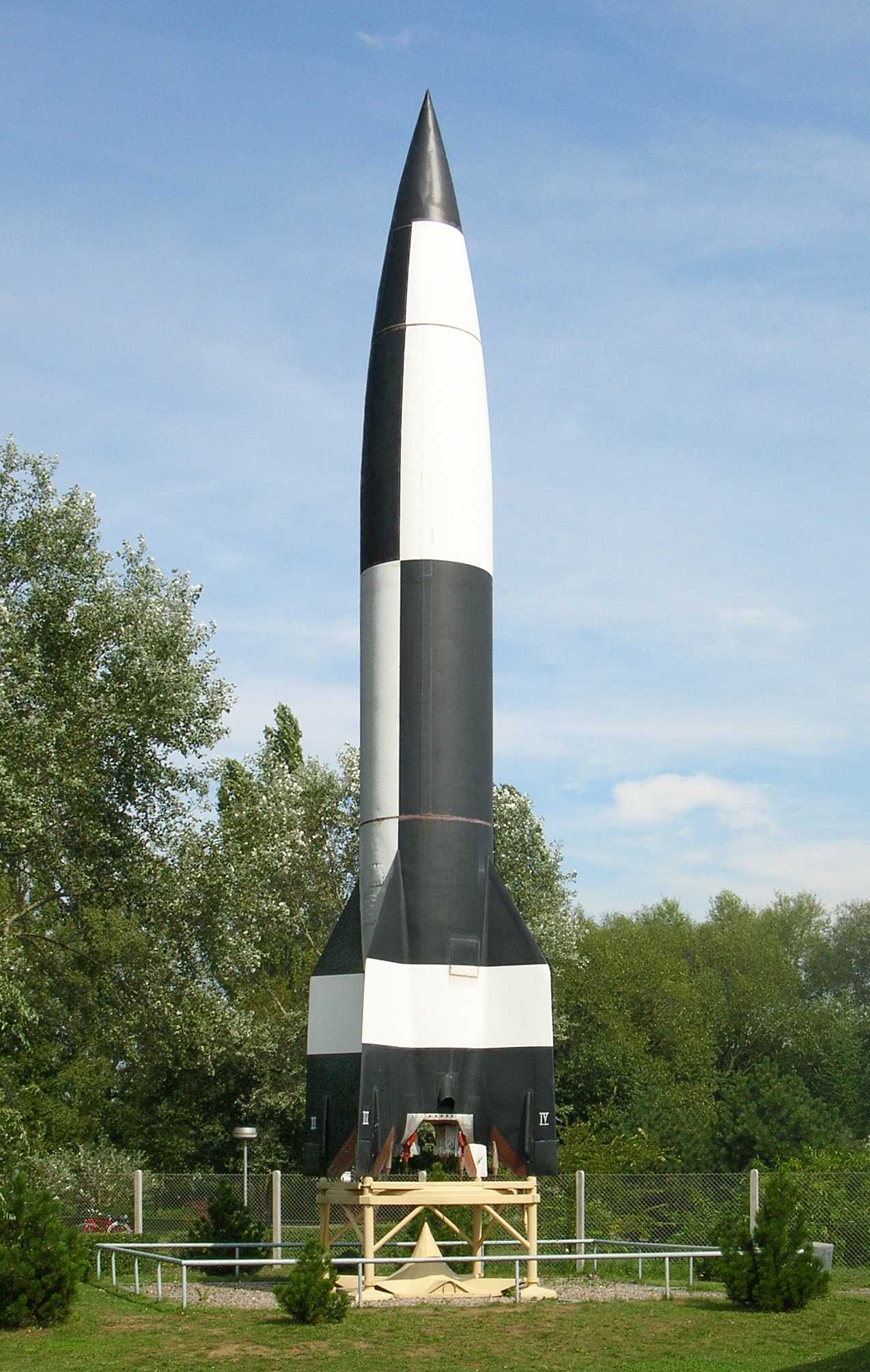
- Peenemünde Museum replica of V-2
- Type: Single-stage ballistic missile
- Place of origin: Nazi Germany

Service history
- In service: 1944–1952
- Used by: Wehrmacht; SS; Post-war: United Kingdom; United States; Soviet Union

Production history
- Designer: Peenemünde Army Research Center
- Manufacturer: Mittelwerk GmbH
- Unit cost: January 1944: 100,000 RM; March 1945: 50,000 RM
- Produced: 16 March 1942 – 1945 (Nazi); Some assembled post-war
- No. built: Approx 6,000, including test models

Specifications
- Mass: 12,500 kg (27,600 lb)
- Length: 14 m (45 ft 11 in)
- Diameter: 1.65 m (5 ft 5 in)
- Wingspan: 3.56 m (11 ft 8 in)
- Warhead: 1,000 kg (2,200 lb); Amatol (explosive weight: 910 kg)
- Detonation mechanism: Impact
- Propellant: 3,810 kg (8,400 lb) 75% Ethanol; 25% water; 4,910 kg (10,820 lb) liquid oxygen
- Operational range: 320 km (200 mi)
- Flight altitude: 88 km (55 mi) maximum altitude on long-range trajectory; 206 km (128 mi) maximum altitude if launched vertically
- Maximum speed: Maximum: 5,760 km/h (3,580 mph); At impact: 2,880 km/h (1,790 mph)
- Guidance system: Gyroscopes to determine direction; Electronic course correction autopilot; Müller-type pendulous gyroscopic accelerometer for engine cutoff on most production rockets
- Launch platform: Mobile (Meillerwagen)

The V-2 rocket (German: Vergeltungswaffe 2, lit. 'Vengeance Weapon 2'), with the development name Aggregat-4 (A4), was the world's first practical, modern ballistic missile and suborbital launch vehicle. The missile, powered by a liquid-propellant rocket engine, was developed during the Second World War in Nazi Germany as a "vengeance weapon" and assigned to attack Allied cities as retaliation for the Allied bombings of German cities. After an altitude of 100 km was selected to define the edge of space, the V-2 rocket also became retroactively the first artificial object to travel into space with the vertical launch of MW 18014 on 20 June 1944.

Research of military use of long-range rockets began when the graduate studies of Wernher von Braun were noticed by the Wehrmacht. A series of prototypes culminated in the A4, which went to war as the V-2. Beginning in September 1944, more than 3,000 V-2s were launched by the Wehrmacht against Allied targets, first London and later Antwerp and Liège. According to a 2011 BBC documentary, the attacks from V-2s resulted in the deaths of an estimated 9,000 civilians and military personnel, while a further 12,000 laborers and concentration camp prisoners died as a result of their forced participation in the production of the weapons.

The rockets traveled at supersonic speeds, impacted without audible warning, and proved unstoppable. No countermeasures existed except for misdirection and attacks on launch sites and manufacturing facilities. However, postwar and historical assessments found they had little material or strategic impact on the war, despite the great cost of the program.

Teams from the Allied forces—the United States, the United Kingdom, France and the Soviet Union—raced to procure the Germans' missile technology. Through Operation Paperclip and Operation Osoaviakhim, captured hardware and manufacturing facilities, the V-2 was very influential on later ballistic missile and spaceflight development.

== Development history ==
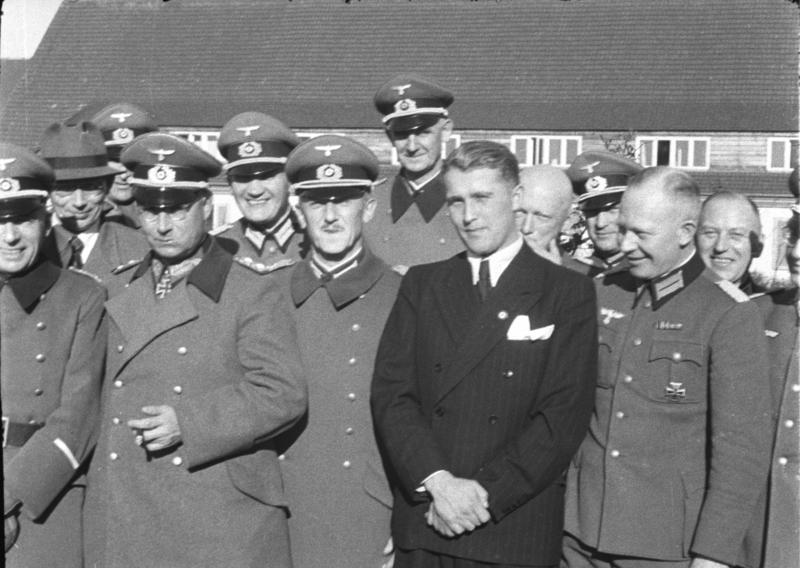
Wernher von Braun at Peenemünde Army Research Center

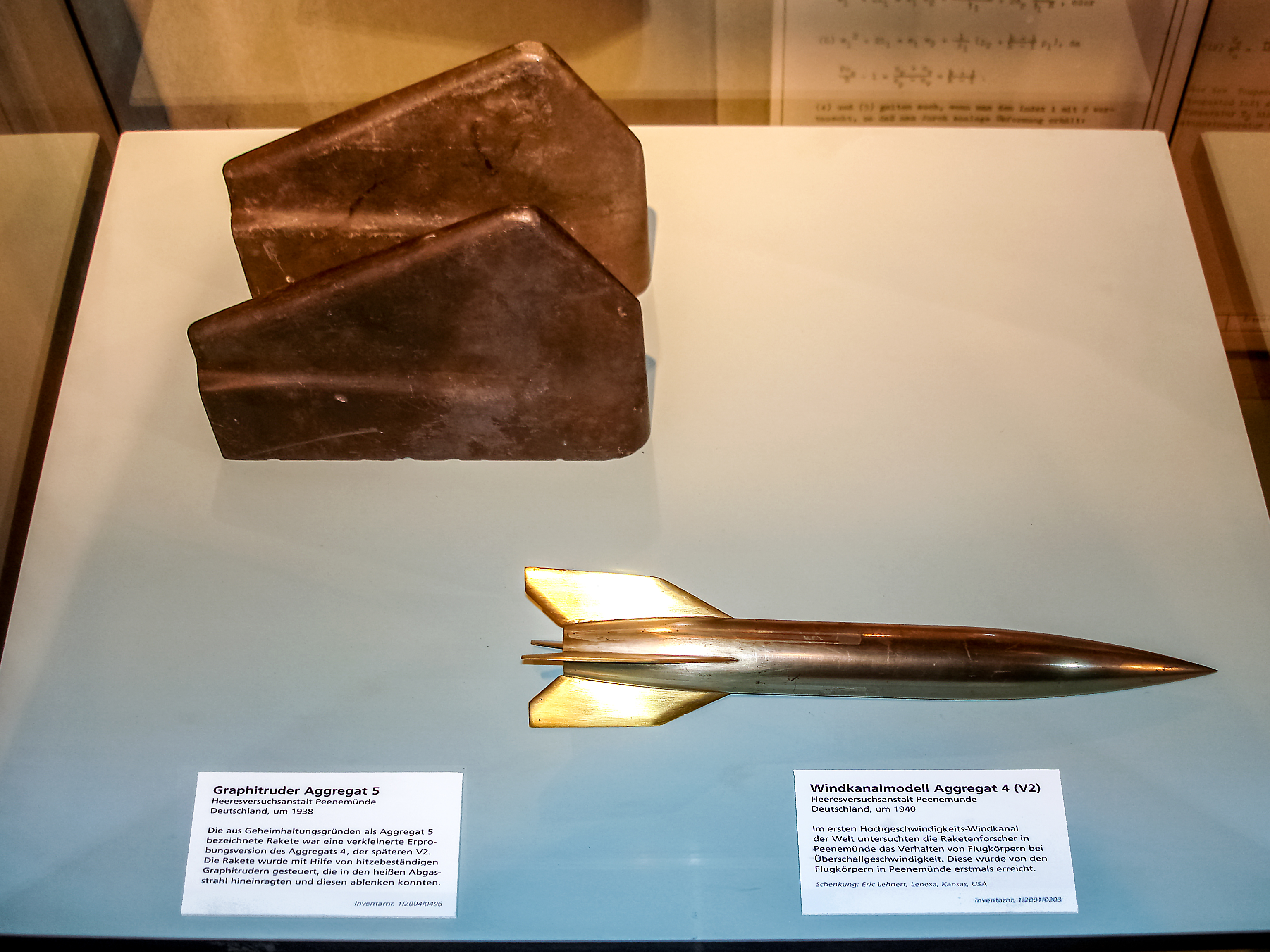
Wind tunnel model of an A4 in the German Museum of Technology in Berlin

During the late 1920s, a young Wernher von Braun bought a copy of Hermann Oberth's book, Die Rakete zu den Planetenräumen (The Rocket into Interplanetary Spaces). In 1928 a Raketenrummel or "Rocket Rumble" fad in the popular media was initiated by Fritz von Opel and Max Valier, a collaborator of Oberth, by experimenting with rockets, including public demonstrations of manned rocket cars and rocket planes. The "Rocket Rumble" was highly influential on von Braun as a teenage space enthusiast. He was so enthusiastic after seeing one of the public Opel-RAK rocket car demonstrations, that he constructed and launched his own homemade toy rocket car (known as the Ein Digen Cycle) on a crowded sidewalk and was later taken in for questioning by the local police, until he was released to his father for disciplinary action.

Starting in 1930, von Braun attended the Technische Hochschule in Charlottenburg (now Technische Universität Berlin), where he assisted Oberth in liquid-fueled rocket motor tests. Von Braun was working on his doctorate when the Nazi Party gained power in Germany. An artillery captain, Walter Dornberger, arranged an Ordnance Department research grant for von Braun, who from then on worked next to Dornberger's existing solid-fuel rocket test site at Kummersdorf. Von Braun's thesis, Construction, Theoretical, and Experimental Solution to the Problem of the Liquid Propellant Rocket (dated 16 April 1934), was kept classified by the German Army and was not published until 1960. By the end of 1934 his group had launched multiple rockets, two of which reached heights of 2.2 and 3.5 km (1.4 and 2.2 mi), respectively.

At the time, many Germans were interested in American physicist Robert H. Goddard's research. Before 1939, German engineers and scientists occasionally contacted Goddard directly with technical questions. Von Braun used Goddard's plans from various journals and incorporated them into the building of the Aggregate (A) series of rockets, named for the German word for mechanism or mechanical system.

After successes at Kummersdorf with the first two Aggregate series rockets, Braun and Walter Riedel began thinking of a much larger rocket in the summer of 1936, based on a projected 25,000 kg (55,000 lb) thrust engine. In addition, Dornberger specified the military requirements needed to include a 1-ton payload, a range of 172 miles with a dispersion of 2 or 3 miles, and transportable using road vehicles.

After the A-4 project was postponed due to unfavorable aerodynamic stability testing of the A-3 in July 1936, Braun specified the A-4 performance in 1937, and, after an "extensive" series of test firings of the A-5 scale test model, using a motor redesigned from the troublesome A-3 by Walter Thiel, A-4 design and construction was ordered c. 1938–39. When in 1939, Adolf Hitler was shown tests of rocket motors, he was not particularly impressed.

Nevertheless, in 28–30 September 1939, Der Tag der Weisheit (English: The Day of Wisdom) conference met at Peenemünde to initiate the funding of university research to solve rocket problems. By late 1941, the Army Research Center at Peenemünde possessed the technologies essential to the success of the A-4. The four main technologies for the A-4 were large liquid-fuel rocket engines, supersonic aerodynamics, gyroscopic guidance and rudders in jet control.

During early September 1943, Braun promised the Long-Range Bombardment Commission that the A-4 development was "practically complete/concluded", but even by the middle of 1944, a complete A-4 parts list was still unavailable. Hitler was sufficiently impressed by the enthusiasm of its developers, and needed a "wonder weapon" to maintain German morale, so he authorized its deployment in large numbers.

The V-2s were constructed at the Mittelwerk site by prisoners from Mittelbau-Dora, a concentration camp where 20,000 prisoners died.

In 1943, an Austrian resistance group led by Heinrich Maier managed to send exact drawings of the V-2 rocket to the American Office of Strategic Services. Location sketches of V-rocket manufacturing facilities, such as those in Peenemünde, were also sent to the Allied general staff in order to enable Allied bombers to perform airstrikes. This information was particularly important for Operation Crossbow and Operation Hydra, both preliminary missions for Operation Overlord. The group was gradually captured by the Gestapo and most of the members were executed.

== Technical details ==
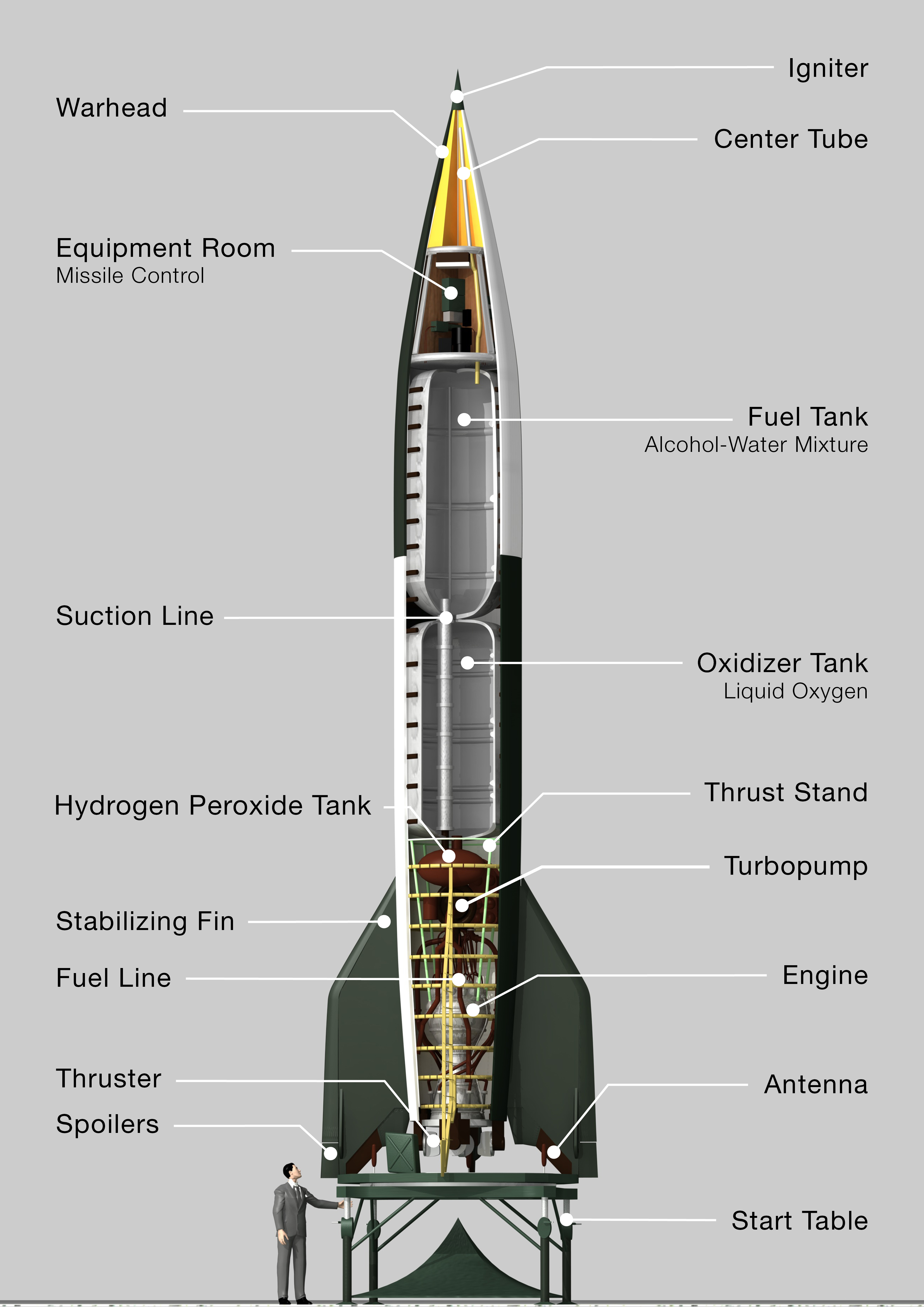
Layout of a V-2 rocket

The A4 used a 75% ethanol/25% water mixture (B-Stoff) for fuel and liquid oxygen (LOX) (A-Stoff) for oxidizer. The water reduced the flame temperature, acted as a coolant by turning to steam, augmented thrust, tended to produce a smoother burn, and reduced thermal stress.

Rudolf Hermann's supersonic wind tunnel was used to measure the A4's aerodynamic characteristics and center of pressure, using a model of the A4 within a 40 square centimeter chamber. Measurements were made using a Mach 1.86 blowdown nozzle on 8 August 1940. Tests at Mach numbers 1.56 and 2.5 were made after 24 September 1940.

At launch the A4 propelled itself for up to 65 seconds on its own power, and a program motor held the inclination at the specified angle until engine shutdown, after which the rocket continued on a ballistic free-fall trajectory. The rocket reached a height of 80 km (50 mi; 260,000 ft) after shutting off the engine.

The fuel and oxidizer pumps were driven by a steam turbine, fueled by decomposition of concentrated hydrogen peroxide (T-Stoff) facilitated by a sodium permanganate (Z-Stoff) catalyst. Both the alcohol and oxygen tanks were an aluminum-magnesium alloy.

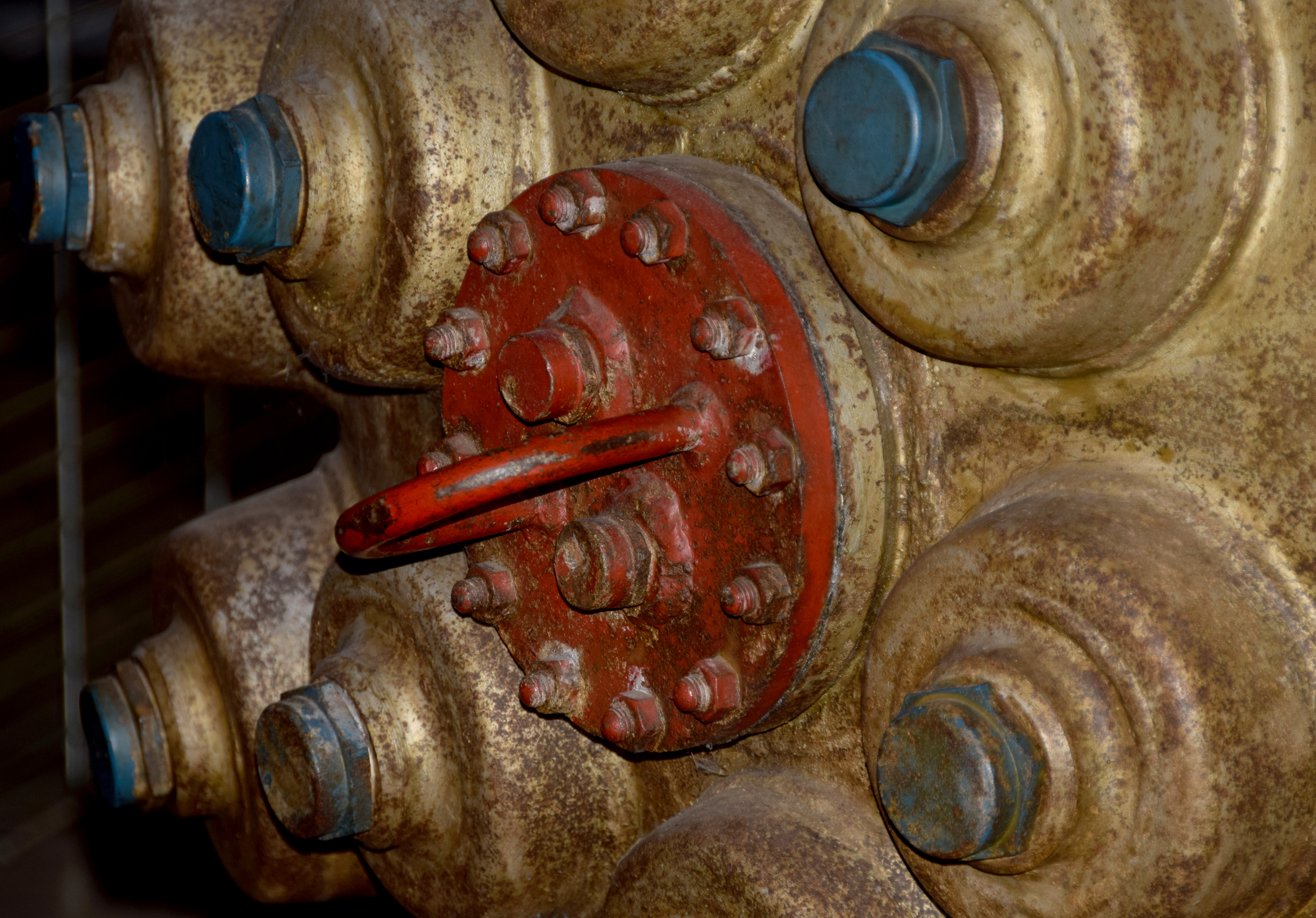
The flange for alcohol main valve of a V-2 rocket engine

The turbopump, rotating at 4,000 rpm, forced the fuel mixture and oxygen into the combustion chamber at 125 liters (33 US gallons) per second, where they were ignited by a spinning electrical igniter. The engine produced 8 tons of thrust during the preliminary stage whilst the fuel was gravity-fed, before increasing to 25 tons as the turbopump pressurised the fuel, lifting the 13.5 ton rocket. Combustion gases exited the chamber at 2,820 °C (5,100 °F), and a speed of 2,000 m (6,600 ft) per second. The oxygen to fuel mixture was 1.0:0.85 at 25 tons of thrust; as ambient pressure decreased with flight altitude, thrust increased to 29 tons. The turbopump assembly contained two centrifugal pumps, one for the fuel mixture, and one for the oxygen. The turbine was connected directly by a shaft to the alcohol pump and through a flexible joint and shaft to the oxygen pump. The turbopump delivered 55 kg (121 lb) of alcohol and 68 kg (150 lb) of liquid oxygen per second to a combustion chamber at 1.5 MPa (218 psi).

Dr. Thiel's 25 ton rocket motor design relied on pump feeding, as opposed to earlier pressure-fed designs. The motor used centrifugal injection, and used both regenerative cooling and film cooling. Film cooling admitted alcohol into the combustion chamber and exhaust nozzle under slight pressure through four rings of small perforations. The mushroom-shaped injection head was removed from the combustion chamber to a mixing chamber, the combustion chamber was made more spherical while being shortened from 6 to 1-foot in length, and the connection to the nozzle was made cone shaped. The resultant 1.5 ton chamber operated at a combustion pressure of 1.52 MPa (220 psi). Thiel's 1.5 ton chamber was then scaled up to a 4.5 ton motor by arranging three injection heads above the combustion chamber. By 1939, eighteen injection heads in two concentric circles at the head of the 3 mm (0.12 in) thick sheet-steel chamber, were used to make the 25 ton motor.

The warhead was a source of trouble. The explosive used was amatol 60/40 detonated by an electric contact fuze. Amatol had the advantage of stability, and the warhead was protected by a thick layer of glass wool, but even so it could still explode during the re-entry phase. The warhead weighed 975 kilograms (2,150 lb) and contained 910 kilograms (2,010 lb) of explosive. The warhead's explosive percentage by weight was 93%, a very high proportion compared to other types of munitions.

A protective layer of glass wool was also used for the fuel tanks to prevent the A-4 from forming ice, a problem which plagued other early ballistic missiles such as the balloon tank-design SM-65 Atlas which entered US service in 1959. The tanks held 4,173 kilograms (9,200 lb) of ethyl alcohol and 5,553 kilograms (12,242 lb) of oxygen.

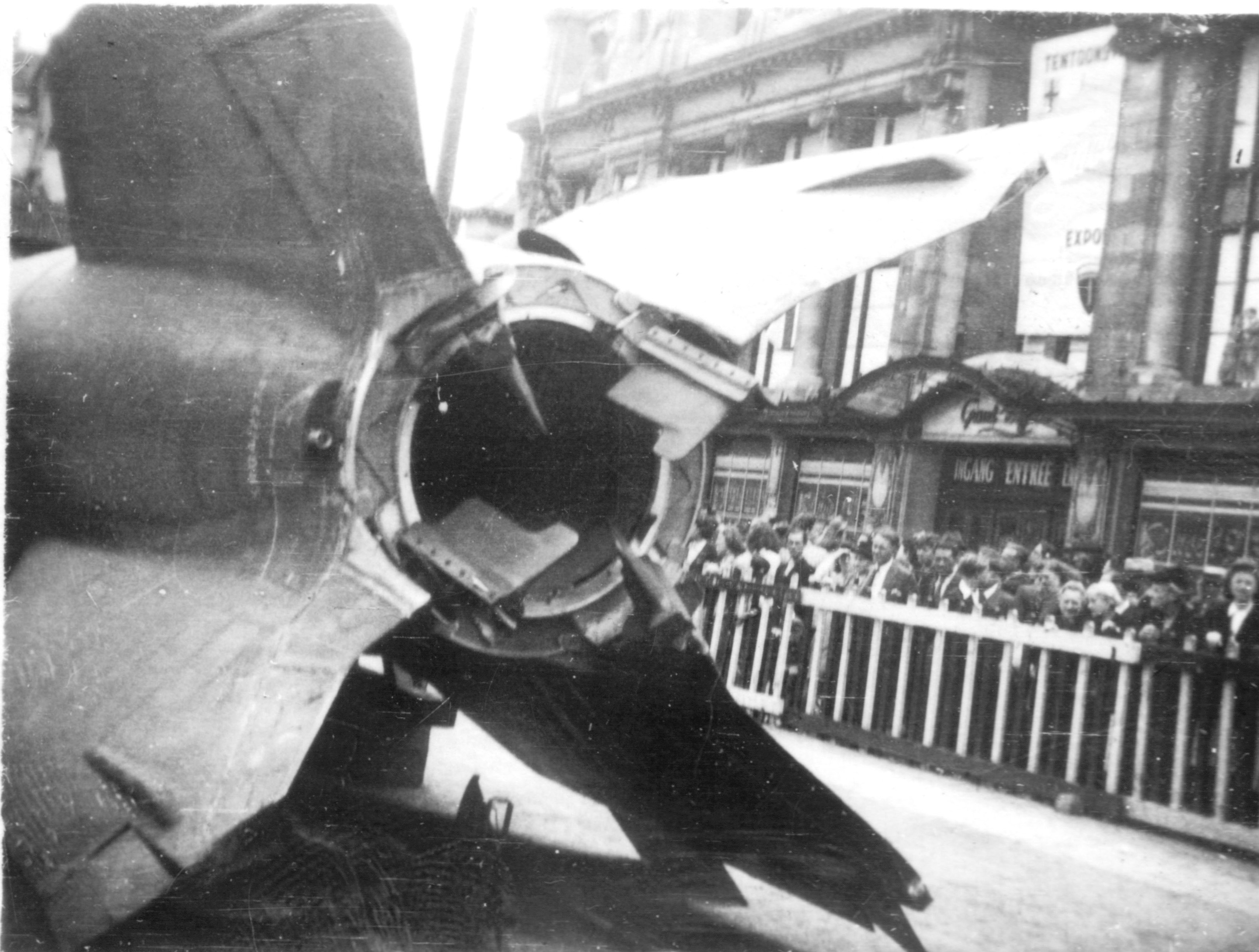
Captured V-2 on public display in Antwerp, 1945. Exhaust vanes and external rudders in tail section shown.

The V-2 was guided by four external rudders on the tail fins, and four internal graphite vanes in the jet stream at the exit of the motor. These 8 control surfaces were controlled by Helmut Hölzer's analog computer, the Mischgerät, via electrical-hydraulic servomotors, based on electrical signals from the gyros. The Siemens Vertikant LEV-3 guidance system consisted of two free gyroscopes (a horizontal for pitch and a vertical with two degrees of freedom for yaw and roll) for lateral stabilization, coupled with a PIGA accelerometer, or the Walter Wolman radio control system, to control engine cutoff at a specified velocity. Other gyroscopic systems used in the A-4 included Kreiselgeräte's SG-66 and SG-70. The V-2 was launched from a pre-surveyed location, so the distance and azimuth to the target were known. Fin 1 of the missile was aligned to the target azimuth.

Some later V-2s used "guide beams", radio signals transmitted from the ground, as an added input to the Mischgerät analog computer to keep the missile on course in azimuth. The flying distance was controlled by the timing of the engine cut-off, Brennschluss, ground-controlled by a Doppler system or by different types of on-board integrating accelerometers. Thus, range was a function of engine burn time, which ended when a specific velocity was achieved. Just before engine cutoff, thrust was reduced to eight tons, in an effort to avoid any water hammer problems a rapid cutoff could cause.

"V-2 Rocket Assembling and Launching" (1947) de-classified official United States War Department information film reel.

Dr. Friedrich Kirchstein of Siemens of Berlin developed the V-2 radio control for motor cutoff (German: Brennschluss). For velocity measurement, Professor Wolman of Dresden created an alternative of his Doppler tracking system in 1940–41, which used a ground signal transponded by the A-4 to measure the velocity of the missile. By 9 February 1942, Peenemünde engineer Gerd deBeek had documented the radio interference area of a V-2 as 10,000 metres (33,000 feet) around the "Firing Point", and the first successful A-4 flight on 3 October 1942 used radio control to command motor cutoff. Although Hitler commented on 22 September 1943 that "It is a great load off our minds that we have dispensed with the radio guiding-beam; now no opening remains for the British to interfere technically with the missile in flight", about 20% of the operational V-2 launches were beam-guided. The Operation Pinguin V-2 offensive began on 8 September 1944, when Lehr- und Versuchsbatterie No. 444 (English: 'Training and Testing Battery 444') launched a single rocket guided by a radio beam directed at Paris. Wreckage of combat V-2s occasionally contained the transponder for velocity and fuel cutoff.

The painting of the operational V-2s was mostly a ragged-edged pattern with several variations, but at the end of the war a plain olive green rocket was also used. During tests the rocket was painted in a characteristic black-and-white chessboard pattern, which aided in determining if the rocket was spinning around its longitudinal axis.

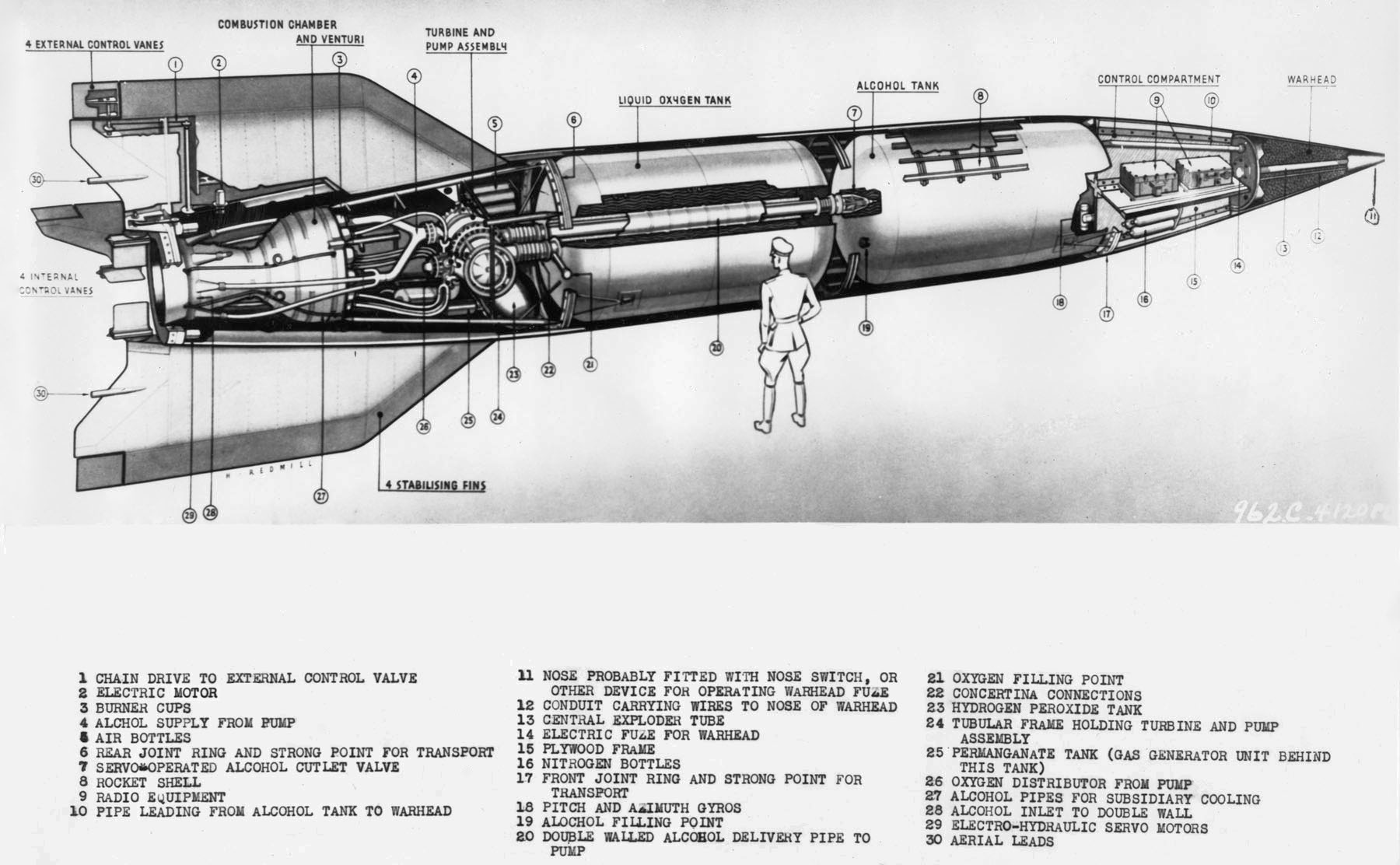
A US Army cut-away diagram of the V-2

The original German designation of the rocket was "V2", unhyphenated – exactly as used for any Third Reich-era "second prototype" example of an RLM-registered German aircraft design – but US publications such as Life magazine were using the hyphenated form "V-2" as early as December 1944.

=== Testing ===
The fourth flight was the first successful test flight and occurred on 3 October 1942, with rocket V-4, reaching an altitude of 84.5 kilometres (52.5 miles). On that day, Walter Dornberger declared in a meeting at Peenemünde:

This third day of October, 1942, is the first of a new era in transportation, that of space travel...^{17}

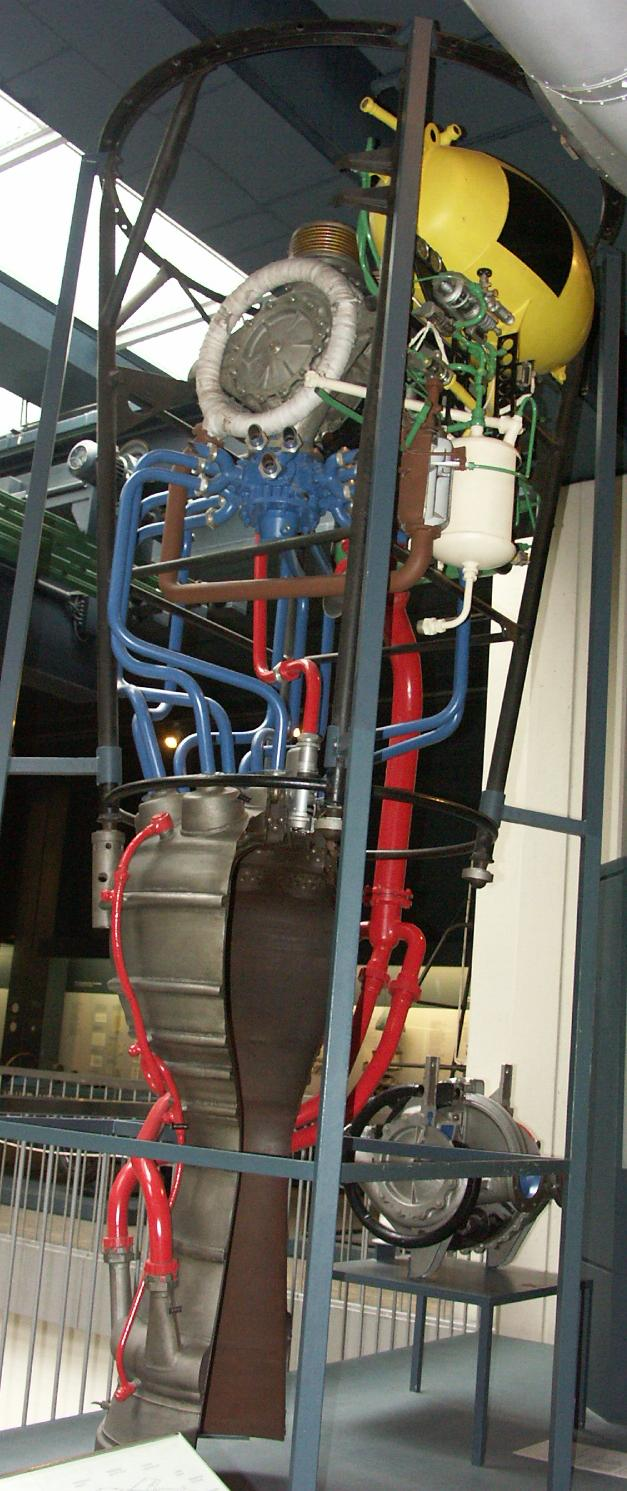
A sectioned V-2 engine on display at the Deutsches Museum, Munich (2006)

Two test launches were recovered by the Allies: the Bäckebo rocket, the remnants of which landed in Sweden on 13 June 1944, and one recovered by the Polish resistance on 30 May 1944 from the Blizna V-2 missile launch site and transported to the UK during Operation Most III. The highest altitude reached during the war was 174.6 kilometres (108.5 miles) (20 June 1944). Test launches of V-2 rockets were made at Peenemünde, Blizna and Tuchola Forest, and after the war, at Cuxhaven by the British, White Sands Proving Grounds and Cape Canaveral by the US, and Kapustin Yar by the USSR.

Various design issues were identified and solved during V-2 development and testing:

- To reduce tank pressure and weight, rapid flow turbopumps were used to increase pressure.
- A short and lighter combustion chamber without burn-through was developed by using centrifugal injection nozzles, a mixing compartment, and a converging nozzle to the throat for homogeneous combustion.
- Film cooling was used to prevent burn-through at the nozzle throat.
- Relay contacts were made more durable to withstand vibration and prevent thrust cut-off just after lift-off.
- Ensuring that the fuel pipes had tension-free curves reduced the likelihood of explosions at 1,200–1,800 m (4,000–6,000 ft).
- Fins were shaped with clearance to prevent damage as the exhaust jet expanded with altitude.
- To control trajectory at liftoff and supersonic speeds, heat-resistant graphite vanes were used as rudders in the exhaust jet.

==== Air burst problem ====
Through mid-March 1944, only four of the 26 successful Blizna launches had satisfactorily reached the Sarnaki target area due to in-flight breakup (Luftzerleger) on re-entry into the atmosphere. (As mentioned above, one rocket was collected by the Polish Home Army, with parts of it transported to London for tests.) Initially, the German developers suspected excessive alcohol tank pressure, but by April 1944, after five months of test firings, the cause was still not determined. Major-General Rossmann, the Army Weapons Office department chief, recommended stationing observers in the target area – c. May/June, Dornberger and von Braun set up a camp at the centre of the Poland target zone. After moving to the Heidekraut, SS Mortar Battery 500 of the 836th Artillery Battalion (Motorized) was ordered on 30 August to begin test launches of eighty 'sleeved' rockets. Testing confirmed that the so-called 'tin trousers' – a tube designed to strengthen the forward end of the rocket cladding – reduced the likelihood of air bursts.

==== Alcohol consumption issues ====
Due to its ethanol fuel, testing of the V-2 was hampered on several occasions due to technicians stealing and consuming the alcohol, which was palatable enough to drink. Initial attempts at preventing the theft of alcohol included adding a pink dye to the fuel to make it less appealing, but this failed when it was found that the dye could easily be filtered out of the alcohol using potatoes. A purgative was added to the fuel, but technicians continued to consume it, resulting in launch tests being delayed due to the effects of the purgative. Finally, methanol (methyl alcohol) was mixed into the fuel to make it toxic, resulting in one man suffering from vision loss and at least one other person dying from methanol poisoning.

== Production ==
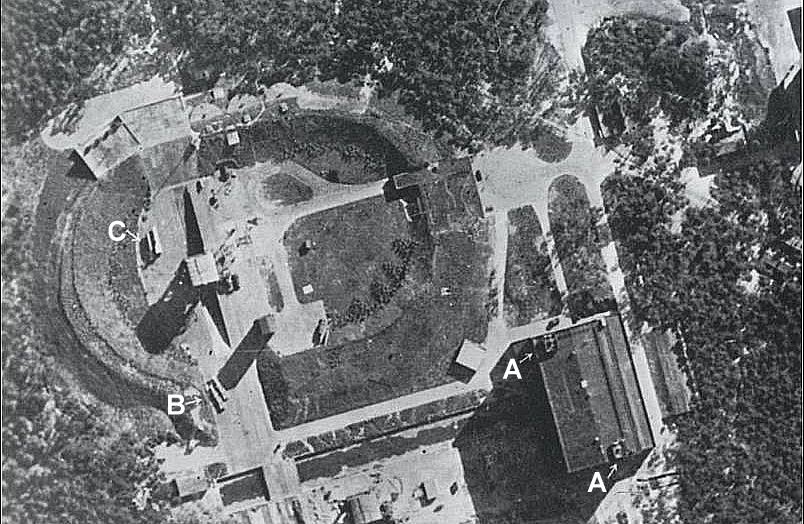
23 June 1943 RAF reconnaissance photo of V-2s at Test Stand VII in Peenemünde

On 27 March 1942, Dornberger proposed production plans and the building of a launching site on the Channel coast. In December, Speer ordered Major Thom and Dr. Steinhoff to reconnoitre the site near Watten. Assembly rooms were established at Peenemünde and in the Friedrichshafen facilities of Zeppelin Works. In 1943, a third factory, Raxwerke, was added.

On 22 December 1942, Hitler signed the order for mass production, when Albert Speer assumed final technical data would be ready by July 1943. However, many issues still remained to be solved even by the autumn of 1943.

On 8 January 1943, Dornberger and von Braun met with Speer. Speer stated, "As head of the Todt organisation I will take it on myself to start at once with the building of the launching site on the Channel coast," and established an A-4 production committee under Degenkolb.

On 26 May 1943, the Long-Range Bombardment Commission, chaired by AEG director Petersen, met at Peenemünde to review the V-1 and V-2 automatic long-range weapons. In attendance were Speer, Air Marshal Erhard Milch, Admiral Karl Dönitz, Col. General Friedrich Fromm, and Karl Saur. Both weapons had reached the final stage of development, and the commission decided to recommend to Hitler that both weapons be mass-produced. As Dornberger observed, "The disadvantages of the one would be compensated by the other's advantages."

Production
Period of production	Production	Rate per month
Up to 15 September 1944	1,900	~100
15 September to 29 October 1944	900	600
29 October to 24 November 1944	600	750
24 November to 15 January 1945	1,100	650
15 January to 15 February 1945	700	700

On 7 July 1943, Major General Dornberger, von Braun, and Dr. Steinhof briefed Hitler in his Wolf's Lair. Also in attendance were Speer, Wilhelm Keitel, and Alfred Jodl. The briefing included von Braun narrating a movie showing the successful launch on 3 October 1942, with scale models of the Channel coast firing bunker, and supporting vehicles, including the Meillerwagen. Hitler then gave Peenemünde top priority in the German armaments program stating, "Why was it I could not believe in the success of your work? if we had had these rockets in 1939 we should never have had this war..." Hitler also wanted a second launch bunker built.

Saur planned to build 2,000 rockets per month, between the existing three factories and the Nordhausen Mittelwerk factory being built. However, alcohol production was dependent upon the potato harvest.

A production line was nearly ready at Peenemünde when the Operation Hydra attack occurred. The main targets of the attack included the test stands, the development works, the Pre-Production Works, the settlement where the scientists and technicians lived, the Trassenheide camp, and the harbor sector. According to Dornberger, "Serious damage to the works, contrary to first impressions, was surprisingly small." Work resumed after a delay of four to six weeks, and because of camouflage to mimic complete destruction, there were no more raids during the next nine months. The raid resulted in 735 lives lost, with heavy losses at Trassenheide, while 178 were killed in the settlement, including Dr. Thiel, his family, and Chief Engineer Walther. The Germans eventually moved production to the underground Mittelwerk in the Kohnstein where V-1 and V-2 weapons were built with the use of forced labour. After September 1944, this would average a production rate of 600 to 700 per month, eventually producing 5,789 verifiable Mittelwerk models, plus 150-200 previous test models built at Peenemunde. Production ended at the start of April 1945 as American forces approached.

Liquid oxygen production capacity, the critical total weapon system component for V-2 battlefield use, started to come online from 1942 at the newly built second factory in Peenemünde, with additional factories planned for the other production sites at Zeppelin Works and Raxwerke, as well as factories in occupied Belgium and France, including the launch bunker at Watten. Following the decision to move production underground in August 1943, the oxygen machines in the Reich were moved into caves. At the start of the rocket campaign, liquid oxygen for the V-2 was produced in factories in Wittring, Lehesten, Redl-Zipf, Oberraderach, and Peenemünde. The oxygen machines installed in Liège and sites in the occupied West were captured by Allied troops before the first battlefield launch.

== Launch sites ==
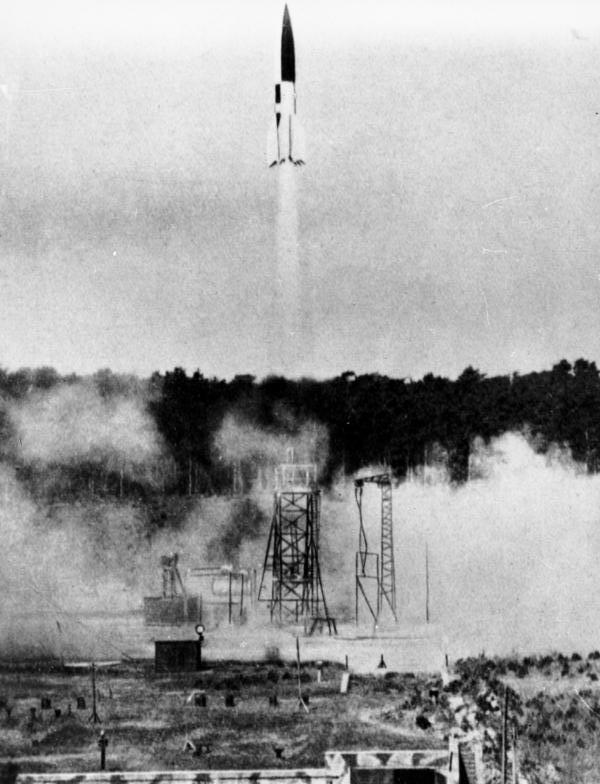
A V-2 launched from Test Stand VII in summer 1943.

After the Operation Crossbow bombing, initial plans for launching from the massive underground Watten, Wizernes and Sottevast bunkers or from fixed pads such as near the Château du Molay were dismissed in favour of mobile launching. Eight main storage dumps were planned and four had been completed by July 1944 (the one at Mery-sur-Oise was begun during August 1943 and completed by February 1944). The missile could be launched practically anywhere, although roads running through forests were a particular favourite. The system was so mobile and small that only one Meillerwagen was ever caught in action by Allied aircraft, during the Operation Bodenplatte attack on 1 January 1945 near Lochem by a USAAF 4th Fighter Group aircraft, although Raymond Baxter described flying over a site during a launch and his wingman firing at the missile without hitting it.

It was estimated that a sustained rate of 350 V-2s could be launched per week, with 100 per day at maximum effort, given sufficient supply of the rockets.

== Operational history ==
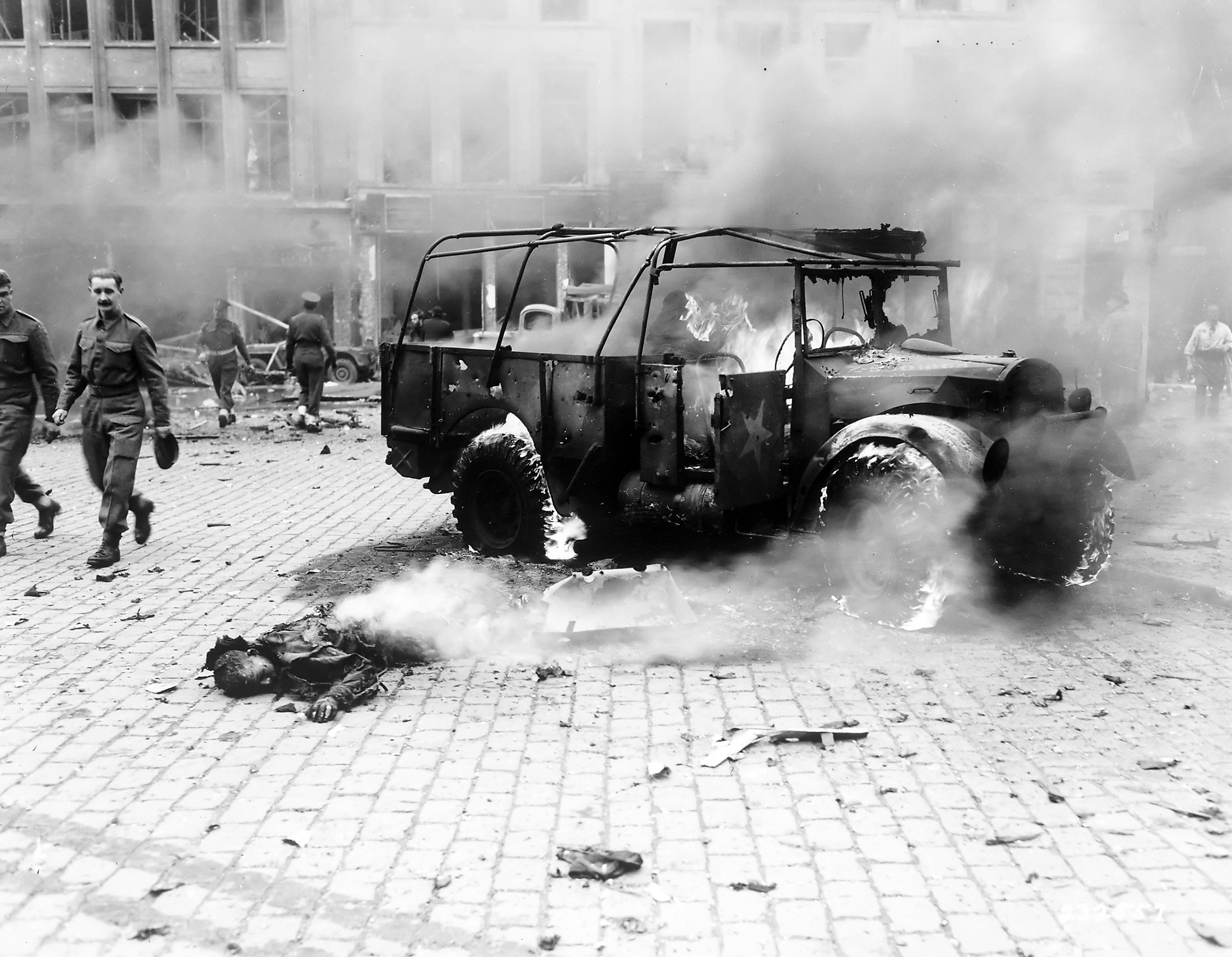
One of the victims of a V-2 that struck Teniers Square, Antwerp, Belgium, on 27 November 1944. A British military convoy was passing through the square at the time; 126 people (including 26 Allied soldiers) were killed.

The LXV Armeekorps z.b.V. formed during the last days of November 1943 in France commanded by General der Artillerie z.V. Erich Heinemann was responsible for the operational use of V-2. Three launch battalions were formed in late 1943, Artillerie Abteilung 836 (Mot.), Grossborn, Artillerie Abteilung 485 (Mot.), Naugard, and Artillerie Abteilung 962 (Mot.). Combat operations commenced in Sept. 1944, when training Batterie 444 deployed. On 2 September 1944, the SS Werfer-Abteilung 500 was formed, and by October, the SS under the command of SS Lt. Gen Hans Kammler, took operational control of all units. He formed Gruppe Süd with Art. Abt. 836, Merzig, and Gruppe Nord with Art. Abt. 485 and Batterie 444, Burgsteinfurt and The Hague.

After Hitler's 29 August 1944 declaration to begin V-2 attacks as soon as possible, the offensive began on 7 September 1944 when two were launched at Paris (which the Allies had liberated less than two weeks earlier), but both crashed soon after launch. On 8 September a single rocket was launched at Paris, which caused modest damage near Porte d'Italie. Two more launches by the 485th followed, including one from The Hague against London on the same day at 6:43 pm. – the first landed at Staveley Road, Chiswick, killing 63-year-old Mrs. Ada Harrison, three-year-old Rosemary Clarke, and Sapper Bernard Browning on leave from the Royal Engineers, and one that hit Epping with no casualties.

The British government, concerned about spreading panic or giving away vital intelligence to German forces, initially attempted to conceal the cause of the explosions by making no official announcement, and euphemistically blaming them on defective gas mains. The public did not believe this explanation and therefore began referring to the V-2s as "flying gas mains". The Germans themselves finally announced the V-2 on 8 November 1944 and only then, on 10 November 1944, did Winston Churchill inform Parliament, and the world, that England had been under rocket attack "for the last few weeks".

In September 1944, control of the V-2 mission was transferred to the Waffen-SS and Division z.V.

Positions of the German launch units changed a number of times. For example, Artillerie Init 444 arrived in the southwest Netherlands (in Zeeland) in September 1944. From a field near the village of Serooskerke, five V-2s were launched on 15 and 16 September, with one more successful and one failed launch on the 18th. That same date, a transport carrying a missile took a wrong turn and ended up in Serooskerke itself, giving a villager the opportunity to surreptitiously take some photographs of the weapon; these were smuggled to London by the Dutch Resistance. After that the unit moved to the woods near Rijs, Gaasterland in the northwest Netherlands, to ensure that the technology was not captured by the Allies. From Gaasterland V-2s were launched against Ipswich and Norwich from 25 September (London being out of range). Because of their inaccuracy, these V-2s did not hit their target cities. Soon after that only London and Antwerp remained as designated targets as ordered by Adolf Hitler himself, Antwerp being targeted in the period of 12 to 20 October, after which time the unit moved to The Hague.

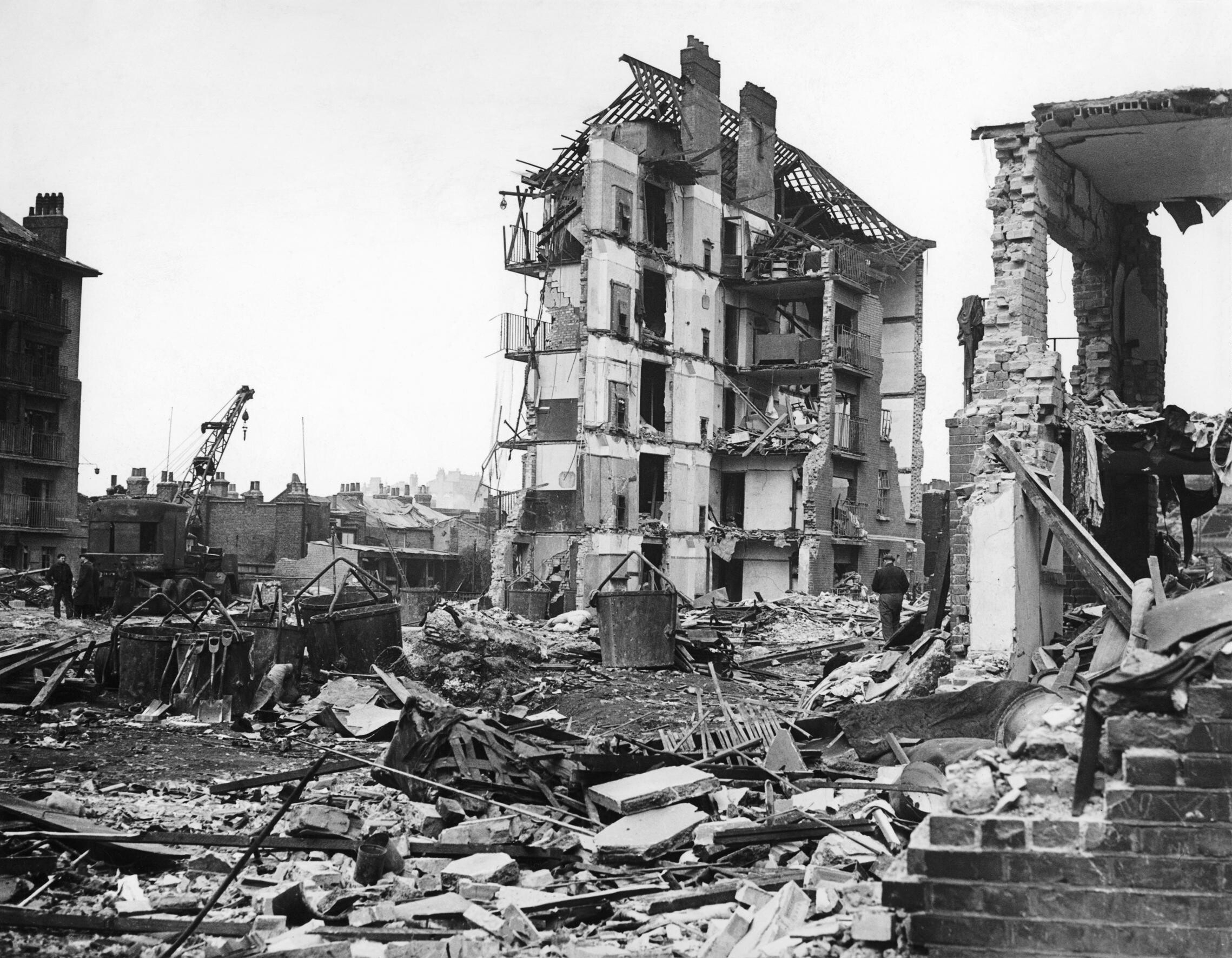
Ruined buildings at Whitechapel, London, left by the penultimate V-2 to strike the city on 27 March 1945; the rocket killed 134 people. The final V-2 to fall on London killed one person at Orpington later that same day.

== Targets ==
During the succeeding months about 3,172 V-2 rockets were fired at the following targets:

- Belgium, 1,664: Antwerp (1,610), Liège (27), Hasselt (13), Tournai (9), Mons (3), Diest (2)
- United Kingdom, 1,402: London (1,358), Norwich (43), Ipswich (1)
- France, 76: Lille (25), Paris (22), Tourcoing (19), Arras (6), Cambrai (4)
- Netherlands, 19: Maastricht (19)
- Germany, 11: Remagen (Ludendorff Bridge) (11)

Antwerp, Belgium was a target for a large number of V-weapon attacks from October 1944 through to the virtual end of the war in March 1945, leaving 1,736 dead and 4,500 injured in greater Antwerp. Thousands of buildings were damaged or destroyed as the city was struck by 590 direct hits. Hitler's hope that the Port of Antwerp dock gates would be hit and the port put out of action was not achieved. The largest loss of life by a single rocket attack during the war came on 16 December 1944, when the roof of the crowded Cine Rex was struck, leaving 567 dead and 291 injured.

An estimated 2,754 civilians were killed in London by V-2 attacks with another 6,523 injured, which is two people killed per V-2 rocket. The death toll in London did not meet the Nazis' full expectations, during early usage, as they had not yet perfected the accuracy of the V-2, with many rockets being misdirected and exploding harmlessly. Accuracy increased during the war, particularly for batteries where the Leitstrahl (radio guide beam) system was used. Missile strikes that did hit targets could cause large numbers of deaths; 160 were killed and 108 seriously injured in one explosion at 12:26 pm on 25 November 1944, at a Woolworth's department store in New Cross, south-east London. British intelligence also helped impede the effectiveness of the Nazi weapon, sending false reports via their Double-Cross System implying that the rockets were over-shooting their London target by 10 to 20 miles (16 to 32 km). This tactic worked; more than half of the V-2s aimed at London landed short of the London Civil Defence Region. Most landed on less-heavily populated areas in Kent due to erroneous recalibration. For the remainder of the war, British intelligence maintained the ruse by repeatedly sending bogus reports implying that these failed rockets were striking the British capital with heavy loss of life.

=== Possible use during Operation Bodenplatte ===
At least one V-2 missile on a mobile Meillerwagen launch trailer was observed being elevated to launch position by a USAAF 4th Fighter Group pilot defending against the massive New Year's Day 1945 Operation Bodenplatte strike by the Luftwaffe over the northern German attack route near the town of Lochem on 1 January 1945. Possibly, from the potential sighting of the American fighter by the missile's launch crew, the rocket was quickly lowered from a near launch-ready 85° elevation to 30°.

=== Tactical use on German target ===
After the US Army captured the Ludendorff Bridge during the Battle of Remagen on 7 March 1945, the Germans were desperate to destroy it. On 17 March 1945, they fired eleven V-2 missiles at the bridge, their first use against a tactical target and the only time they were fired on a German target during the war. They could not employ the more accurate Leitstrahl device because it was oriented towards Antwerp and could not be easily adjusted for another target. Fired from near Hellendoorn, the Netherlands, one of the missiles landed as far away as Cologne, 40 miles (64 km) to the north, while one missed the bridge by only 500 to 800 yards (460 to 730 m). They also struck the town of Remagen, destroying a number of buildings and killing at least six American soldiers.

=== Final use ===
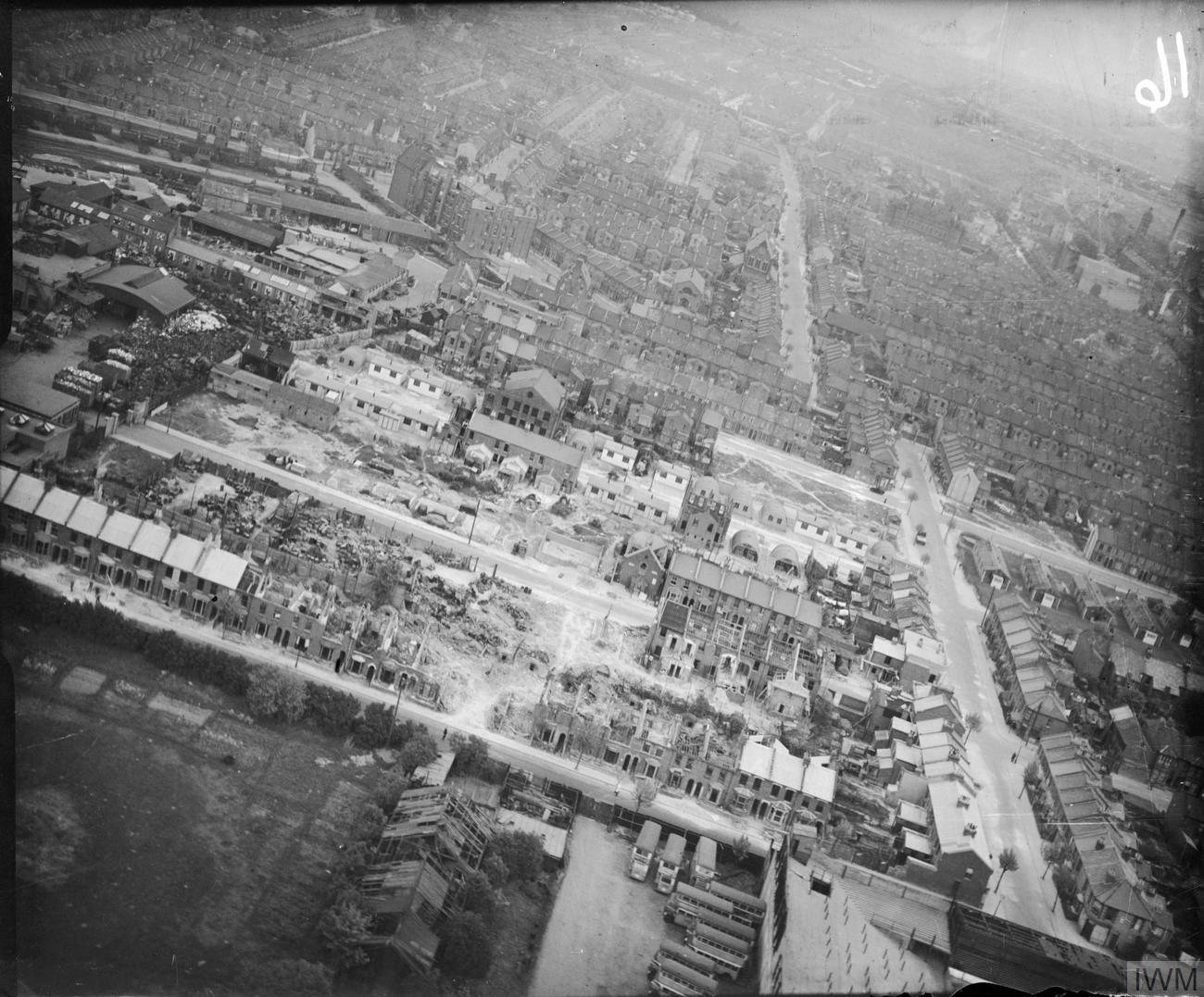
The extent of damage caused to a residential area in East Ham, London due to a single V-2 strike in January 1945

The final two rockets exploded on 27 March 1945. One of these was the last V-2 to kill a British civilian and the final civilian casualty of the war on British soil: Ivy Millichamp, aged 34, killed in her home in Kynaston Road, Orpington in Kent. A scientific reconstruction performed in 2010 demonstrated that the V-2 creates a crater 20 metres (66 feet) wide and 8 metres (26 feet) deep, ejecting approximately 3,000 tons of material into the air.

== Countermeasures ==
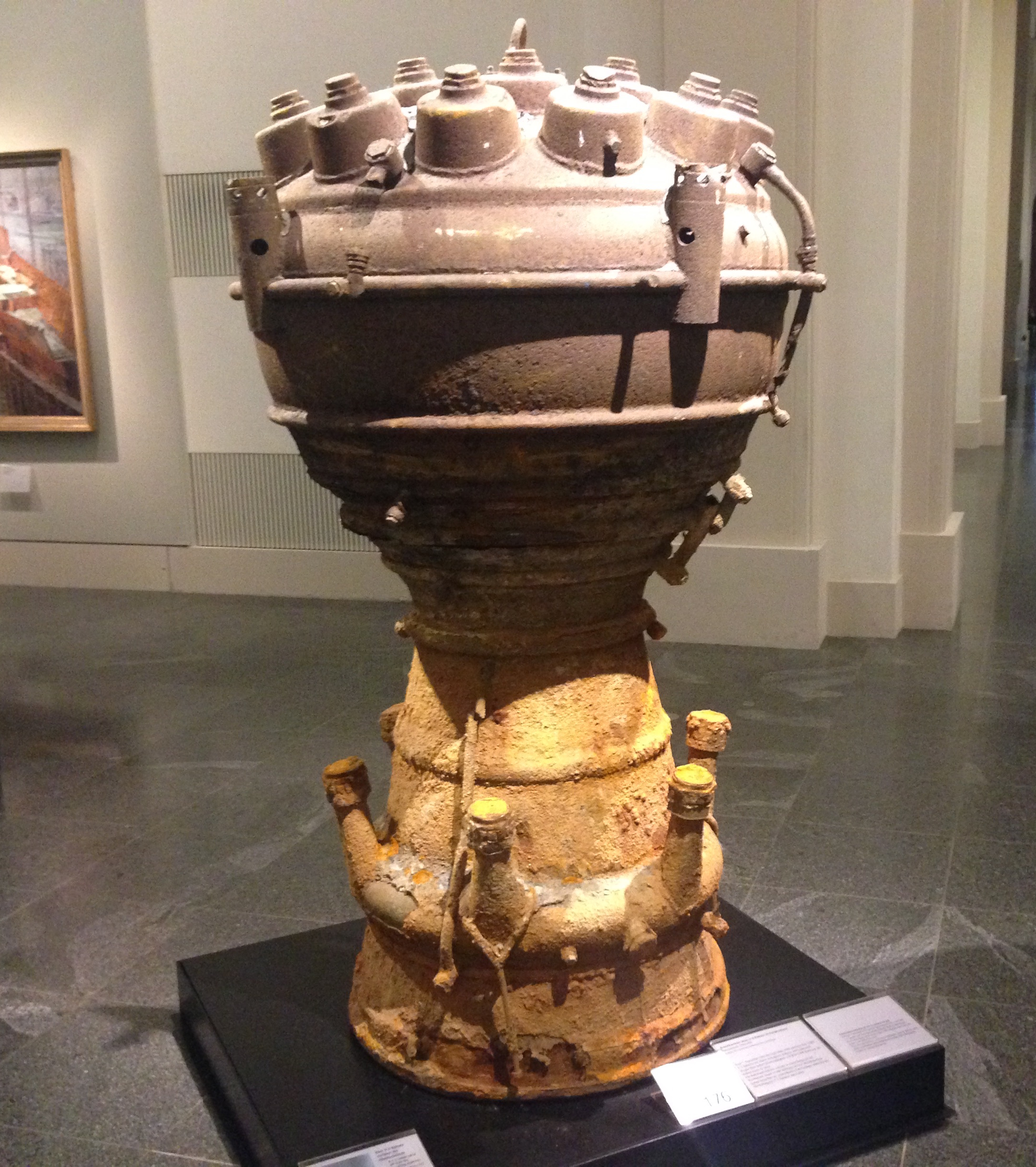
Rocket engine used by V-2, Deutsches Historisches Museum, Berlin (2014)

=== Big Ben and Operation Crossbow ===
Unlike the V-1, the V-2's speed and trajectory made it practically invulnerable to anti-aircraft guns and fighters, as it dropped from an altitude of 100–110 km (62–68 mi) at up to three times the speed of sound at sea level (approximately 3,550 km/h (2,206 mph)). Nevertheless, the threat of what was then code-named "Big Ben" was great enough that efforts were made to seek countermeasures. The situation was similar to the pre-war concerns about manned bombers and resulted in a similar solution, the formation of the Crossbow Committee, to collect, examine and develop countermeasures.

Early on, it was believed that the V-2 employed some form of radio guidance, a belief that persisted in spite of several rockets being examined without discovering anything like a radio receiver. This resulted in efforts to jam this non-existent guidance system as early as September 1944, using both ground and air-based jammers flying over the UK. In October, a group had been sent to jam the missiles during launch. By December it was clear these systems were not having any obvious effect, and jamming efforts ended.

=== Anti-aircraft gun system (proposed) ===
General Frederick Alfred Pile, commander of Anti-Aircraft Command, studied the problem and proposed that enough anti-aircraft guns were available to produce a barrage of fire in the rocket's path, but only if provided with a reasonable prediction of the trajectory. The first estimates suggested that 320,000 shells would have to be fired for each rocket. About 2% of these were expected to fall back to the ground unexploded containing almost 90 tons of explosives, which would cause far more damage than the missile. At a 25 August 1944 meeting of the Crossbow Committee, the concept was rejected.

Pile continued studying the problem and returned with a proposal to fire only 150 shells at a single rocket, with those shells using a new fuse that would greatly reduce the number that fell back to Earth unexploded. Some low-level analysis suggested that this would be successful against 1 in 50 rockets, provided that accurate trajectories were forwarded to the gunners in time. Work on this basic concept continued and developed into a plan to deploy a large number of guns in Hyde Park that were provided with pre-configured firing data for 2.5-mile (4.0-kilometre) grids of the London area. After the trajectory was determined, the guns would aim and fire between 60 and 500 rounds.

At a Crossbow meeting on 15 January 1945 Pile's updated plan was presented with some strong advocacy from Roderic Hill and Charles Drummond Ellis. However, the Committee suggested that a test not be performed as no technique for tracking the missiles with sufficient accuracy had yet been developed. By March this had changed significantly, with 81% of incoming missiles correctly allotted to the grid square each fell into, or the one beside it. At a 26 March meeting Pile was directed to a subcommittee with RV Jones and Ellis to further develop the statistics. Three days later the team returned a report stating that if the guns fired 2,000 rounds at a missile there was a 1 in 60 chance of shooting it down. Plans for an operational test began, but as Pile later put it, "Monty beat us to it", as the attacks ended with the Allied capture of their launching areas.

With the Germans no longer in control of any part of the continent that could be used as a launching site capable of striking London, they began targeting Antwerp. Plans were made to move the Pile system to protect that city, but the war ended before anything could be done.

=== Direct attack and disinformation ===
The only effective defences against the V-2 campaign were to destroy the launch infrastructure—expensive in terms of bomber resources and casualties—or to cause the Germans to aim at the wrong place by disinformation. The British were able to convince the Germans to direct V-1s and V-2s aimed at London to less populated areas east of the city. This was done by sending deceptive reports on the sites hit and damage caused via the German espionage network in Britain, which was secretly controlled by the British (the Double-Cross System).

According to the BBC television presenter Raymond Baxter, who served with the RAF during the war, in February 1945 his squadron was performing a mission against a V-2 launch site, when they saw one missile being launched. One member of Baxter's squadron opened fire on it, without effect.

On 3 March 1945, the Allies attempted to destroy V-2s and launching equipment in the "Haagse Bos" in The Hague by a large-scale bombardment, but due to navigational errors the Bezuidenhout quarter was destroyed, killing 511 Dutch civilians.

== Assessment ==
The German V-weapons (V-1 and V-2) cost, as a conservative estimate, around 2 billion ℛ︁ℳ︁ the equivalent of about 500 million wartime US dollars. Given the relatively smaller size of the German economy, this represented an industrial effort equivalent to but slightly less than that of the US Manhattan Project that produced the atomic bomb. Approximately 6,000 V-2s were built, for which the Reich paid 450 million ℛ︁ℳ︁, equating to a unit cost of around 80,000 ℛ︁ℳ︁. However, this excluded the cost of the warhead, guidance system, and needed infrastructure. Around 3200 were launched.

SS General Hans Kammler, who as an engineer had constructed several concentration camps including Auschwitz, had a reputation for brutality and had originated the idea of using concentration camp prisoners as slave laborers for the rocket program. More people died manufacturing the V-2 than were killed by its deployment.

... those of us who were seriously engaged in the war were very grateful to Wernher von Braun. We knew that each V-2 cost as much to produce as a high-performance fighter airplane. We knew that German forces on the fighting fronts were in desperate need of airplanes, and that the V-2 rockets were doing us no military damage. From our point of view, the V-2 program was almost as good as if Hitler had adopted a policy of unilateral disarmament.

— Freeman Dyson

The V-2 consumed a third of Germany's fuel alcohol production and major portions of other critical technologies. Due to a lack of explosives, some warheads were simply filled with concrete, using the kinetic energy alone for destruction, and sometimes the warhead contained photographic propaganda of German citizens who had died in Allied bombings.

The psychological effect of the V-2 is disputed. The V-2, traveling faster than the speed of sound, gave no warning before impact (unlike bombing planes or the V-1 flying bomb, which made a characteristic buzzing sound). There was no effective defence and no risk of pilot or crew casualties. An example of the impression it made is in the reaction of American pilot and future nuclear strategist and Congressional aide William L. Borden, who in November 1944 while returning from a nighttime air mission over Holland saw a V-2 in flight on its way to strike London: "It resembled a meteor, streaming red sparks and whizzing past us as though the aircraft were motionless. I became convinced that it was only a matter of time until rockets would expose the United States to direct, transoceanic attack." However, historian Michael J. Neufeld writes that the missile was "unimpressive", arguing that the lack of noise meant it created less terror than the V-1, and the lack of effective defences means that the Allies expended much fewer resources in trying to counter it. Outside of a few areas most targeted for attacks, the missile was "little more than a nuisance".

With the war all but lost, regardless of the factory output of conventional weapons, the Nazis resorted to V-weapons as a tenuous last hope to influence the war militarily (hence Antwerp as V-2 target), as an extension of their desire to "punish" their foes and most importantly to give hope to their sympathizers with their miracle weapon. A post-war analysis by the British War Office was scathing: the V-2 specification "was conceived not for the carrying out of any deeply laid strategic plan for the bombardment of England or any other country, or indeed with any clearly defined application in view. It was merely conceived as a 'super gun', which would impress those in the highest places".

The V-2 did not affect the outcome of the war, but it resulted in the development of the intercontinental ballistic missiles of the Cold War, which were also used for space exploration.

== Unfulfilled plans ==
A submarine-towed launch platform was tested successfully, making it the prototype for submarine-launched ballistic missiles. The project codename was Prüfstand XII ("Test stand XII"), sometimes termed the rocket U-boat. If deployed, it would have allowed a U-boat to launch V-2 missiles against United States cities, though only with considerable effort (and limited effect). Hitler, in July 1944, and Speer, in January 1945, made speeches alluding to the scheme, though Germany did not possess the capability to fulfill these threats.

While interned after the war by the British at CSDIC camp 11, Dornberger was recorded saying that he had begged the Führer to stop the V-weapon propaganda, because nothing more could be expected from one ton of explosive. To this Hitler had replied that Dornberger might not expect more, but he (Hitler) certainly did.

According to decrypted messages from the Japanese embassy in Germany, twelve dismantled V-2 rockets were shipped to Japan. These left Bordeaux in August 1944 on the transport U-boats U-219 and U-195, which reached Jakarta in December 1944. A civilian V-2 expert was a passenger on U-234, bound for Japan in May 1945 when the war ended in Europe. The fate of these V-2 rockets is unknown.

== Post-war use ==
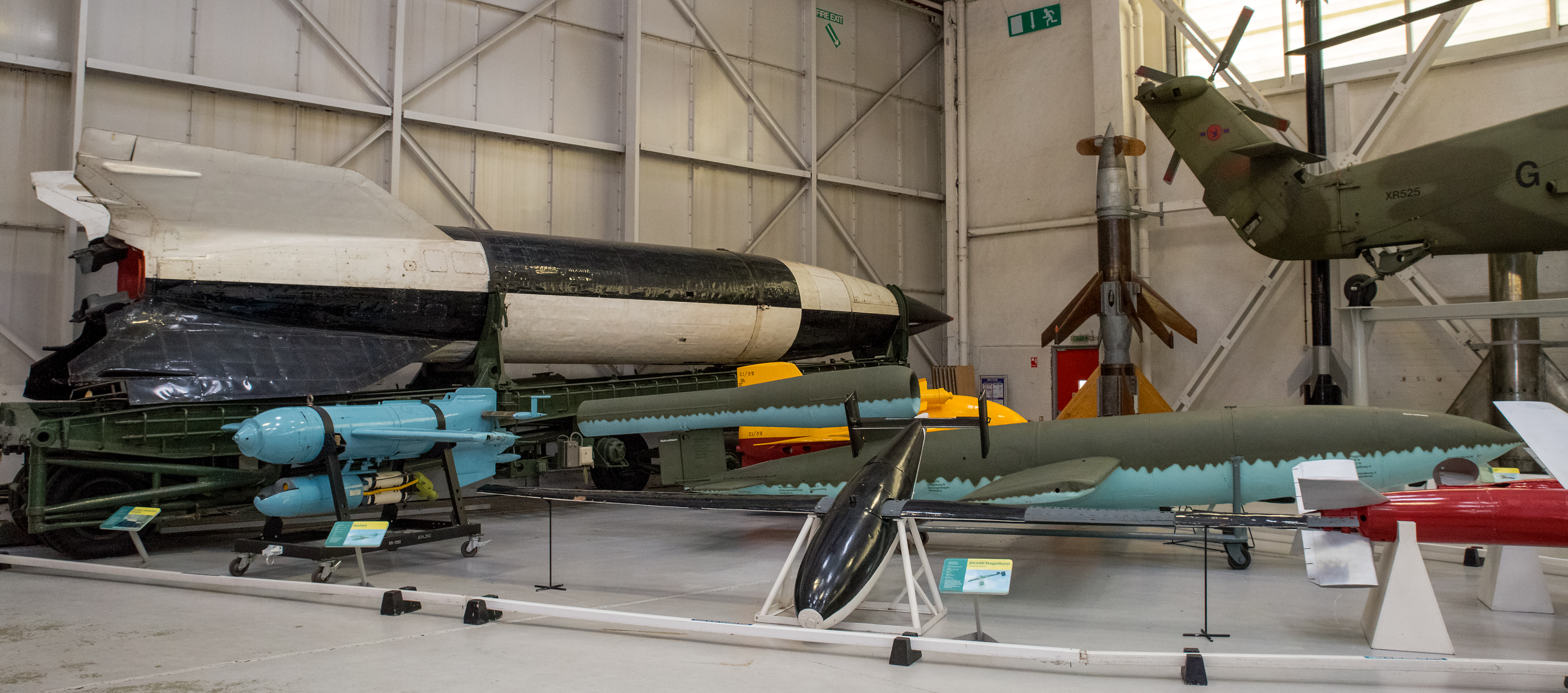
V-2 Rocket in Cosford Museum

At the end of the war, a competition began between the United States and the USSR to retrieve as many V-2 rockets and staff as possible. Three hundred rail-car loads of V-2s and parts were captured and shipped to the United States and 126 of the principal designers, including Wernher von Braun and Walter Dornberger, were captives of the Americans. Von Braun, his brother Magnus von Braun, and seven others decided to surrender to the United States military (Operation Paperclip) to ensure they were not captured by the advancing Soviets or shot dead by the Nazis to prevent their capture.

After the Nazi defeat, German engineers were relocated to the United States, the USSR, France and the United Kingdom where they further developed the V-2 rocket for military and civilian purposes. The V-2 rocket also laid the foundation for the liquid fuel missiles and space launchers used later.

=== United States ===
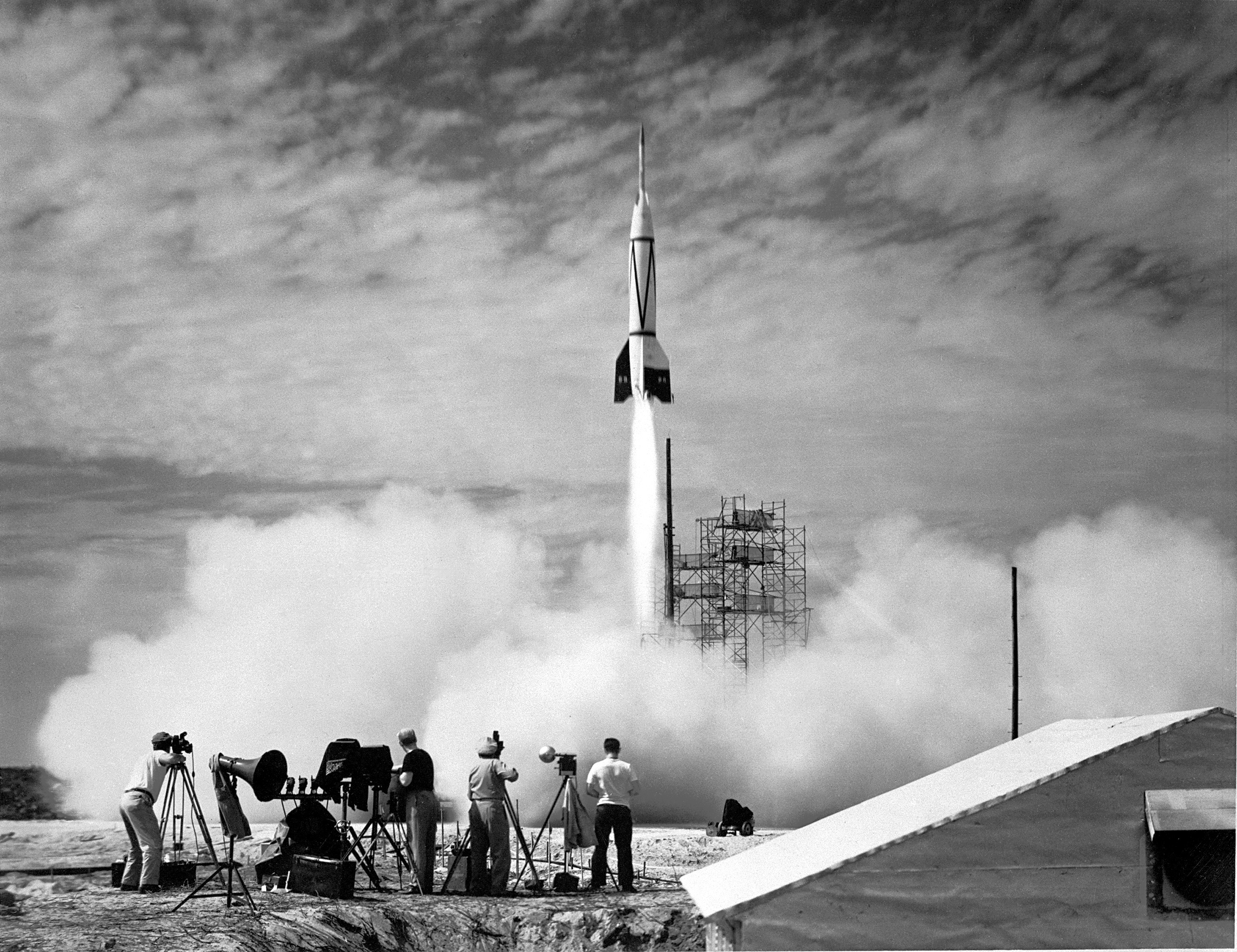
US test launch of a Bumper V-2

Operation Paperclip recruited German engineers and Special Mission V-2 transported the captured V-2 parts to the United States. At the close of the Second World War, more than 300 rail cars filled with V-2 engines, fuselages, propellant tanks, gyroscopes, and associated equipment were brought to the railyards in Las Cruces, New Mexico, so they could be placed on trucks and driven to the White Sands Proving Grounds, also in New Mexico.

In addition to V-2 hardware, the US Government delivered German mechanization equations for the V-2 guidance, navigation, and control systems, as well as for advanced development concept vehicles, to US defence contractors for analysis. During the 1950s, some of these documents were useful to US contractors in developing direction cosine matrix transformations and other inertial navigation architecture concepts that were applied to early US programs, such as the Atlas and Minuteman guidance systems as well as the Navy's Subs Inertial Navigation System.

A committee was formed with military and civilian scientists to review payload proposals for the reassembled V-2 rockets. By January 1946, the US Army Ordnance Corps invited civilian scientists and engineers to participate in developing a space research program using the V-2. The committee was initially named the "V-2 Rocket Panel", then the "V-2 Upper Atmosphere Research Panel", and finally the "Upper Atmosphere Rocket Research Panel". This resulted in an eclectic array of experiments that flew on V-2s and helped prepare for American manned space exploration. Devices were sent aloft to sample the air at all levels to determine atmospheric pressures and to see what gases were present. Other instruments measured the level of cosmic radiation.

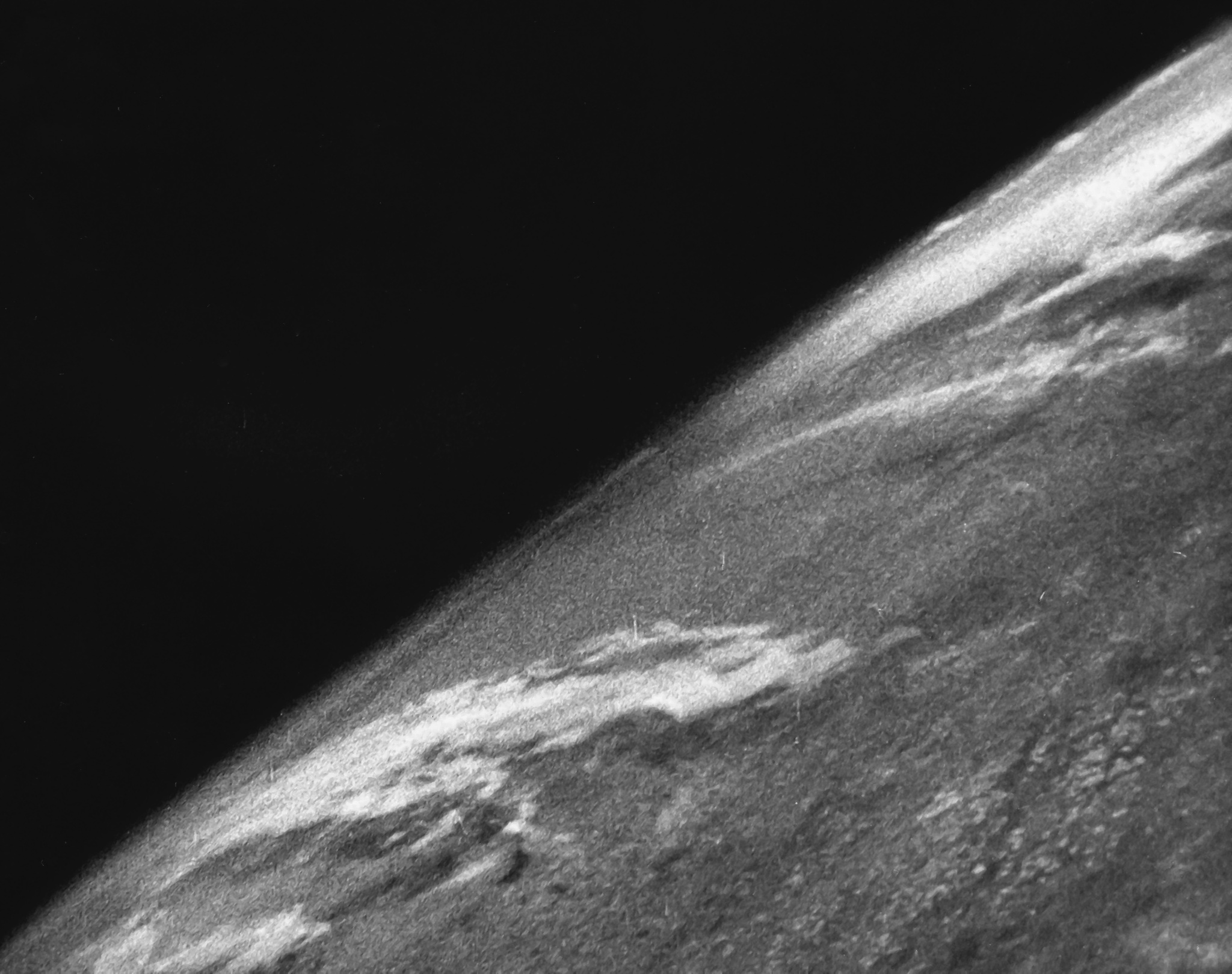
The first photo of Earth from space was taken from V-2 No. 13 launched by US scientists on 24 October 1946.

Only 68 percent of the V-2 trials were considered successful. On 29 May 1947, a Modified V-2 had an error in its guidance, and landed near Juarez, Mexico, causing an international incident.

The US Navy attempted to launch a German V-2 rocket at sea—one test launch from the aircraft carrier USS Midway was performed on 6 September 1947 as part of the Navy's Operation Sandy. The test launch was a partial success; the V-2 went off the pad but splashed down in the ocean only some 10 km (6 mi) from the carrier. The launch setup on the Midway's deck is notable in that it used foldaway arms to prevent the missile from falling over. The arms pulled away just after the engine ignited, releasing the missile. The setup may look similar to the R-7 Semyorka launch procedure but in the case of the R-7 the trusses hold the full weight of the rocket, rather than just reacting to side forces.

The PGM-11 Redstone rocket is a direct descendant of the V-2.

=== USSR ===
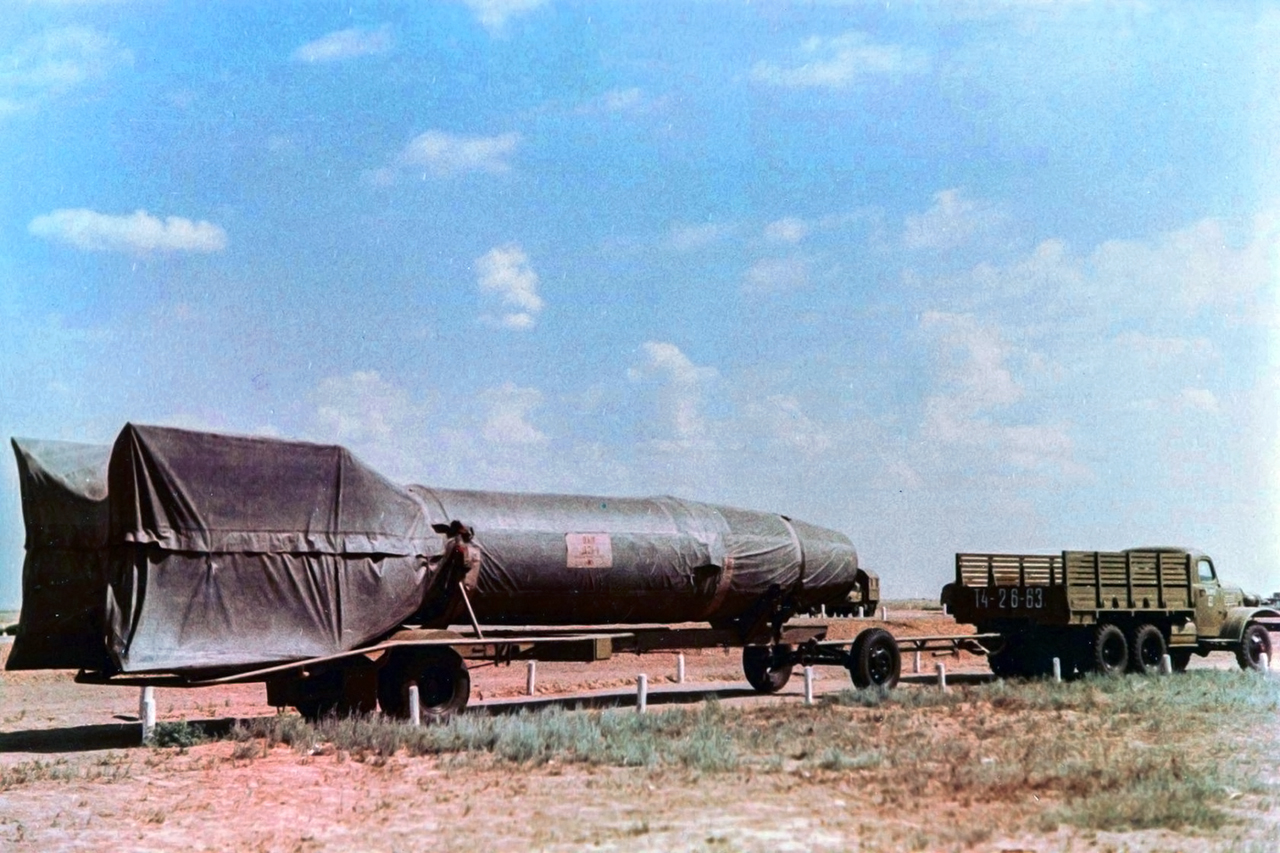
R-1 rocket (V-2 rebuilt by the Soviet Union) on a Vidalwagen at Kapustin Yar

The USSR captured a number of V-2s and staff, letting them stay in Germany for a time. The first work contracts were signed in the middle of 1945. During October 1946 (as part of Operation Osoaviakhim) they were obliged to relocate to Branch 1 of NII-88 on Gorodomlya Island in Lake Seliger where Helmut Gröttrup directed a group of 150 engineers. In October 1947, a group of German scientists supported the USSR in launching rebuilt V-2s in Kapustin Yar. The German team was indirectly overseen by Sergei Korolev, one of the leaders of the Soviet rocketry program.

The first Soviet missile was the R-1, a duplicate of the V-2 manufactured completely in the USSR, which was launched first during October 1948. From 1947 until the end of 1950, the German team elaborated concepts and improvements for extended payload and range for the projects G-1, G-2 and G-4. The German team had to remain on Gorodomlya island until as late as 1952 and 1953. In parallel, Soviet work emphasized larger missiles, the R-2 and R-5, based on further developing the V-2 technology with using ideas of the German concept studies. Details of Soviet achievements were unknown to the German team and completely underestimated by Western intelligence until, in November 1957, the satellite Sputnik 1 was launched successfully to orbit by the Sputnik rocket based on R-7, the world's first intercontinental ballistic missile.

=== France ===
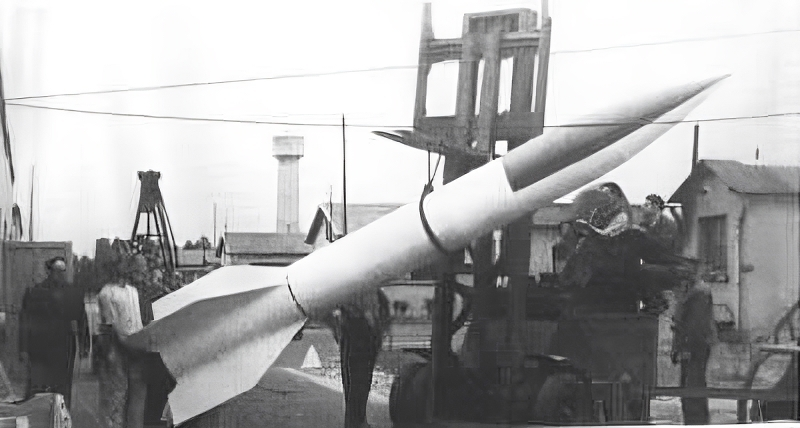
Véronique R rocket, derived from the Super-V2 program, c. 1950

Between May and September 1946, CEPA, the forerunner to today's French space agency CNES, undertook the recruitment of approximately thirty German engineers, who had previous experience working on rocket programs for Nazi Germany at the Peenemünde Army Research Center. Much like their counterparts in the United Kingdom, the United States, and the Soviet Union, France's objective was to acquire and advance the rocket technology developed by Germany during World War II. The initial initiative, known as the Super V-2 program, had plans for four rocket variants capable of achieving ranges of up to 3,600 km (2,200 mi) and carrying warheads weighing up to 1,000 kg (2,200 lb). However, this program was canceled in 1948.

From 1950 to 1969, the research done on the Super V-2 program was repurposed to develop the Véronique sounding rocket, which became the first liquid-fuel research rocket in Western Europe and was ultimately capable of carrying a 100 kg (220 lb) payload to an altitude of 320 km (200 mi). The Véronique program then led to the Diamant rocket and the Ariane rocket family.

=== UK ===
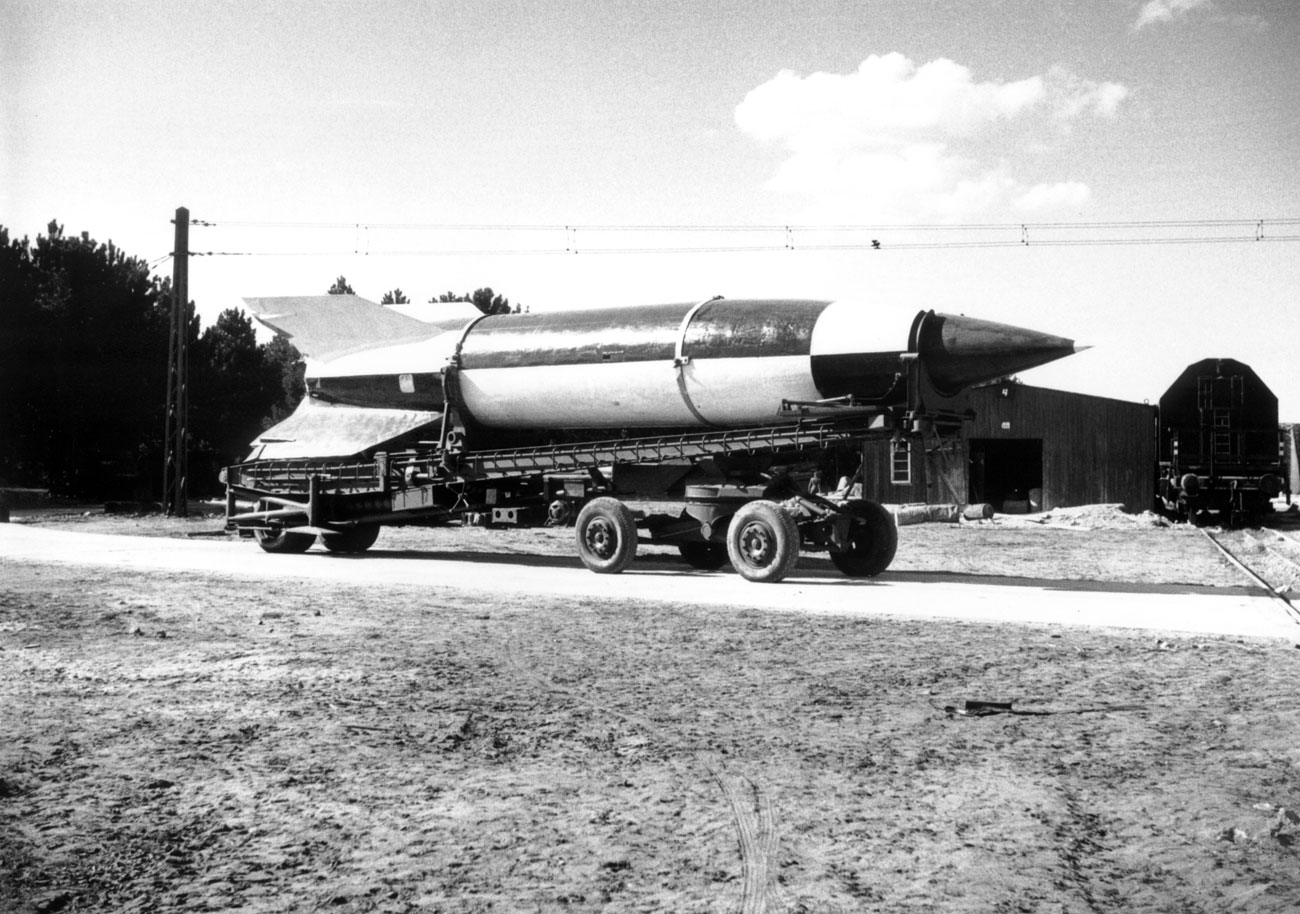
Operation Backfire V-2 rocket on Meillerwagen

During October 1945, the Allied Operation Backfire assembled a small number of V-2 missiles and launched three of them from a site in northern Germany. The engineers involved had already agreed to relocate to the US when the test firings were complete. The Backfire report, published in January 1946, contains extensive technical documentation of the rocket, including all support procedures, tailored vehicles and fuel composition.

In 1946, the British Interplanetary Society proposed an enlarged man-carrying version of the V-2, named Megaroc. It could have enabled sub-orbital spaceflight similar to, but at least a decade earlier than, the Mercury-Redstone flights of 1961.

=== China ===
The first Chinese Dongfeng missile, the DF-1 was a licensed copy of the Soviet R-2; this design was produced during the 1960s.

== Surviving V-2 examples and components ==
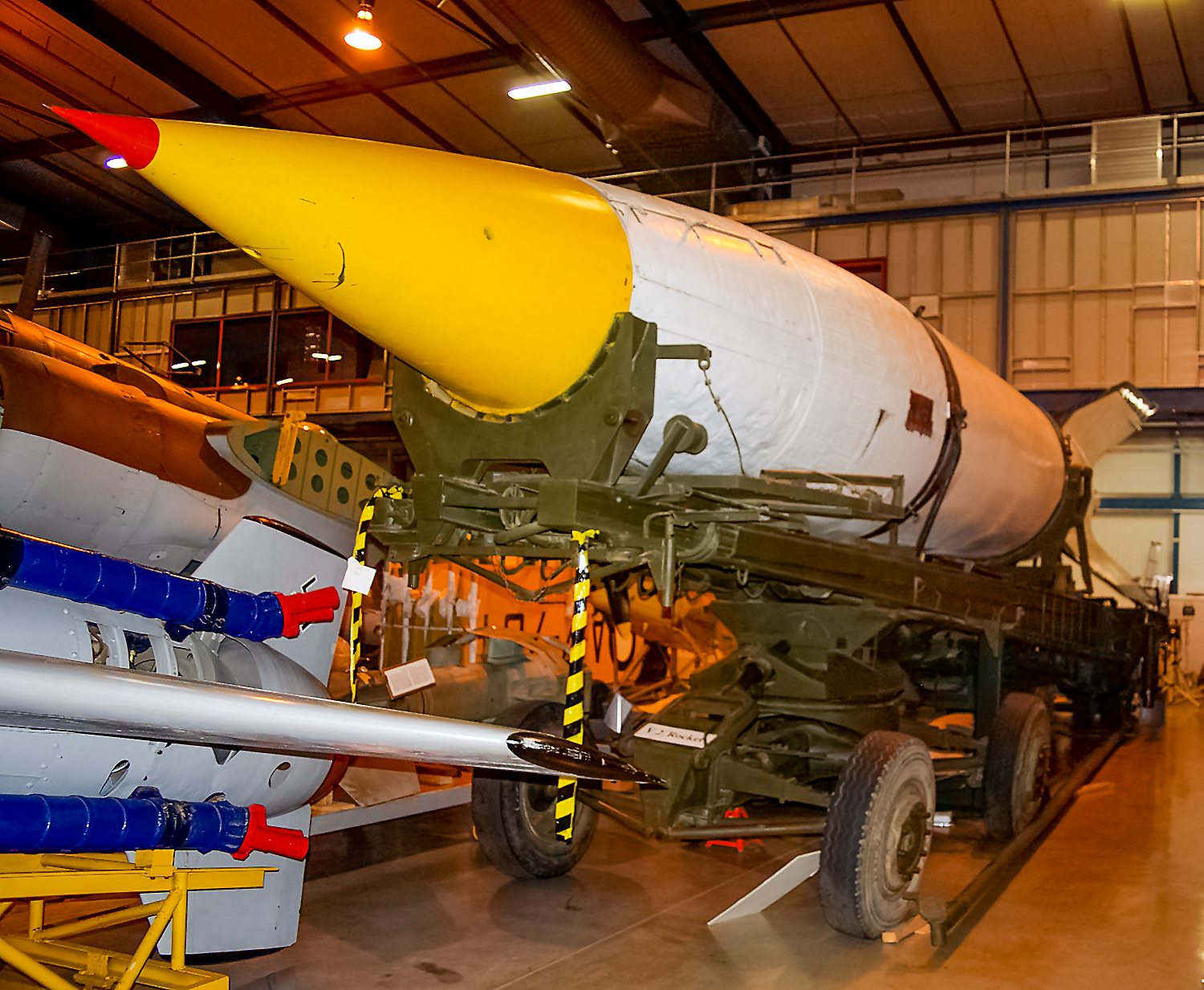
V-2 rocket located at the Australian War Memorial Treloar Centre Annex

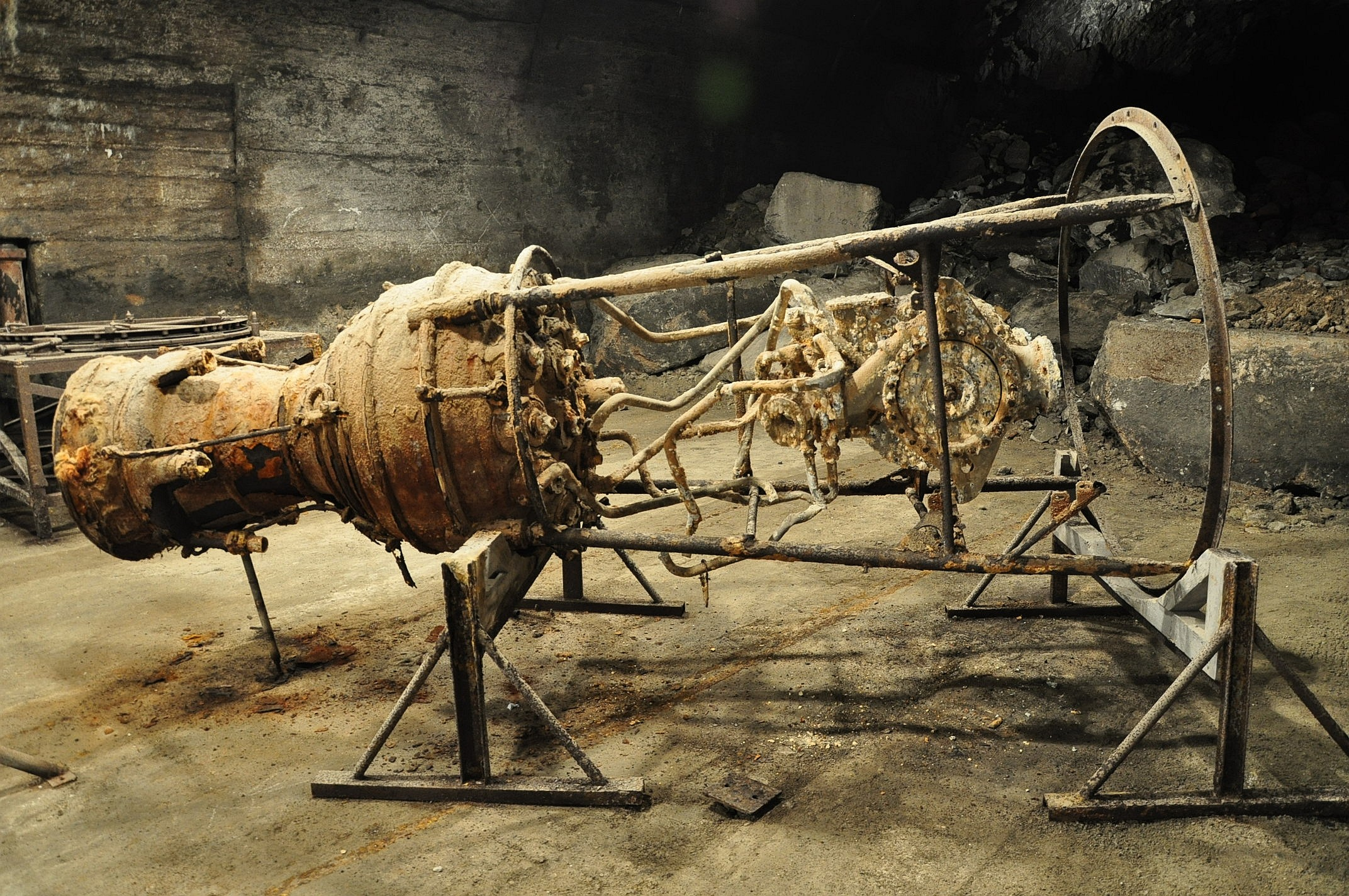
A rusty V-2 engine in the original underground production facilities at the Dora-Mittelbau concentration camp memorial site

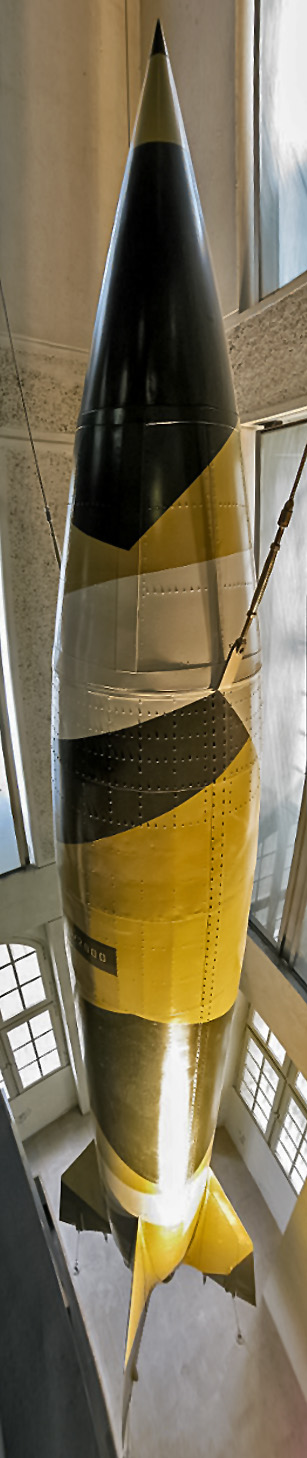
V-2 on display in Musée de l'Armée, Paris

At least 20 V-2s still existed during 2014.

=== Australia ===
- One at the Australian War Memorial, Canberra, including a complete Meillerwagen transporter. The rocket has the most complete set of guidance components of all surviving A4s. The Meillerwagen is the most complete of the three examples known to exist. Another A4 was on display at the RAAF Museum at Point Cook outside Melbourne. Both rockets are now in Canberra.

=== Netherlands ===
- One example, partly skeletonized, is in the collection of the Nationaal Militair Museum. In this collection are also a launching table and some loose parts, as well as the remains of a V-2 that crashed in The Hague immediately after launch.

=== Poland ===
- Several large components, including the hydrogen peroxide tank and reaction chamber, the propellant turbopump and the HWK rocket engine chamber (partly cut-out) are displayed at the Polish Aviation Museum in Kraków.
- A reconstruction of a V-2 missile containing multiple original recovered parts is on display at the Armia Krajowa Museum in Kraków.

=== France ===
- One engine at Cité de l'espace in Toulouse.
- V-2 display including engine, parts, rocket body and many documents and photographs relating to its development and use at La Coupole museum, Wizernes, Pas de Calais.
- One rocket body with no engine, one complete engine, one lower engine section and one wrecked engine on display in museum La Coupole.
- One engine complete with steering pallets, feed lines and tank bottoms, plus one cut-out thrust chamber and one cut-out turbopump at the Snecma (Space Engines Div.) museum in Vernon.
- One complete rocket in WWII wing of the Musée de l'Armée (Army Museum) in Paris.

=== Germany ===
- One complete V-2 rocket and several engines at the Deutsches Museum in Munich.
- One engine at the German Museum of Technology in Berlin.
- One engine at the Deutsches Historisches Museum in Berlin.
- One engine in the German Space Travel Exhibition in Morgenröthe-Rautenkranz.
- One rusty engine in the original V-2 underground production facilities at the Dora-Mittelbau concentration camp memorial site.
- One rusty engine in Buchenwald concentration camp.
- One replica was constructed for the Historical and Technical Information Centre in Peenemünde, where it is displayed near what remains of the factory where it was built.

=== United Kingdom ===
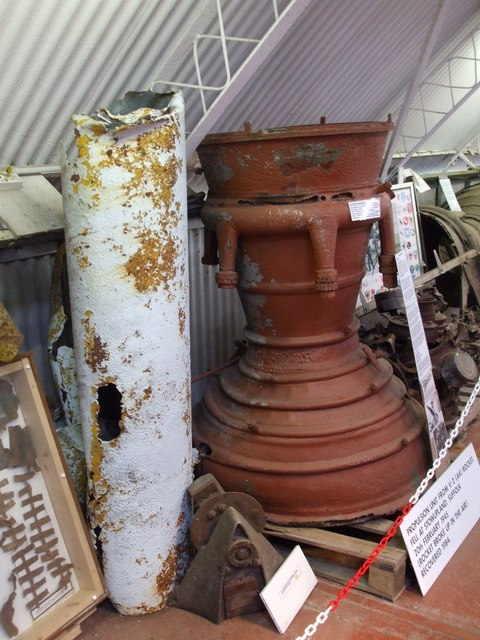
The propulsion unit from a V-2 that broke up in air on display (with exhaust-exit pointed up) Norfolk and Suffolk Aviation Museum

- One at the Science Museum, London.
- One, at the Imperial War Museum, London.
- The RAF Museum possesses two rockets, one of which is displayed at its Cosford site. The Museum also owns a Meillerwagen, a Vidalwagen, a Strabo crane, and a firing table with towing dolly.
- One at the Royal Engineers Museum in Chatham, Kent.
- A propulsion unit (minus injectors) is in Norfolk and Suffolk Aviation Museum near Bungay.
- A complete turbo-pump is at Solway Aviation Museum, Carlisle Airport as part of the Blue Streak Rocket exhibition.
- The venturi segment of a V-2 discovered in April 2012 was donated to the Harwich Sailing Club after it was found buried in a mudflat.
- Fuel combustion chamber recovered from the sea near Clacton at the East Essex Aviation Museum, St Oysth.
- A gyroscope unit, a turbo pump unit and a steam generating chamber are on display at the National Space Centre in Leicester.

=== United States ===
Complete missiles

- One at the Flying Heritage Collection, Everett, Washington
- One at the National Museum of the United States Air Force, including complete Meillerwagen, Dayton, Ohio.
- One (checkerboard-painted) at the Cosmosphere in Hutchinson, Kansas.
- One at the National Air and Space Museum, Washington, D.C.
- One at the Fort Bliss Air Defense Museum, El Paso, Texas.
- One (yellow and black) at Missile Park, White Sands Missile Range in White Sands, New Mexico.
- One at Marshall Space Flight Center in Huntsville, Alabama.
- One at the US Space & Rocket Center in Huntsville, Alabama.

Components

- One engine at the Stafford Air & Space Museum in Weatherford, Oklahoma.
- One engine at the US Space & Rocket Center in Huntsville, Alabama.
- Two engines at the National Museum of the United States Air Force. (one was transferred from United States Army Ordnance Museum in Aberdeen, Maryland in about 2005 when the museum closed).
- Combustion chambers and other components plus a US-built engine at the Steven F. Udvar-Hazy Center in Dulles, Virginia.
- One engine at the Museum of Science and Industry in Chicago.
- One rocket body at Picatinny Arsenal in Dover, New Jersey.
- One engine in the Auburn University Engineering Laboratory in Auburn, Alabama.
- One engine in the Exhibit Hall adjacent to the Blockhouse building on the Historic Cape Canaveral Tour in Cape Canaveral, Florida.
- One engine at Parks College of Engineering, Aviation and Technology in St. Louis, Missouri.
- One engine and tail section at New Mexico Museum of Space History in Alamogordo, New Mexico.

== See also ==
- Gravity's Rainbow – 1973 novel by Thomas Pynchon
- Wasserfall – German surface-to-air missile
- Rheinbote
- V-3 cannon
