= Zipf =

Zipf is a surname. Notable people with the surname include:

- Andy Zipf, American singer-songwriter
- George Kingsley Zipf (1902–1950), American linguist and philologist noted for Zipf's law
- Christoph Zipf (born 1962), professional tennis player from Germany
- Jonathan Zipf (born 1986), German triathlete

== See also ==
- Redl-Zipf
