= Operation Paperclip =

Secret post-WWII United States program

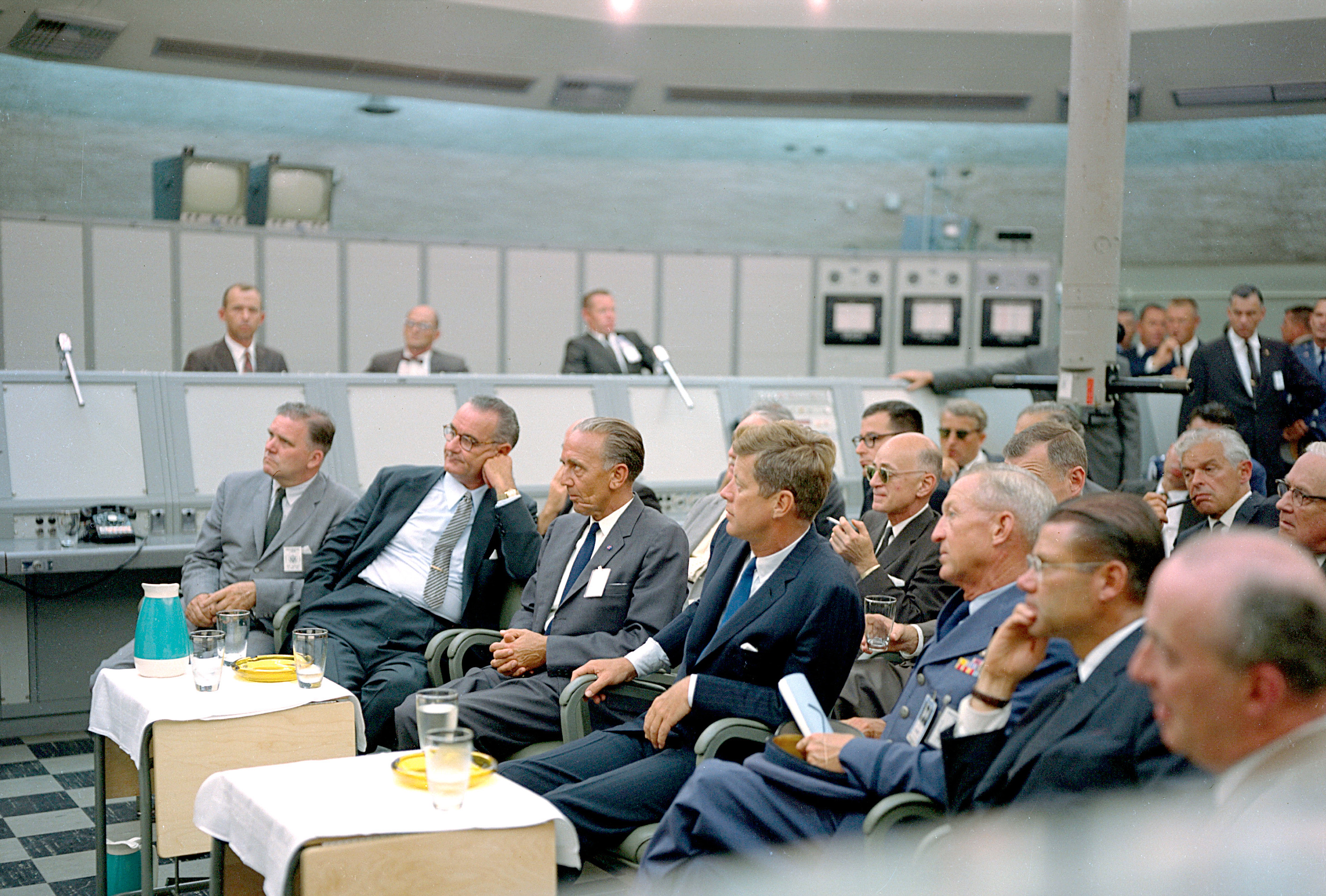
Kurt Debus (front row, third from the left), a former V-2 rocket scientist and SS officer who became a NASA director, sitting between US president John F. Kennedy and US vice president Lyndon B. Johnson in 1962 at a briefing at Blockhouse 34, Cape Canaveral Missile Test Annex

Operation Paperclip was a secret United States intelligence program in which more than 1,600 German scientists, engineers, and technicians were taken from former Nazi Germany to the US between 1945 and 1959 for government employment after the end of World War II in Europe; several were confirmed to be former members of the Nazi Party, including the SS or the SA.

The effort began in earnest in 1945, as the Allies advanced into Germany and discovered a wealth of scientific talent and advanced research that had contributed to Germany's wartime technological advancements. The US Joint Chiefs of Staff officially established Operation Overcast (operations "Overcast" and "Paperclip" were related, and the terms are often used interchangeably) on July 20, 1945, with the dual aims of leveraging German expertise for the ongoing war effort against Japan and to bolster US postwar military research. The operation, conducted by the Joint Intelligence Objectives Agency (JIOA), was largely actioned by special agents of the US Army's Counterintelligence Corps (CIC). Many selected scientists were involved in the Nazi rocket program, aviation, or chemical/biological warfare. The Soviet Union in the following year conducted a similar program, called Operation Osoaviakhim, that emphasized many of the same fields of research.

The operation, characterized by the recruitment of German specialists and their families, relocated more than 1500 experts to the US. It has been valued at $10 billion USD in patents and industrial processes. Recruits included such notable figures as Wernher von Braun, a leading rocket-technology scientist. Those recruited were instrumental in the development of the US space program and military technology during the Cold War. Despite its contributions to American scientific advances, Operation Paperclip has been controversial because of the Nazi affiliations of many recruits, and the ethics of assimilating individuals associated with war crimes into American society.

The operation was not solely focused on rocketry; it also transferred expertise in aerodynamics, aviation medicine, and related military research. Its technological legacy was especially visible in the transformation of German V-2 rocket technology into later American missile and launch systems. After moving to Redstone Arsenal in 1950, Wernher von Braun’s team developed the Redstone and Jupiter missiles. When this group was transferred to the National Aeronautics and Space Administration (NASA) in 1960, it became central to the work of the Marshall Space Flight Center and the development of the Saturn launch vehicles used in the Apollo program. The related Mercury-Redstone rocket also carried Alan Shepard on the first American human spaceflight.

In aeronautics, German high-speed flight research and aerodynamic knowledge contributed to postwar American aircraft and missile development. In aviation medicine, German specialists contributed to early space medicine research in the United States, including studies on weightlessness, life-support systems, and human performance in extreme conditions.

Operation Paperclip was part of a broader strategy by the US to harness German scientific talent in the face of emerging Cold War tensions, and ensure this expertise did not fall into the hands of the Soviet Union or other nations. The operation's legacy has remained controversial in subsequent decades.

== Background and Operation Overcast ==
In February 1945, Supreme Headquarters Allied Expeditionary Force (SHAEF) set up T-Force, or Special Sections Subdivision, which grew to over 2,000 personnel by June. T-Force examined 5,000 German targets, seeking expertise in synthetic rubber and oil catalysts, new designs in armored equipment, V-2 (rocket) weapons, jet and rocket propelled aircraft, naval equipment, field radios, secret writing chemicals, aero medicine research, gliders, and "scientific and industrial personalities".

When large numbers of German scientists began to be discovered by the advancing Allied forces in late April 1945, the Special Sections Subdivision set up the Enemy Personnel Exploitation Section to manage and interrogate them. The Enemy Personnel Exploitation Section established a detention center, Camp Dustbin, first near Paris and later in Kransberg Castle outside Frankfurt. The US Joint Chiefs of Staff (JCS) established the first secret recruitment program, called Operation Overcast, on July 20, 1945, initially "to assist in shortening the Japanese war and to aid our postwar military research". The term "Overcast" was the name first given by the German scientists' family members for the housing camp where they were held in Bavaria. In late summer 1945, the JCS established the JIOA, a subcommittee of the Joint Intelligence Community, to directly oversee Operation Overcast and later Operation Paperclip. The JIOA representatives included the army's director of intelligence, the chief of naval intelligence, the assistant chief of Air Staff-2 (air force intelligence), and a representative from the State Department. In November 1945, Operation Overcast was renamed Operation Paperclip by Ordnance Corps officers, who would attach a paperclip to the folders of those rocket experts whom they wished to employ in the United States.

The project was not initially targeted against the Soviet Union; rather the concern was that German scientists might emigrate and continue their research in countries that remained neutral during the war. Much US effort was focused on Saxony and Thuringia, which on July 1, 1945, became part of the Soviet occupation zone. Many German research facilities and personnel had been evacuated to these states before the end of the war, particularly from the Berlin area. The USSR then relocated more than 2,200 German specialists and their families—more than 6,000 people—with Operation Osoaviakhim during one night on October 22, 1946.

In a secret directive circulated on September 3, 1946, President Truman officially approved Operation Paperclip and expanded it to include 1,000 German scientists under "temporary, limited military custody". News media revealed the program as early as December 1946.

On April 26, 1946, the Joint Chiefs of Staff issued directive JCS 1067/14 to General Eisenhower instructing that he "preserve from destruction and take under your control records, plans, books, documents, papers, files and scientific, industrial and other information and data belonging to ... German organizations engaged in military research"; and that, excepting war-criminals, German scientists be detained for intelligence purposes as required.

== Osenberg List ==
In the later part of World War II, Germany was at a logistical disadvantage, having failed to conquer the USSR with Operation Barbarossa (June–December 1941), and its drive for the Caucasus (June 1942 – February 1943). The failed conquest had depleted German resources, and its military–industrial complex was unprepared to defend the Greater Germanic Reich against the Red Army's westward counterattack. By early 1943, the German government began recalling from combat a number of scientists, engineers, and technicians to work in research and development to bolster German defense for a protracted war with the USSR. The recall from frontline combat included 4,000 rocketeers returned to Peenemünde, in northeast coastal Germany.

Overnight, Ph.D.s were liberated from KP duty, masters of science were recalled from orderly service, mathematicians were hauled out of bakeries, and precision mechanics ceased to be truck drivers.

— Dieter K. Huzel, Peenemünde to Canaveral

The Nazi government's recall of their now-useful intellectuals for scientific work first required identifying and locating the scientists, engineers, and technicians, then ascertaining their political and ideological reliability. Werner Osenberg, the engineer-scientist heading the Wehrforschungsgemeinschaft (Defense Research Association), recorded the names of the politically cleared men to the Osenberg List, thus reinstating them to scientific work.

In March 1945, at Bonn University, a Polish laboratory technician found pieces of the Osenberg List stuffed in a toilet; the list subsequently reached MI6, who transmitted it to US intelligence. Then US Army Major Robert B. Staver, Chief of the Jet Propulsion Section of the Research and Intelligence Branch of the United States Army Ordnance Corps, used the Osenberg List to compile his list of German scientists to be captured and interrogated; Wernher von Braun, Germany's best rocket scientist, headed Major Staver's list.

== Identification and Paperclip ==
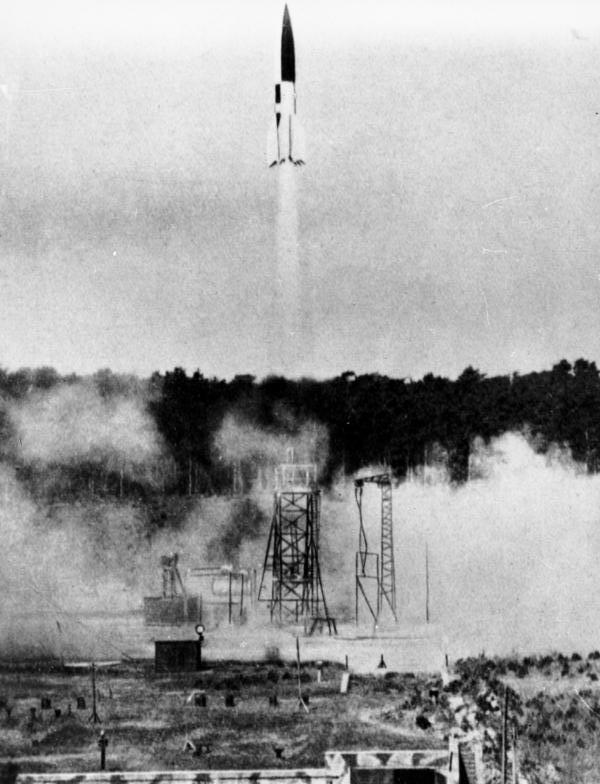
V-2 rocket launching, Peenemünde, on the north-east Baltic German coast (1943)

In Operation Overcast, Major Staver's original intent was only to interview the scientists, but what he learned changed the operation's purpose. On May 22, 1945, he transmitted to the US Department of War Colonel Joel Holmes' telegram urging the evacuation to America of 100 of the 400 German scientists in his custody, as most "important for [the] Pacific war" effort. Most of the Osenberg List engineers worked at the Baltic coast German Army Research Center Peenemünde, developing the V-2 rocket. After capturing them, the Allies initially housed them and their families in Landshut, Bavaria, in southern Germany.

Beginning on July 19, 1945, the US Joint Chiefs managed the captured ARC rocketeers under Operation Overcast. However, when the "Camp Overcast" name of the scientists' quarters became locally known, the program was renamed Operation Paperclip in November 1945. U.S. Air Force general Donald L. Putt led Operation Paperclip.

Despite these attempts at secrecy, the press interviewed several of the scientists later that year.

== Capture and detention ==
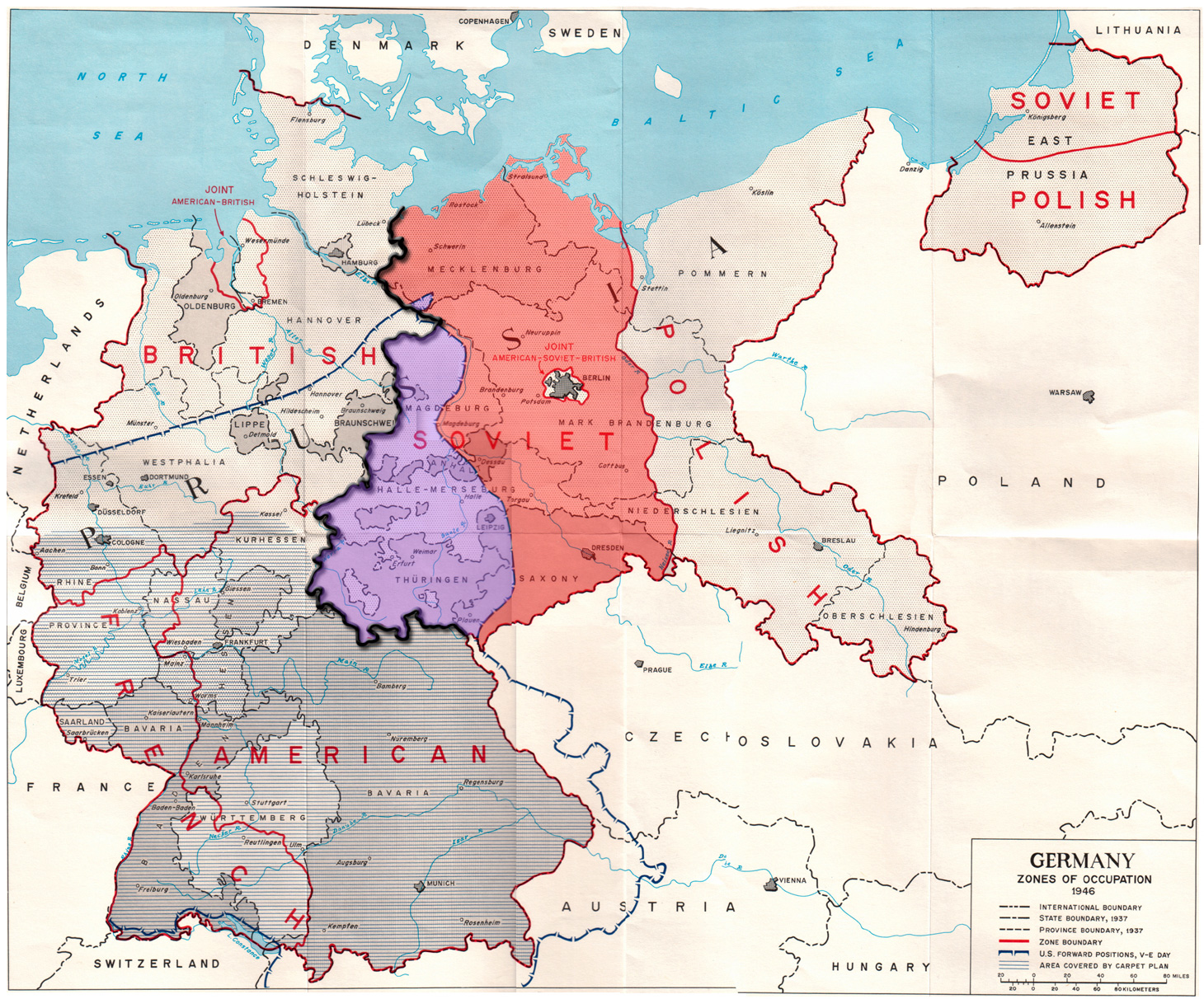
The Allied zones of occupation in post-war Germany, highlighting the Soviet zone (red), the inner German border (heavy black line), and the zone from which British and American troops withdrew in July 1945 (purple). The provincial boundaries are those of Nazi Germany, before the present Länder (federal states) were established.

Early on, the United States created the Combined Intelligence Objectives Subcommittee (CIOS). This provided the information on targets for the T-Forces that went in and targeted scientific, military, and industrial installations (and their employees) for their know-how. Initial priorities were advanced technology, such as infrared, that could be used in the war against Japan; finding out what technology had been passed on to Japan; and finally to halt research elsewhere.

Von Braun and more than a thousand of his colleagues decided to surrender to Americans in 1945. One of the engineers later recalled their options: "We despise the French, we are mortally afraid of the Soviets, we do not believe the British can afford us. So that leaves the Americans." On June 20, 1945, they moved from the east closer to the American forces, to avoid the advancing Soviet army.

A project to halt the research was codenamed "Project Safehaven"; it was not initially targeted against the Soviet Union but addressed the concern that German scientists might emigrate and continue their research in countries that had remained neutral during the war. To avoid the complications involved with the emigration of German scientists, the CIOS was responsible for scouting and kidnapping high-profile individuals to block technological advancements in nations hostile to the US.

Much US effort was focused on Saxony and Thuringia, which on July 1, 1945, would become part of the Soviet Occupation zone. Many German research facilities and personnel had been evacuated to these states, particularly from the Berlin area. Fearing that the Soviet takeover would limit US ability to exploit German scientific and technical expertise, and not wanting the Soviet Union to benefit from it, the United States instigated an "evacuation operation" of scientific personnel from Saxony and Thuringia, issuing orders such as:

On orders of Military Government you are to report with your family and baggage as much as you can carry tomorrow noon at 1300 hours (Friday, 22 June 1945) at the town square in Bitterfeld. There is no need to bring winter clothing. Easily carried possessions, such as family documents, jewelry, and the like should be taken along. You will be transported by motor vehicle to the nearest railway station. From there you will travel on to the West. Please tell the bearer of this letter how large your family is.

By 1947, this evacuation operation had netted an estimated 1,800 technicians and scientists and 3,700 family members. Those with special skills or knowledge were taken to detention and interrogation centers, such as one code-named "Dustbin" (located first at Chesnay, near Versailles and then moved to Kransberg Castle outside Frankfurt) to be held and interrogated, in some cases for months.

A few of the scientists were gathered as a part of Operation Overcast, but most were transported to villages in the countryside where there were neither research facilities nor work; they were provided with stipends, and required to report twice weekly to police headquarters to prevent them from leaving. The Joint Chiefs of Staff directive on research and teaching stated that technicians and scientists should be released "only after all interested agencies were satisfied that all desired intelligence information had been obtained from them".

On November 5, 1947, the Office of Military Government, United States (OMGUS), which had jurisdiction over the western part of occupied Germany, held a conference to consider the status of the evacuees, the monetary claims that the evacuees had filed against the United States, and the "possible violation by the US of laws of war or Rules of Land Warfare". The OMGUS director of Intelligence Robert L. Walsh initiated a program to resettle the evacuees in the Third World, which the Germans referred to as General Walsh's Urwald-Programm ("jungle program"); but the program was not carried out. In 1948, the evacuees received settlements of 69.5 million Reichsmarks from the US, a settlement that soon became severely devalued during the currency reform that introduced the Deutsche Mark as the official currency of western Germany.

John Gimbel concludes that the United States held some of Germany's best minds for three years, therefore depriving the German recovery of their expertise.

== Arrivals ==
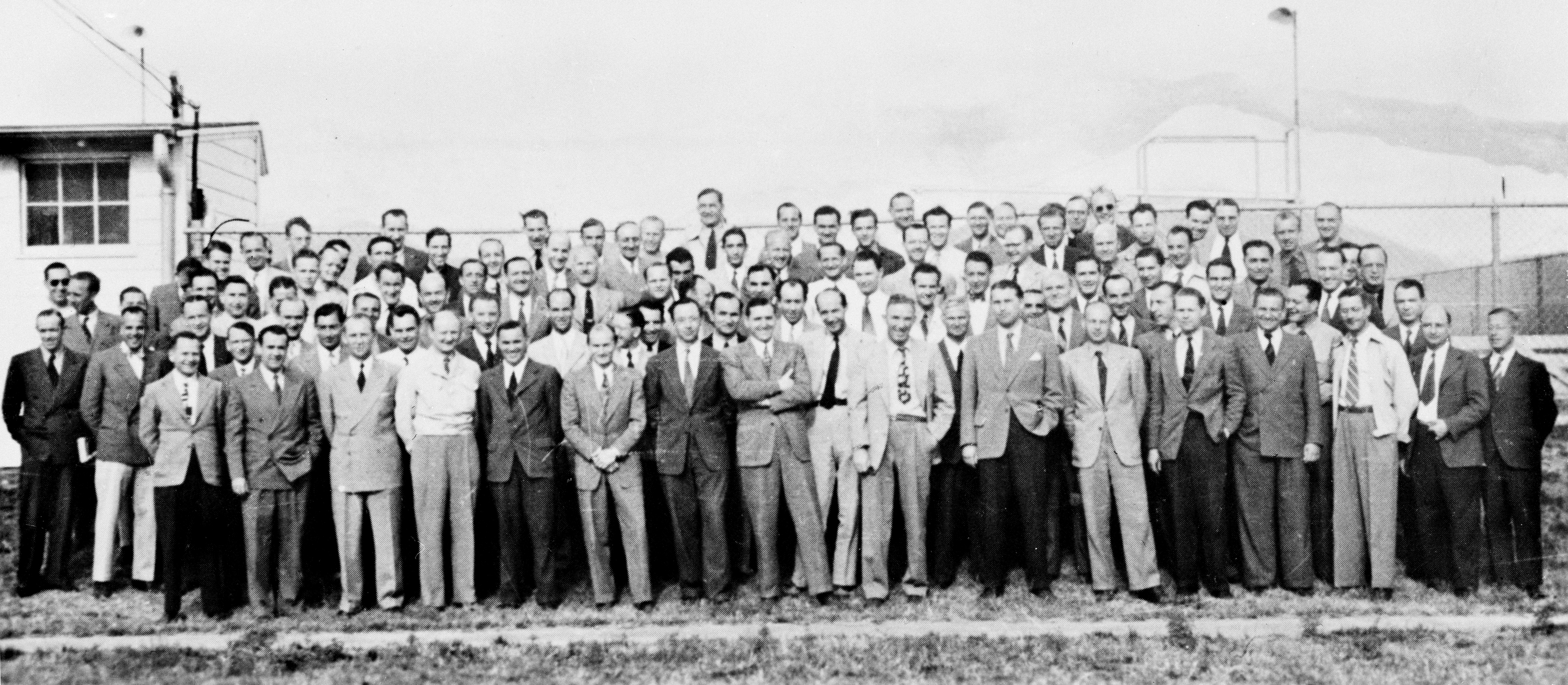
A group of 104 rocket scientists at Fort Bliss, Texas

In May 1945, the US Navy "received in custody" Herbert A. Wagner, the inventor of the Hs 293 missile; for two years, he first worked at the Special Devices Center, at Castle Gould and at Hempstead House, Long Island, New York; in 1947, he moved to the Naval Air Station Point Mugu.

In August 1945, Colonel Holger Toftoy, head of the Rocket Branch of the Research and Development Division of the US Army's Ordnance Corps, offered initial one-year contracts to the rocket scientists; 127 of them accepted. In September 1945, the first group of seven rocket scientists (aerospace engineers) arrived at Fort Strong on Long Island in Boston harbor: Wernher von Braun, Erich W. Neubert, Theodor A. Poppel, William August Schulze, Eberhard Rees, Wilhelm Jungert, and Walter Schwidetzky.

Beginning in late 1945, three rocket-scientist groups arrived in the United States for duty at Fort Bliss, Texas, and at White Sands Proving Grounds, New Mexico, as "War Department Special Employees".

In 1946, the United States Bureau of Mines employed seven German synthetic fuel scientists at a Fischer–Tropsch chemical plant in Louisiana, Missouri.

On June 1, 1949, the Chief of Ordnance of the United States Army designated Redstone Arsenal in Huntsville, Alabama, as the Ordnance Rocket Center, its facility for rocket research and development. On April 1, 1950, the Fort Bliss missile development operation, including von Braun and his team of over 130 Paperclip members, was transferred to Redstone Arsenal.

In early 1950, legal US residency for some of the Project Paperclip specialists was effected through the US consulate in Ciudad Juárez, Chihuahua, Mexico; thus, German scientists legally entered the United States from Latin America.

Between 1945 and 1952, the United States Air Force sponsored the largest number of Paperclip scientists, importing 260 men, of whom 36 returned to Germany, and one, Walter Schreiber, emigrated to Argentina.

The United States Army Signal Corps employed 24 specialists—including the physicists Georg Goubau, Gunter Guttwein, Georg Hass, Horst Kedesdy, and Kurt Lehovec; the physical chemists Rudolf Brill, Ernst Baars, and Eberhard Both; the geophysicist Helmut Weickmann; the optician Gerhard Schwesinger; and the engineers Eduard Gerber, Richard Guenther, and Hans Ziegler.

In 1959, 94 Operation Paperclip men went to the United States, including Friedwardt Winterberg and Friedrich Wigand.

Overall, through its operations to 1990, Operation Paperclip imported 1,600 men as part of the intellectual reparations owed to the US and the UK, valued at US$10 billion in patents and industrial processes.

== Major awards (in the United States) ==
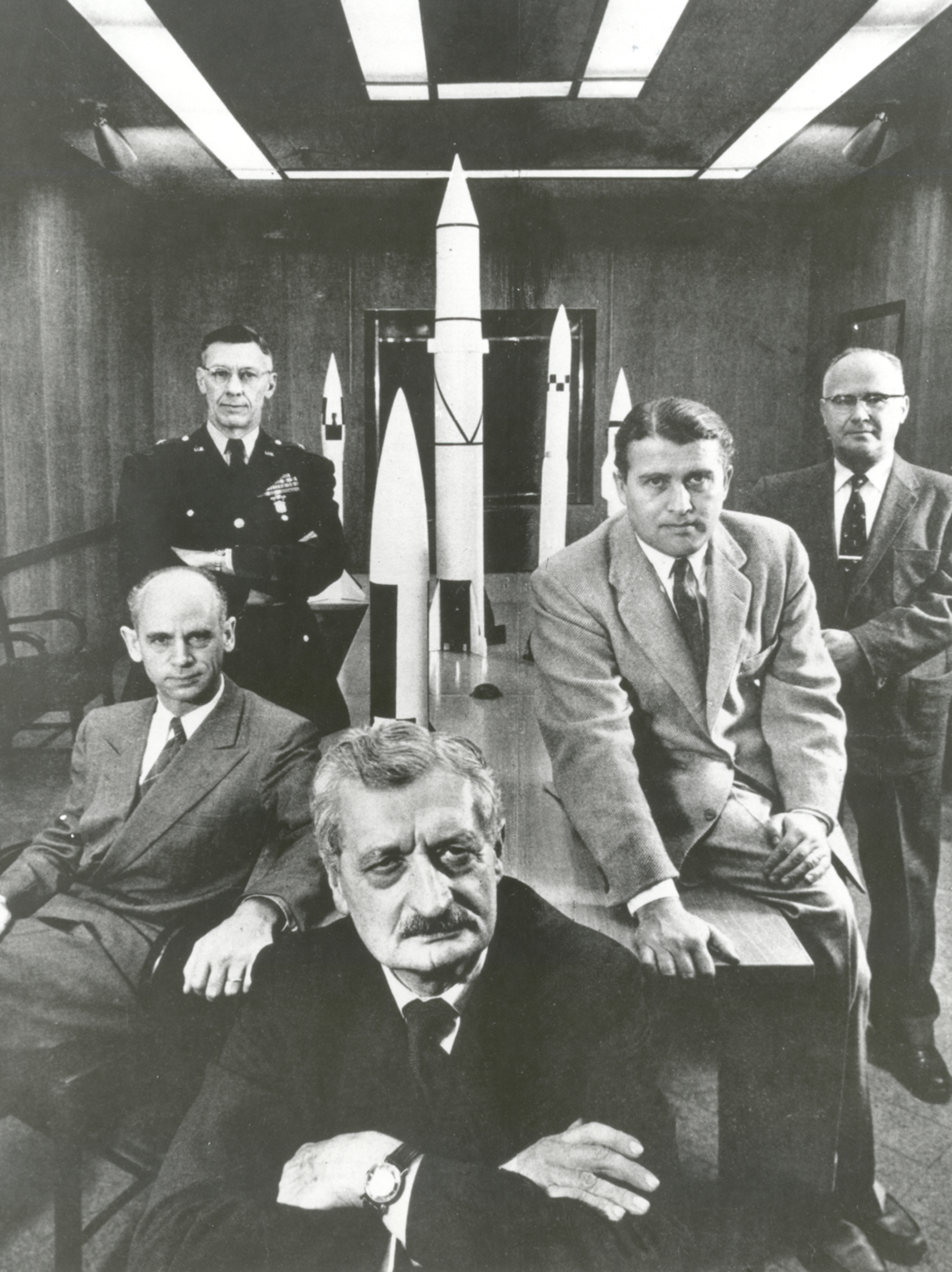
Hermann Oberth (forefront) with officials of the Army Ballistic Missile Agency at Huntsville, Alabama in 1956. Left to right around Oberth: Ernst Stuhlinger (seated), Major General Holger Toftoy, Commanding Officer responsible for "Project Paperclip", Wernher von Braun, Director, Development Operations Division, Robert Lusser, a Project Paperclip engineer.

The NASA Distinguished Service Medal is the highest award which may be bestowed by the National Aeronautics and Space Administration (NASA). After more than two decades of service and leadership in NASA, four Operation Paperclip members were awarded the NASA Distinguished Service Medal in 1969: Kurt Debus, Eberhard Rees, Arthur Rudolph, and Wernher von Braun. Ernst Geissler was awarded the medal in 1973.

The Department of Defense Distinguished Civilian Service Award is the highest civilian award given by the United States Department of Defense. After two decades of service, Siegfried Knemeyer was awarded the Department of Defense Distinguished Civilian Service Award in 1966.

The Goddard Astronautics Award is the highest honor bestowed for notable achievements in the field of astronautics by the American Institute of Aeronautics and Astronautics (AIAA). For their service, three Operation Paperclip members were awarded the Goddard Astronautics Award: Wernher von Braun (1961), Hans von Ohain (1966), and Krafft Arnold Ehricke (1984).

The US Space & Rocket Center in Huntsville, Alabama, owns and operates the US Space Camp. Several Operation Paperclip members are members of the Space Camp Hall of Fame (which began in 2007): Wernher von Braun (2007), Georg von Tiesenhausen (2007), and Oscar Holderer (2008).

The New Mexico Museum of Space History includes the International Space Hall of Fame. Two Operation Paperclip members are members of the International Space Hall of Fame: Wernher von Braun (1976) and Ernst Steinhoff (1979). Hubertus Strughold was inducted in 1978 but removed as a member in 2006. Other closely related members include Willy Ley (1976), a German-American science writer, and Hermann Oberth (1976), a German scientist who advised von Braun's rocket team in the US from 1955 to 1958; neither Ley, nor Oberth moved to the US via the Operation Paperclip.

Two lunar craters are named after Paperclip scientists: Debus after Kurt Debus, the first director of NASA's Kennedy Space Center, and von Braun.

== Advancements in aeronautics ==
=== Significant migrants ===
==== Adolf Busemann ====
Dr. Adolf Busemann was born in Lübeck, Germany, in 1902. He graduated from the Carolo Wilhelmina Technical University in Braunschweig and received a Ph.D. in engineering in 1924. In 1925, the Kaiser-Wilhelm Institute for Flow Research invited him to become an official aeronautical research scientist, and in 1930, he became a professor at Georgia Augusta University in Göttingen.

Busemann spent many years working for the German government, most notably directing research at the Braunschweig Laboratory. He gave a speech in 1935 at the Volta Congress, an international meeting on the problems of high-speed aeronautics. At this conference, he presented his first theory of how the angle of sweep of a plane wing reduces drag at supersonic speed. After the war, he traveled to the United States to assist them with the war tensions with Russia, where he continued his work on his theory of wing sweep.

==== Wernher von Braun ====
Wernher von Braun is known for developing rocket and space-flight technology, including the V-2 missile. In late 1932, he worked for the German army to develop new liquid propulsion-based missiles. He received a doctorate in physics in 1934 from the Friedrich-Wilhelms University of Berlin. He and his team then surrendered to the Allies at the end of World War II, shortly after Hitler's suicide in 1945. They were brought to America through Operation Paperclip and assimilated into NASA's space program, where they worked on missile technology at Fort Bliss before transferring to Huntsville, Alabama. He became the director of the Marshall Space Flight Center in 1960.

Von Braun is also a controversial figure for his involvement with the Nazi party and the slave labor involved in developing the V-2 rocket in Germany before it began to be developed in the United States. He became a member of the Nazi party in 1937 and was made a junior SS officer in 1940.

=== Marshall Space Flight Center ===
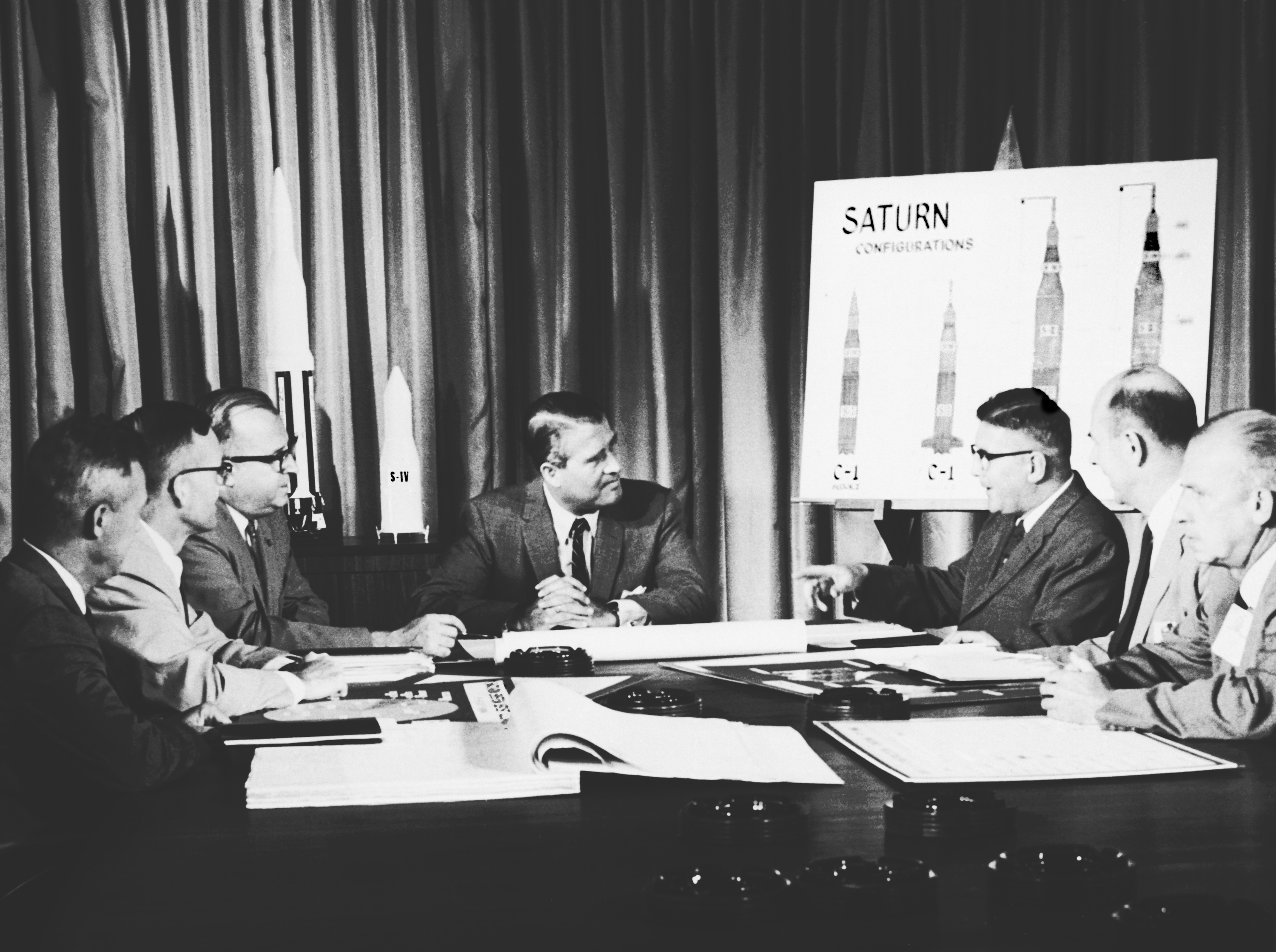
Wernher von Braun in 1961 with members of his management team. Pictured from left to right are, Werner Kuers, Director of the Manufacturing Engineering Division; Dr. Walter Häussermann, Director of the Astrionics Division; Dr. William Mrazek, Propulsion and Vehicle Engineering Division; Dr. von Braun; Dieter Grau, Director of the Quality Assurance Division; Dr. Oswald Lange, Director of the Saturn Systems Office; and Erich W. Neubert, Associate Deputy Director for Research and Development.

In July 1960, the National Aeronautics and Space Administration (NASA) established the Marshall Space Flight Center (MSFC) in Huntsville, Alabama after taking control of the Development Operations Division from the Army's Redstone Arsenal. The Redstone Arsenal was led by the Army Ballistic Missile Agency. Wernher von Braun became the first director of the MSFC. The MSFC's development team was formed by American engineers from the Redstone Arsenal and 118 German migrants who came from Peenemünde through Operation Paperclip. Von Braun worked with Operation Paperclip to get scientists from his team to the United States. They began work at Fort Bliss in El Paso, Texas in September 1945, and most of the team had arrived by 1946. Von Braun and his team worked as consultants for the military until 1950 when they began transferring to Huntsville.

Originally, the center focused on weaponry and further development of the V-2 rocket line but later became one of NASA's main development centers for space flight project. The team also worked on missions that related to Moon landing missions, such as the Lunar Roving Vehicle. However, the main projects from the Marshall Space Flight Center were the V-2 rocket and the Apollo missions.

==== V-2 rocket ====
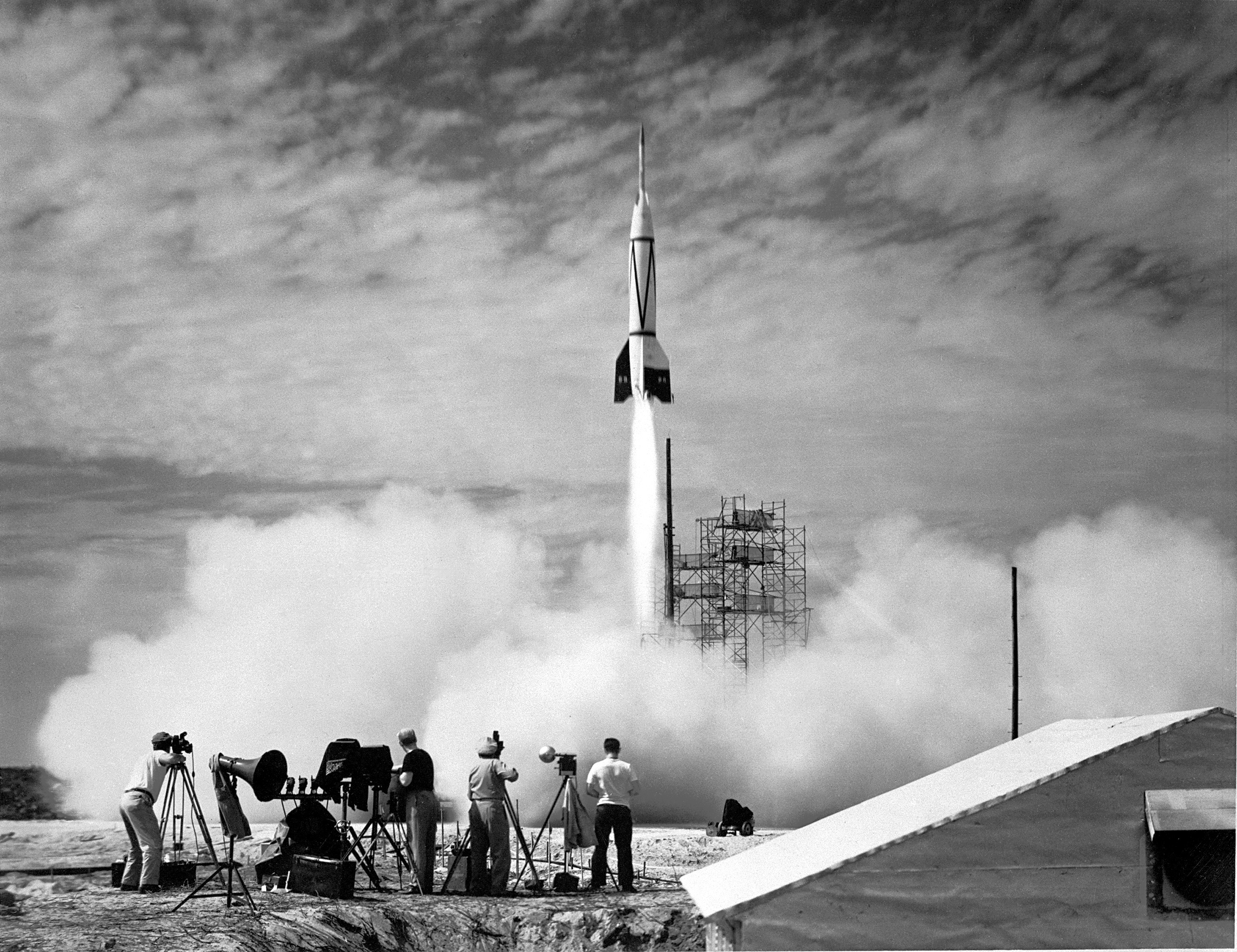
US test launch of a Bumper V-2, the first rocket launch from Cape Canaveral

The V-2 rocket was developed in Germany at the Peenemünde military research center. Wernher von Braun was the director of Peenemünde and worked with a team of engineers, physicists, and chemists. The Nazis used the V-2 missile during World War II to attack Paris, the port of Antwerp, and Great Britain, among many other targets. An estimated 9,000 civilians and military personnel died in these attacks. The location of V-2 production moved to Mittelwerk in Nordhausen after a British raid on Peenemünde on August 17, 1943. Mittelwerk was supplemented with slave labor from Dora, a nearby concentration camp.

Production of the V-2 missile moved to the United States after Wernher von Braun surrendered to the Allies (Hall 2022). In March 1946, a V-2 was test-fired in New Mexico, followed by the first launch of a captured V-2 in April of the same year. After months of adaptation, a V-2 missile was fired in White Sands Proving Ground, New Mexico that broke a record with an altitude of 116 miles (187 km). Known as V-2 sounding rockets, they were used to test the effects of cosmic rays on fruit flies and seeds. They also took the first pictures of Earth from 100 miles (160 km) in the air (high enough to show the curvature of the planet), and tested g-force on various monkeys.

==== Apollo missions ====
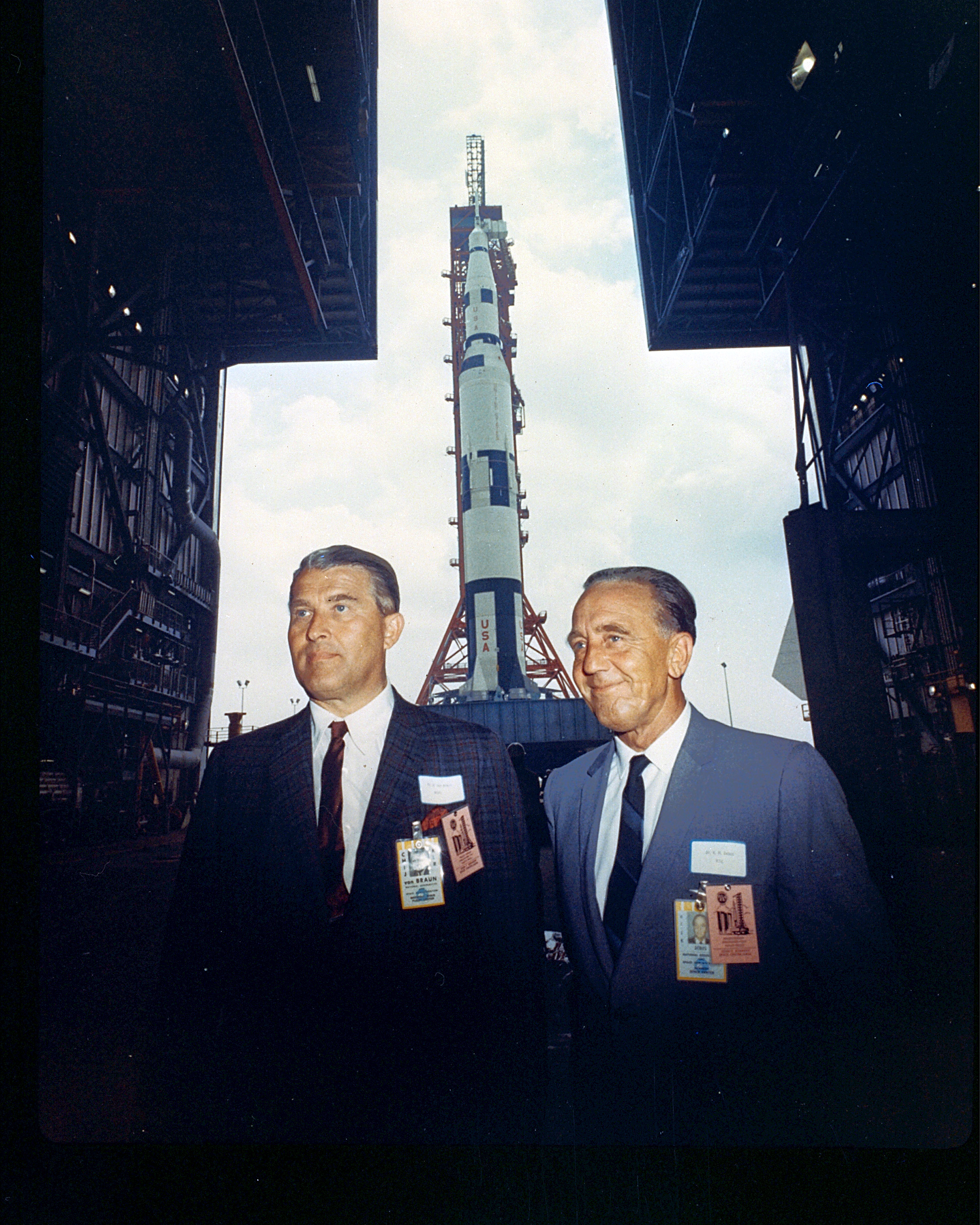
Wernher von Braun and Kurt Debus, Director of the Kennedy Space Center, attending the Saturn 500F rollout from the Vehicle Assembly Building (VAB), 1966

The Marshall Space Flight Center was one of three institutions at NASA involved in the Apollo program. The center was equipped to become a part of Apollo because it had the facilities to study rocketry: Aero-Astrodynamics, Astrionics, Space Sciences, Propulsion and Vehicle Engineering, Computation, Manufacturing, Test, and Quality. Each of these laboratories handled a different aspect of creating and testing rockets that suited the shift from military weapons to space travel. The weaponry from WWII, including rocket and missile in the United States, set the precedent for the kinds of technology used to create the Saturn rocket line. The Marshall engineers' experience in rocket development led to what Dieter Grau, head of the Quality lab, described as a "rigid inspection program" focused on craftsmanship. This meant to create prototypes that had a higher success rate instead of lesser prototypes that required more tests.

The American and German Marshall engineers created the launch vehicles and designed some launching facilities at Cape Canaveral, Florida during the Apollo program. They also created the Saturn rocket line, which was the kind of rocket that sent American astronauts to the Moon. The Saturn rocket line drew on previous military engineering, such as the liquid propulsion system developed from von Braun's V-2 rocket and navigation systems derived from the US army's Redstone and Jupiter rockets.

== Controversy and investigations ==
Before his official approval of the program, President Truman was indecisive about it for sixteen months. Years later in 1963, Truman recalled that he was not in the least reluctant to approve Paperclip; that because of relations with the Soviet Union "this had to be done and was done". Several of the Paperclip scientists were later investigated because of their links with the Nazi Party during the war. Only one Paperclip scientist, Georg Rickhey, was formally tried for any crime, and no Paperclip scientist was found guilty of any crime, in the United States or Germany. Rickhey was returned to Germany in 1947 to stand at the Dora Trial, where he was acquitted.

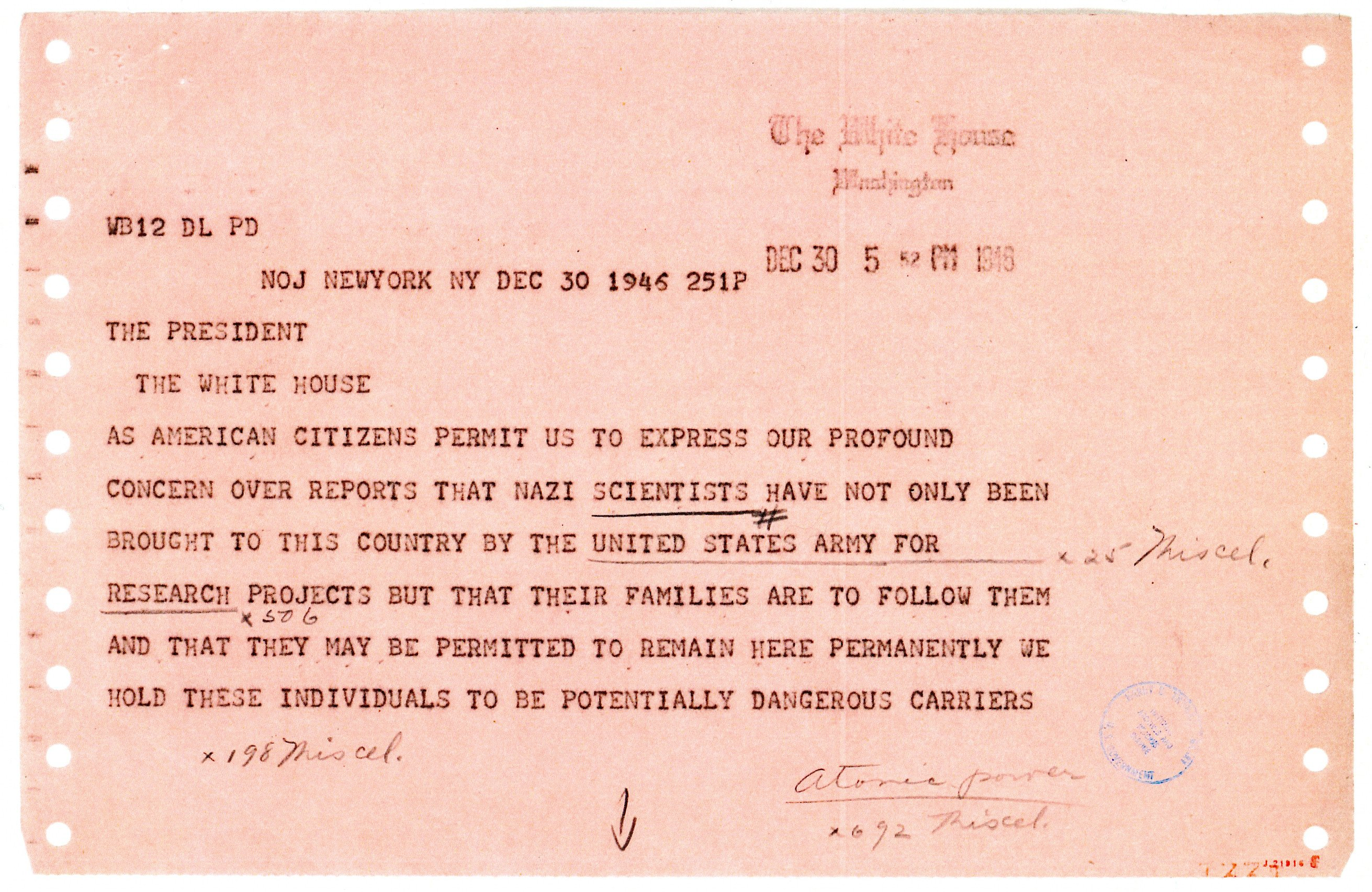
First page of a transcription of a protest telegram about Operation Paperclip sent to Harry S. Truman by the Council Against Intolerance In America, endorsed by several signatories, including Albert Einstein, on December 30, 1946

In 1951, weeks after his US arrival, The Boston Globe accused Walter Schreiber of being a party to human experiments conducted by Kurt Blome at Ravensbrück; he emigrated to Argentina with the aid of the US military.

In 1984, Arthur Rudolph, under perceived threat of prosecution relating to his connection – as operations director for V-2 missile production – to the use of forced labor from Mittelbau-Dora at the Mittelwerk, renounced his US citizenship and moved to West Germany, which granted him citizenship. Von Braun was investigated in 1961 for his involvement in the Nazi party as an SS member. The FBI concluded that he had joined the Nazi Party solely to advance his academic career and to avoid imprisonment.

For 50 years, from 1963 to 2013, the Strughold Award – named after Hubertus Strughold, "the father of space medicine", for his central role in developing innovations like the space suit and space life support systems – was the most prestigious award from the Space Medicine Association, a member organization of the Aerospace Medical Association. On October 1, 2013, in the aftermath of a Wall Street Journal article published on December 1, 2012, which highlighted his connection to human experiments during WWII, the Space Medicine Association's executive committee announced that the Space Medicine Association Strughold Award had been retired.

== Similar operations ==
- Operation APPLEPIE: Project to capture and interrogate key Wehrmacht, RSHA AMT VI, and General Staff officers knowledgeable of the industry and economy of the USSR.
- Operation Bloodstone: Project to recruit and utilize personnel in Eastern Europe to foster anti-Communism.
- Operation Claw: joint Swedish–American operation, with Norwegian support to utilize thirty-five German signals intelligence specialists who had an archive and extensive knowledge about Soviet affairs.
- Camp Dustbin (counterpart of Camp Ashcan): An Anglo-American military interrogation camp for German scientists and industry specialists.
- ECLIPSE (1944): An unimplemented Air Disarmament Wing plan for post-war operations in Europe for destroying V-1 and V-2 missiles.
  - Safehaven: US project within ECLIPSE meant to prevent the escape of Nazi scientists from Allied-occupied Germany.
- Field Information Agency, Technical (FIAT): US Army agency for securing the "major, and perhaps only, material reward of victory, namely, the advancement of science and the improvement of production and standards of living in the United Nations, by proper exploitation of German methods in these fields"; FIAT ended in 1947, when Operation Paperclip began functioning.
- National Interest/Project 63: Job placement assistance for Nazi engineers at Lockheed, Martin Marietta, North American Aviation, and other aeroplane companies, whilst American aerospace engineers were being laid off work.
- Alsos Mission, Operation Big, Operation Epsilon, Russian Alsos: American, British and Soviet efforts to capture German nuclear secrets, equipment, and personnel.
- Operation Backfire: A British effort at recovering rocket and aerospace technology, followed by assembling and testing rockets at Cuxhaven.
- Fedden Mission: British mission to gain technical intelligence concerning advanced German aircraft and their propulsion systems.
- Operation LUSTY (Luftwaffe Secret Technology): US efforts to capture Luftwaffe equipment, technology, and personnel.
- Technical Air Intelligence Unit: joint Allied military intelligence units formed to recover Japanese aircraft
- Operation Osoaviakhim (sometimes transliterated as "Operation Ossavakim"), a Soviet counterpart of Operation Paperclip, involving German technicians, managers, skilled workers and their respective families who were transferred to the USSR in October 1946.
- Operation Surgeon: British operation for denying German aeronautical expertise to the USSR, and for exploiting German scientists in furthering British research.
- Special Mission V-2: April–May 1945 US operation, by Maj. William Bromley, that recovered parts and equipment for 100 V-2 missiles from a Mittelwerk underground factory in Kohnstein within the Soviet zone. Major James P. Hamill co-ordinated the transport of the equipment on 341 railroad cars with the 144th Motor Vehicle Assembly Company, from Nordhausen to Erfurt, just before the Soviets arrived. (See also Operation Blossom, Project Hermes, and Operation Sandy)
- TICOM: Anglo/US project to exploit German cryptographers.

== See also ==
- Carmel Offie
- List of Axis personnel indicted for war crimes
- Project MKNAOMI
- Ratlines (World War II)
- Unit 731 – Japanese human experimenters whose top leaders and members were recruited by the United States for their biological weapons technology
- Upper Atmosphere Research Panel
- Yozma Program - post-Soviet states had mass migration of skilled people to Israel and Israel kick-started venture capital
- Operation Gladio
- Reconstruction of Germany
- Morgenthau Plan

In fiction:

- Dr. Strangelove – a 1964 film where the title character was said to have been brought to the USA via Operation Paperclip.
- Captain America: The Winter Soldier – a 2014 film in which Arnim Zola was said to have been brought to the USA via Operation Paperclip, where he secretly reformed Hydra within S.H.I.E.L.D.
- Moonglow – a 2016 novel which features a subplot which is based on Operation Paperclip.
- A History of What Comes Next – a 2021 alternate history novel that features Operation Paperclip and its Soviet counterpart, Operation Osoaviakhim
- Indiana Jones and the Dial of Destiny – a 2023 film in which the main antagonist is a Nazi scientist working for the Apollo program in 1969. The title character is uneasy about Operation Paperclip thanks to his past clashes with the Nazis.
- Hunters – a 2020 Amazon Prime TV show depicting a fictionalized version of Operation Paperclip and after in the late 1970s, driving the plot of the show.
- "Paper Clip" – an episode of The X-Files featuring a Nazi scientist from the Operation.
- Sniper Elite V2 - a 2012 video game set between Operation Overcast and Operation Paperclip, where the protagonist is an OSS commando sent to retrieve or eliminate Nazi scientists ahead of the Soviets.
