= Oscar Holderer =

German-American engineer

- Born: November 4, 1919; Prüm, Germany
- Died: May 5, 2015 (aged 95); Huntsville, Alabama, United States
- Scientific career
- Fields: Aeronautics
- Workplaces: Peenemünde; Fort Bliss; Redstone Arsenal; Marshall Space Flight Center

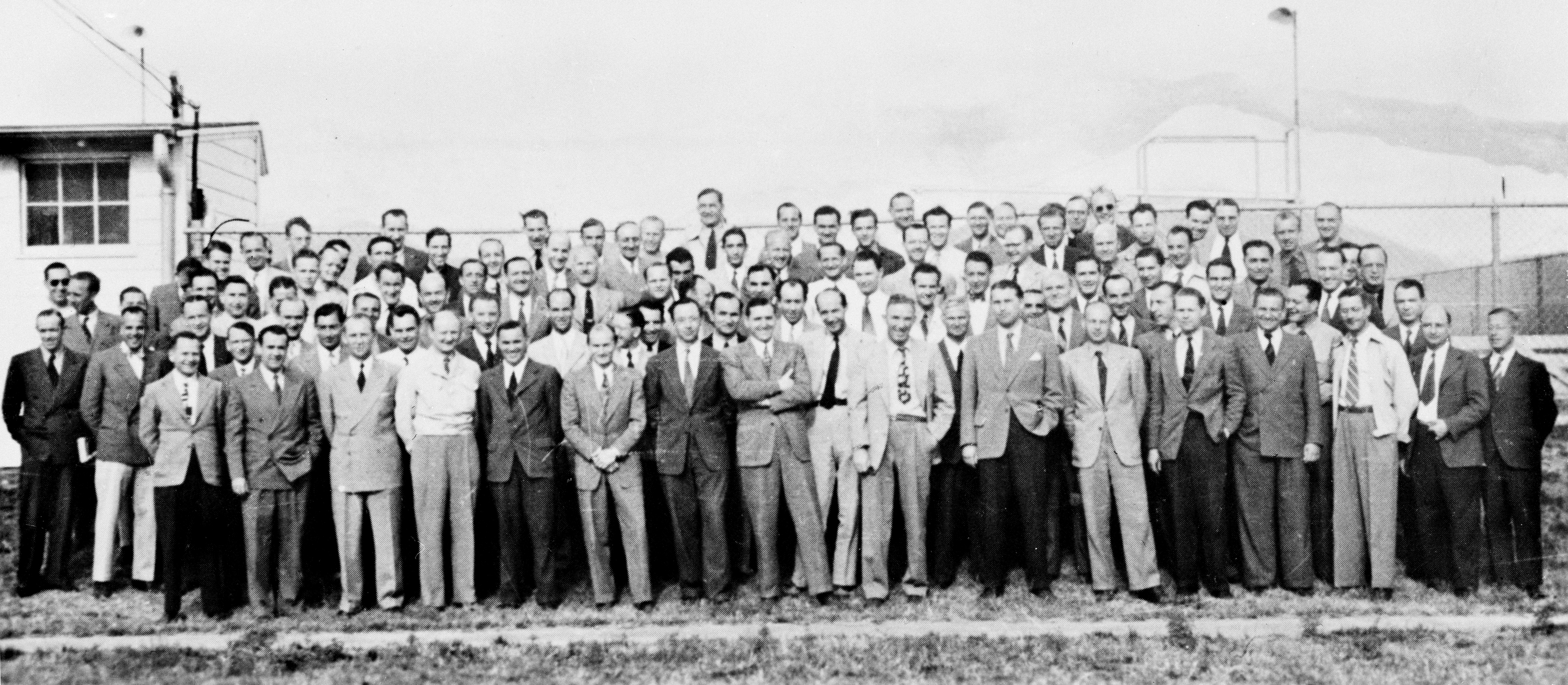
Operation Paperclip Team at Fort Bliss, Texas, August 1946. (pointing the mouse will show the name)

Oscar Carl Holderer (November 4, 1919 – May 5, 2015) was an engineer who worked for Nazi Germany during World War II before coming to the United States and working in the Apollo space program.

== Early life ==
Oscar Carl Holderer was born on November 4, 1919, in Prüm, Germany to parents Richard and Helene Grawe Holderer. He had a brother, Erich Joseph, and sister Doris (Pape).

== Career ==
During World War II, Holderer worked for the German military as a low-level engineer under Wernher von Braun. When the war ended, the United States selected 100 of von Braun's men to help improve the United States' rocket technology as part of Operation Paperclip. Shortly thereafter, another 20 were selected. Holderer was part of the second 20, arriving in 1945 as part of the second group. After a few years in White Sands, New Mexico, the Paperclip team moved to Redstone Arsenal, Alabama, in 1950.

When Holderer arrived at Redstone Arsenal, he rented a home from Milton K. Cummings' sister for two months. That allowed him time to design and start building a house. Unlike the rest of von Braun's team, he did not build his house on Monte Sano, but instead selected a country spot in northwest Huntsville. He continued to expand his residence over time; by 2008, the property included a house, guest house, large machine shop, and small swimming pool. He would end up living there the rest of his life. In 1955, Holderer became an American citizen.

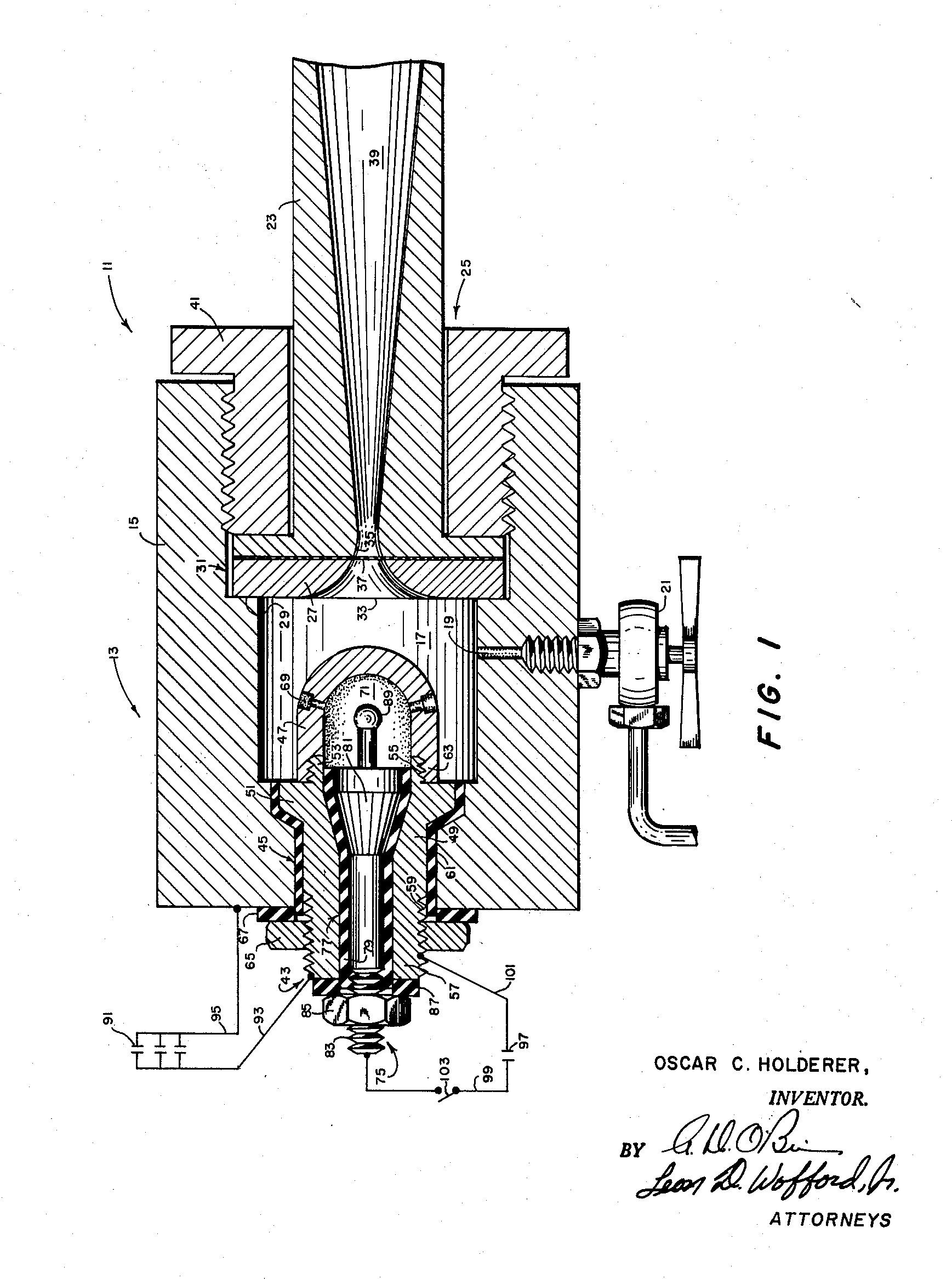
1965 drawing of an Electric arc driven wind tunnel designed by Holderer

Holderer's area of expertise was aerodynamics. According to Space Historian and former NASA publicist Ed Buckbee, Holderer personally brought America's first rocket wind tunnel from Germany and set it up for early testing. At Redstone Arsenal, he worked as a mechanical engineer, designer, and fabricator. He designed the wind tunnel used for Saturn V testing and oversaw the tunnel's construction at the Marshall Space Flight Center. The Saturn V later powered Apollo 11 on its successful Moon landing. Describing the project many years later, Holderer said the historical significance of the project was not felt at the time, but that he "was amazed when [he] heard what they had in mind." The same wind tunnel is still used by NASA for testing as of 2015.

Holderer was promoted several times and found he did not like management. "I'm a hands-on man," he said. "I had been promoted .. [had] too many people under [me]." He retired in 1974, but continued to design space-mission related equipment. He designed multi-axis trainer, 5DF, a one-sixth gravity chair, and other training equipment for the U.S. Space & Rocket Center's Space Camp. As of 2015, the equipment is still in use. He also converted the tail of a jetliner into a movie theater for the center's museum. When Alabama decided to erect a Saturn IB at the I-65 welcome center in 1979, Holderer was asked to facilitate. "NASA said, 'If Oscar says it's OK, it's OK,'" recalled Buckbee. He remained active with the Space & Rocket Center until his death.

== Death and legacy ==
Holderer died in Huntsville on May 5, 2015, at the age of 95, a few days after suffering a stroke. He was survived by his second wife, Jan Smith Dunlap Holderer, with whom he had two stepchildren: Clifford Dunlap and Mary Gaither. He had two sons with his first wife Inge Spors Holderer, to whom he was married for 50 years: Thomas and Michael. Holderer had four grandchildren and three great-grandchildren at the time of his death. He was the last known surviving member of the original Operation Paperclip team. Georg von Tiesenhausen, who emigrated later, was still alive. Upon his death, Buckbee described Holderer as "a very talented man, not only an aeroballistics expert but very accomplished in design and fabrication"

Holderer received 19 patents during his life. He was inducted into the Space Camp Hall of Fame in 2008.
