= Werner Kuers =

German-American engineer and expert in guided missiles

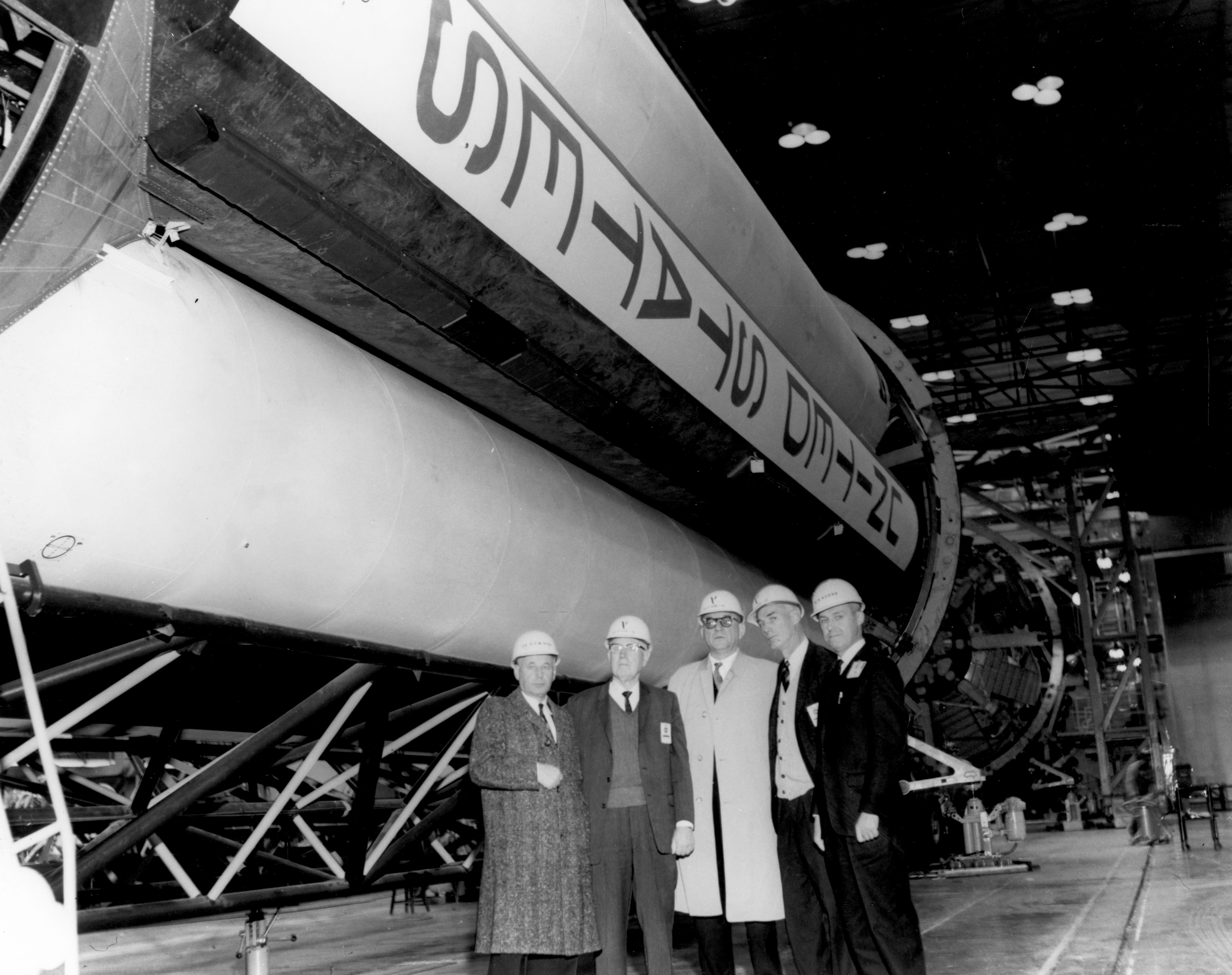
- Members of the House Committee on Science and Astronautics visited the Marshall Space Flight Center (MSFC) on January 3, 1962. Shown here at MSFC’s Manufacturing Engineering Laboratory are (left to right): Eberhard Rees, MSFC; Congressmans George P. Miller, F. Edward Hebert and Robert R. Casey, and Werner Kuers, MSFC.
- Born: April 18, 1907; Berlin, Germany
- Died: May 14, 1983 (aged 68); Oaxaca, Mexico
- Education: Technische Universität Berlin, Berlin (1930)
- Spouse: Maria Kuers
- Children: 2

Werner Richard Kuers (April 18, 1907 - May 14, 1983) was a German-American engineer and expert in guided missiles. Kuers worked at Peenemünde Army Research Center in manufacturing and later, as part of the "von Braun rocket group" through Operation Paperclip, at White Sands V-2 Launching Site and the Marshall Space Flight Center.

== Biography ==
Kuers was born in Berlin in 1907, the same city where he later received his Diplom degree in Engineering from the Königliche Technische Hochschule (now Technische Universität Berlin) in 1930. In 1942 Kuers was sent by the German Army to Peenemünde. There he met Wernher von Braun, who assigned him to work in the center's machine shop. Kuers was discharged from the Army in August 1944, and in February 1945 he exited Peenemünde.

In 1945 Kuers was invited to the United States through Operation Paperclip; he arrived in the country on November 16, 1945, aboard the Argentina and was sent to Fort Bliss. From there Kuers was assigned to White Sands, where he assembled and test launched V-2 rockets from components shipped from Germany. By 1955 he had moved to the Marshall Space Flight Center, and by 1964 he was the center's Director of the Manufacturing Engineering Laboratory. Kuers continued to work there until his retirement in November 1968, after which he moved to Mexico.

Kuers was regarded as an "accomplished violinist." During his time at Fort Bliss, he joined the El Paso Symphony Orchestra. Later, while working at the Marshall Space Flight Center, he was concertmaster for the Huntsville Symphony Orchestra from 1955 until his retirement.
