= Dieter Grau =

American aerospace engineer

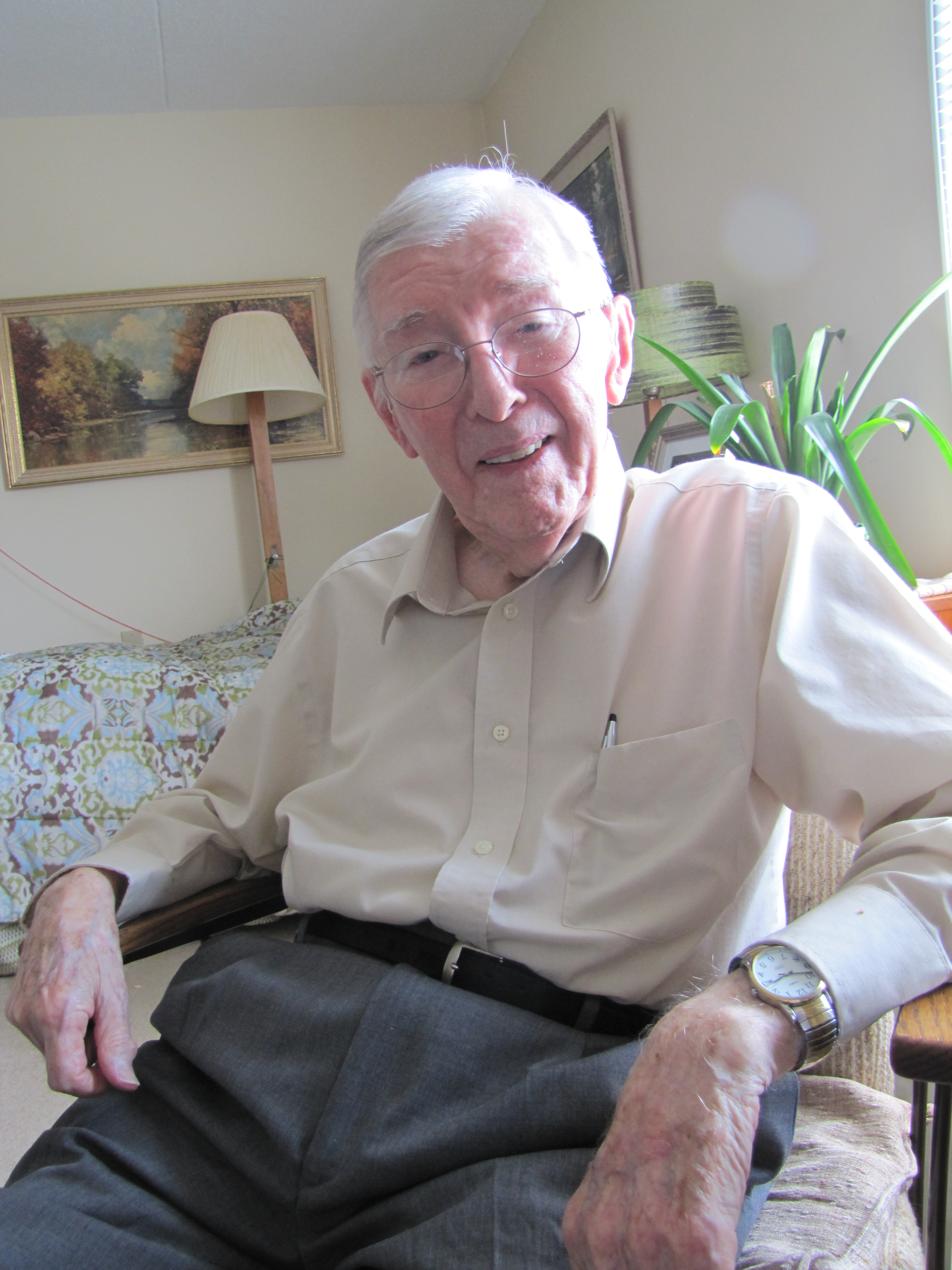
- Born: April 24, 1913; Berlin, Kingdom of Prussia, German Empire
- Died: December 17, 2014 (aged 101); Huntsville, Alabama, U.S.
- Education: Technische Universität Berlin
- Awards: NASA Apollo Achievement Award; NASA Exceptional Service Medal
- Scientific career
- Fields: Aeronautics
- Workplaces: Peenemünde; Fort Bliss; Redstone Arsenal; Marshall Space Flight Center

Dieter Grau (April 24, 1913 – December 17, 2014) was a German-born American aerospace engineer and member of the "von Braun rocket group", at Peenemünde (1939–1945) working on the V-2 rockets in World War II. He was among the engineers who surrendered to the United States and traveled there, providing rocketry expertise via Operation Paperclip, which took them first to Fort Bliss, Texas. Grau was sent by the U.S. Army to White Sands in 1946 to work on the assemblage (with parts shipped from Germany) and testing of the V-2. His wife joined him there in 1947 (Grau's son was born in Texas in 1949). While von Braun was on standby at Fort Bliss, Grau and other German aerospace engineers busily launched V-2s for U.S. scientists to analyze. A total of 67 V-2s were launched at White Sands.

He continued his work with the team when they moved to the Redstone Arsenal (Alabama), and then joined the Marshall Space Flight Center to work for NASA in 1950. Grau served as the director of quality in all of those assignments, including the Saturn V program which took mankind to the moon.

Grau said that von Braun worked closely with then-Colonel Holger Toftoy to develop the kind of team he wanted in the U.S.

"One of my main jobs at that time was to get information to the scientists and see what kind of projects they would like to have and then, of course, we had to accommodate them," Grau recalled. "Even though we were busy, we were more used to much overtime. But that was not the case (at White Sands). There we had a normal workday."

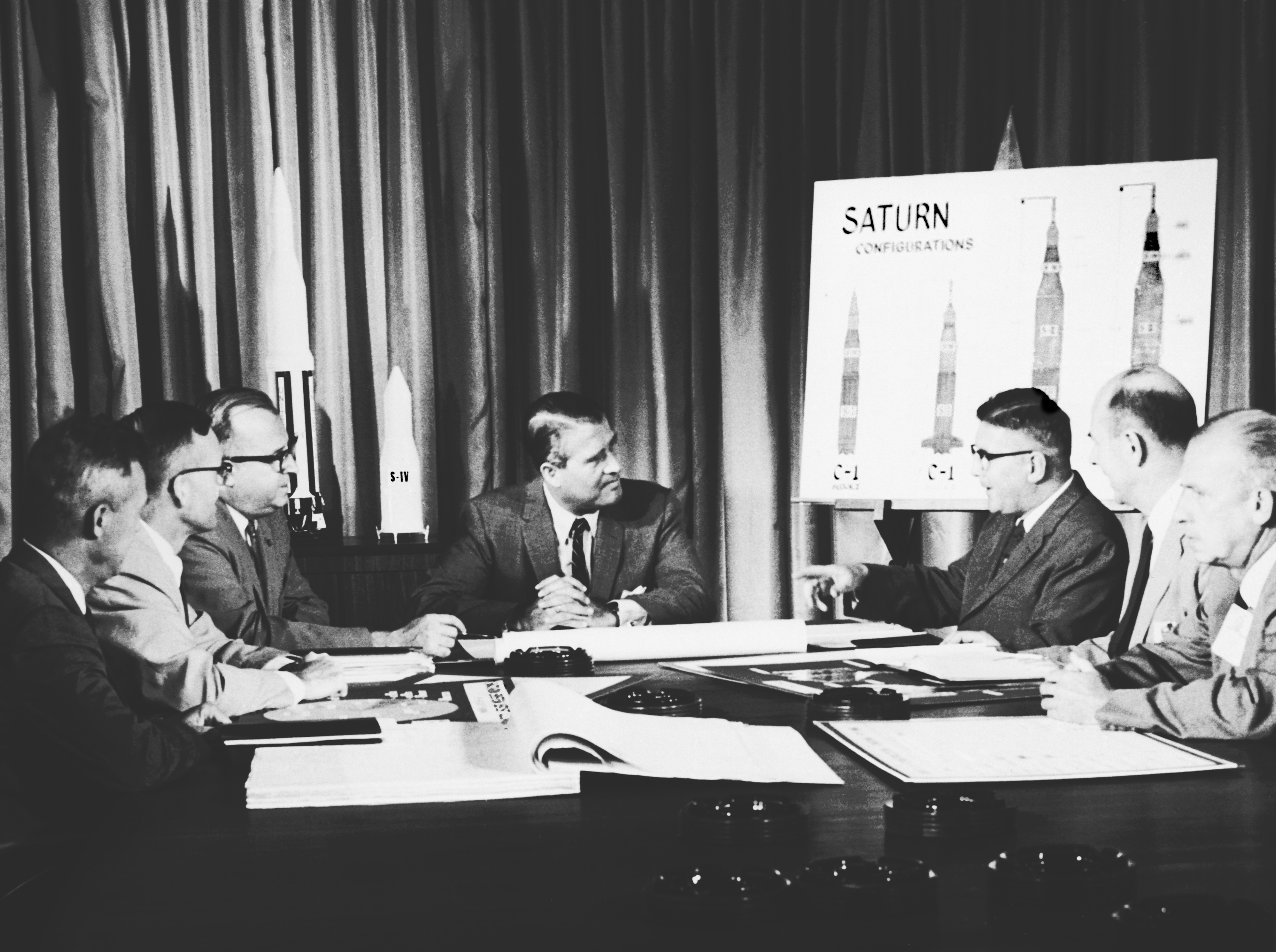
Von Braun's rocket team managers, Grau just right of center, meet to discuss Saturn-rocket configurations in 1961.

Things changed with their arrival in Huntsville. In many ways the Germans felt like they were coming home. Gone were the dry, desert conditions of Fort Bliss and White Sands, replaced with a green, mountainous agricultural area reminiscent of Germany. Grau noted:

"Coming to Huntsville was our coming back to the green country. We were used to green country and out there at Fort Bliss and White Sands there was just desert. We liked this so much better. This was more the landscape we were used to. For us, it was kind of a relief to come to the green country."

"The new Redstone rocket had to go somewhat further. It had to be bigger and it had to be made with American parts," Grau said.

"Industry came in and worked with us to build and develop new stuff. The engine had to be redesigned. It had to be bigger. At that time, industry came really onboard."

Grau, along with von Braun's team, moved from the Army to NASA to develop the first rockets designed expressly for exploration. Grau oversaw quality assurance for the development of the Saturn I and Saturn V rockets. Ed Buckbee, formerly of MSFC public affairs, said of this time, "When Dieter spoke, everybody in the room listened."

"We had wonderful experiences going into space. We had wonderful cooperation to accomplish something never done before," Grau said.

"See how well it all worked out? We had no idea how things would work out. We took a tremendous risk to come here. We never thought we would be able to stay so long. I have real good fortune that I have had a fulfilled life and I remember so much."

Grau died in Huntsville, Alabama, at the age of 101 on December 17, 2014.
