= William August Schulze =

German-American rocket scientist and Operation Paperclip hire (1905–2001)

- Born: November 23, 1905; Neu Laubusch, Germany
- Died: November 4, 2001 (aged 95); Huntsville, Alabama
- Other names: Wilhelm August Schulze, August Schulze
- Spouse: Gertrud Meischeider
- Scientific career
- Workplaces: Fort Bliss, Army Ballistic Missile Agency, Marshall Space Flight Center

William August Schulze (November 23, 1905 – November 4, 2001) was a German-American rocket scientist and Operation Paperclip hire. After involvement with the development of numerous German rockets during World War II, he became one of the first seven Operation Paperclip scientists and engineers to enter the United States, where he served in directing the PGM-11 Redstone program.

== Biography ==
Schulze was born to farmers Matthes and Marie Kopf Schulze in a village in Hoyerswerda. He attended a company school run by Grube Erika, a coal-mining operation that had purchased land from local farmers. At the age of fourteen, Schulze took up a position preparing mechanical drawings for the company's technical bureau, two years later beginning a mechanic apprenticeship that he concluded as a foreman. Once his apprenticeship ended, Schulze traveled to Berlin and attended high school night classes, working during the day at Knorr-Bremse. He followed high school with four years of college, graduating with a BS in mechanical engineering while continuing his job. While in Berlin, Schulze met and married his wife Gertrud Meischeider.

After graduating, Schulze first took up a job designing medical apparatus before continuing to work at Knorr-Bremse as an engineer. On February 1, 1936, he began working at Kummersdorf under Wernher von Braun and Walter Dornberger. While at Kummersdorf, Schulze celebrated von Braun's 25th birthday. In 1937, Schulze moved to Peenemünde Army Research Center; in 1939, he was appointed chief of the Propulsion Unit, a position he held until 1945. At Peenemünde, he was involved with the propulsion or general designs for the A-5, A-4, and A-9 rockets.

After Germany's surrender, Schulze was interrogated, alongside other Peenemünde scientists and engineers, by American and English officials in an interrogation camp in Garmisch-Partenkirchen. Of the 500 men interned at the camp, 118 were selected for American contracts through Operation Paperclip, including Schulze. Furthermore, Schulze, alongside von Braun and six others, was a member of the first group in the program to travel to the United States. Classified as wards of the state, the seven men landed at Fort Strong on September 29, 1945; all but von Braun, Schulze included, were then transferred to Aberdeen Proving Ground to translate and catalog 14 tons of V-2 rocket documents taken from Germany. By 1946, Schulze was among the Operation Paperclip scientists employed at Fort Bliss. He moved to Alabama, where he was naturalized in Birmingham on November 11, 1954. In Alabama, he was employed at the Army Ballistic Missile Agency as chief of the Mechanical Design Section of the Structures and Mechanics Laboratory. He was formally commended within the agency for his directorial work on the PGM-11 Redstone. Schulze later transferred to the new Marshall Space Flight Center, where by 1969 he worked in the Propulsion and Vehicle Engineering Lab. He retired later the same year.

In 2002, Schulze was recognized by his hometown with an air mail envelope and a cancellation stamp, both bearing his image.
