= Camp Dustbin =

British-American interrogation camp during World War II

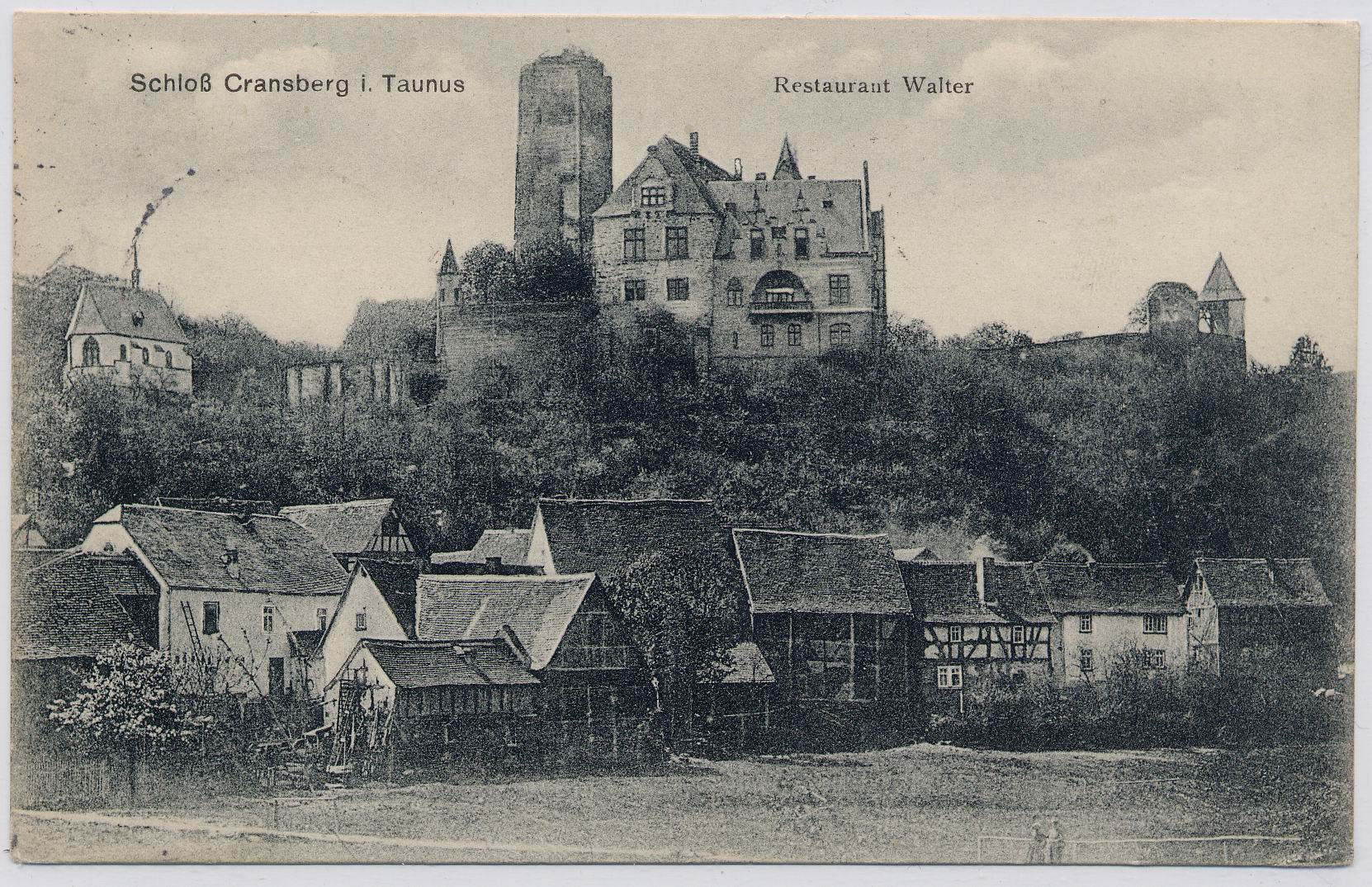
Kransberg Castle before the World War II

Camp Dustbin was a British-American interrogation camp located first at Chesnay, near Versailles, France, and then moved to Kransberg Castle outside Frankfurt, Germany, during World War II. It served as a processing station and interrogation center for senior German scientists, technicians, and administrators captured during the war.

Among them were the following:

- the leaders of the V-2 missile project (including chief designer Wernher von Braun);
- leaders of the atomic and nerve-gas development projects;
- "members of the special research staff of the Reichsforschungsrat (Imperial Research Council)" (including its director, Werner Osenberg);
- officials of the German Ministry of Armaments and War Production, including the minister, Albert Spee,r and his associates Karl-Otto Saur, Karl Maria Hettlage, Walter Dornberger and Theodor Hupfauer;
- Abraham Esau, a leading German expert on radar;
- directors of the Telefunken radio and TV company;
- professor Friedrich Gladenbeck;
- industrialists like "steel barons Fritz Thyssen and Hermann Röchling, and Volkswagen’s Professor Ferdinand Porsche";
- leading figures of I. G. Farben, the developer of nerve gases: Gerhard Schrader, inventor of nerve gases tabun and sarin;
- Richard Kuhn, "inventor of the most toxic of the gases", soman;
- former Minister of Economics Hjalmar Schacht.

The camp was open for the inmates, who "were free to wander around the castle grounds. The wrought-iron gates remained open. ... They passed the time by giving talks, listening to Schacht’s poetry and by staging a weekly cabaret mounted by the inmates that made light of their fate".

In 1946, interrogations in camp Dustbin "had the aim of finding out about Soviet development projects as well as German wartime achievements"; "scientific workers threatened with kidnapping by agents of other countries, chiefly the USSR, were held there".

A parallel American interrogation camp, Ashcan, was created in Luxembourg for the 86 most prominent surviving Nazi leaders prior to their trial in Nuremberg.
