= Werner Osenberg =

German materials scientist

Werner Oskar Ewald Osenberg
- Born: April 26, 1900; Zeitz, Germany
- Died: December 14, 1974 (aged 74); Renningen, West Germany
- Education: Technical University of Munich, Technical University of Dresden
- Known for: Osenberg List, Operation Overcast, armaments development
- Political party: Nazi Party (joined 1933)
- Scientific career
- Fields: Materials science, Mechanical engineering, Armaments research
- Workplaces: Technische Hochschule Hannover, Reich Research Council, Wehrforschungs-Gemeinschaft
- Doctoral advisor: Ewald Sachsenberg

Werner Oskar Ewald Osenberg (April 26, 1900, in Zeitz – December 14, 1974, in Renningen) was a German materials scientist, organizer of German armaments research and armaments developer during the Second World War.

Among other things, Osenberg researched the use of ceramics as a cutting tool material and was given a chair at the Technische Hochschule Hannover in 1938. During the Second World War he was head of the planning office in the Reichsforschungsrat (Reich Research Council). Using his central database, he was able to bring 5,000 scientists and technicians back from the war front. At his institute in Lindau in Lower Saxony, he also carried out armaments research. In 1945 he was brought to the United States. His research database formed the basis for the selection of German scientists as part of Operation Overcast by the United States.

== Education and early career ==
Osenberg received his high school diploma in the spring of 1918. He was then drafted into the navy and attended a course to become a naval officer candidate in October and November 1918. From 1920 he studied mechanical engineering, first at the Technical University of Munich and then at the Technical University of Dresden, graduating in 1924 with a diploma. In 1927 he received his doctorate under Ewald Sachsenberg with a thesis on the subject of machining processes using wood drills and remained there as Sachsenberg's scientific assistant until 1938. In 1938 Osenberg carried out the first investigations into the use of oxide ceramics as cutting materials.

In April 1933, Osenberg became a member of the Nazi Party, and in June 1933 he joined the SS. From 1936 he was active in the Sicherheitsdienst and took over the supervision of the Press Office at TU Dresden.

== Torpedo research ==
In 1938, Osenberg was appointed to the chair of machine tools at the Technical University of Hanover. There he established a development department for the Navy and an office of the Reich Office for Economic Development. In 1942, Osenberg was appointed head of the research, invention and patent department of the Oberkommando der Marine. A model torpedo test station with a tank measuring 240 square metres (2,600 sq ft) was designed. In this tank, the Messpistole 37 was tested, as well as a device for artificially generating disturbances in torpedo test projectiles, a torpedo with a fin to prevent heeling, and a method for creating deliberate disturbances in the course of a torpedo.

In addition, Osenberg was appointed by the Commander-in-Chief of the Navy to record unused or under-utilized research capacities for use by the Navy. For this purpose, Osenberg's employees in Hanover created an extensive index. This preliminary work was probably the reason why Osenberg was appointed head of the planning office of the Reich Research Council, because such a research index was an important basis for the required tasks.

== The Planning Office of the Reich Research Council ==
The reorganized Reich Research Council (RFR) was founded in Berlin in 1942. Its aim was to align state and university research more closely with the requirements of warfare. The president of the RFR was Reichsmarschall Hermann Göring, whose political power was beginning to decline at the time. A comprehensive organization was planned for the RFR with 17 department heads and 20 representatives, who would be supported by technical colleges, universities, institutes of the Kaiser Wilhelm Society and others.

In June 1943 the Planning Office was also created. This was hidden in Lindau am Harz from October 1943 to April 1945. Its postal address was Northeim, PO Box 148. Göring appointed Werner Osenberg as head of this planning office. Its tasks were summarized in five guidelines.

During the bombing of Hanover in World War II in August 1943, Hanover was heavily bombed, and Osenberg's institute was also partially damaged. It was decided to evacuate to a more rural area and they finally landed in Lindau in October 1943. There, the Mushaus Lindau at Lindau Castle, with its walls up to 2.3 metres (7.5 ft) thick, offered good protection from bombing. Osenberg came from Hanover with around 50 employees, and in the end their number had grown to 298. There was also a branch in Berlin-Dahlem.

== Research index ==
Osenberg expanded his collection of addresses of under-utilized research capacities in Lindau into a central index for all branches of the Wehrmacht. This index made it possible to register scientists and technicians at universities, scientific institutes and Wehrmacht offices. It comprised around 2,000 index cards with the names of institutes and other research institutions, and also contained a list of Wehrmacht units from which soldiers could be withdrawn. This research index, called the Osenberg List by the Allies, is now stored in the Bundesarchiv in Berlin.

== Repatriation campaign ==
With a total of four memoranda sent to 50 people from government leadership, the Wehrmacht, and the scientific community, Osenberg pursued his main goal: to make science and technology more useful for warfare. The most important means of achieving this was the repatriation campaign, which began in the autumn of 1944. With the help of the card index, 5,000 skilled workers were brought back from their units and placed in companies that were vital to the war effort. A further 10,000 of these skilled workers were declared indispensable in order to prevent them from being sent to the front.

== Wehrforschungs-Gemeinschaft ==
In August 1944, at Osenberg's insistence, Göring founded another institution with similar goals to the Planning Office, the Defense Research Association (Wehrforschungs-Gemeinschaft-WFG). Its task was also to concentrate technical research, including private industry, on war needs. Its director was to manage the research projects. Osenberg became the director, and his powers were subsequently strengthened. The Defense Research Association received a bloated bureaucracy. Historians are divided on the value of the WFG. Karl-Heinz Ludwig called it "a huge fraudulent enterprise" and lamented the senselessness of the whole enterprise. Ruth Federspiel, on the other hand, sees the WFG as an important step towards interdisciplinary research planning.

== Weapons development ==
In 1944, Osenberg also began researching and developing armaments in Lindau. He defined his mission as head of the RFR as putting solved problems to practical use. The most important project was a rocket warhead with the code name Bienenkorb (beehive) , which was intended to defend against enemy fighter planes. The basis for this was the use of the Schardin effect, known scientifically as the Munroe effect. In the Bienenkorb project, hundreds of explosive devices were joined together in a similar fashion as a honeycomb, and the incendiary device carrier had a concave curvature. However, during tests in Redlin in January 1945, the warheads failed completely and, despite improvements, they were never used.

One of Osenberg's own developments was the multi-stage rocket Planet, which was intended for bomber defence. As with the Bienenkorb project, the Aerodynamics Research Institute in Göttingen was involved in the research process. The idea was to develop a mother rocket that would ignite at some distance from the aircraft being shot down and would then release up to 30 daughter rockets. These were to fall through the bomber squadron in a circular motion and hit as many enemy aircraft as possible with their spiral trajectory. But Lindau never got beyond the development of daughter rockets.

The American historian Michael J. Neufeld warned against overestimating Osenberg's role. The Reich Research Council was "fundamentally weak and ineffective in most areas of research and development, notably rocketry." Birgit Schlegel judged the armament developments of the last months of the war to be "unplanned and headless."

== Post-war period ==
The Osenberg Office, as the institution was called by the residents of Lindau, functioned until the end of March 1945. On April 10, 1945, the Americans moved in, Osenberg was arrested, taken to Paris and then to the United States. From April 1945 to November 1947, Osenberg was interned. Shortly after his capture, he handed over a list with the names of 15,000 German scientists to the Allies. This list was used for Operation Paperclip, also known as "Operation Overcast". This was intended to transfer German scientists, including convinced National Socialists, into American service. In 1948, Osenberg reappeared in Lindau, and until the 1960s he was praised for his repatriation operation.

== Research from 1954 ==
In 1954, Osenberg returned to the Technical University of Hanover and took over the chair for production technology and machine tools. Until his retirement in 1970, Osenberg mainly investigated the machining of brittle materials with high-hardness cutting materials.
