= Holger Toftoy =

United States Army general (1902–1967)

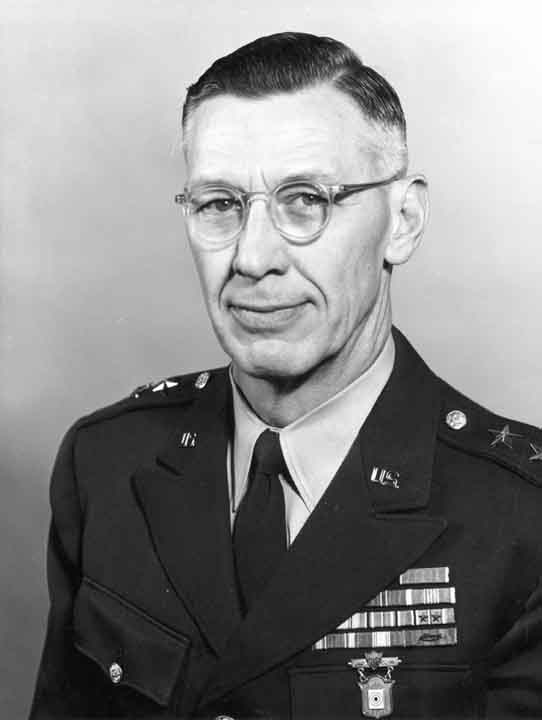
- Born: Holger Nelson Toftoy; 31 October 1902; Marseilles, Illinois, U.S.
- Died: 19 April 1967 (aged 64); Huntsville, Alabama, U.S.
- Resting place: Arlington National Cemetery
- Education: United States Military Academy
- Occupation: Military officer
- Military career
- Allegiance: United States
- Branch: United States Army
- Service years: 1922–1960
- Rank: Major general
- Conflicts: World War II

Major General Holger Nelson Toftoy (31 October 1902 – 19 April 1967) was a United States Army career officer instrumental to the development of the United States' early rocketry after World War II, such as the Redstone missile. He persuaded senior officers to bring German scientists to the US after the war, to make use of their expertise, and supervised the relocation of more than 119 scientists.

In 1952 he was appointed to direct the Ordnance Missile Laboratories at Redstone Arsenal near Huntsville, Alabama. By 1958 he was deputy commanding general of the Army Ordnance Missile Command, Redstone Arsenal. Later that year he was reassigned as commanding general of Aberdeen Proving Ground, Maryland. Two years later he retired because of health issues, and moved to Florida.

== Early life and military career ==
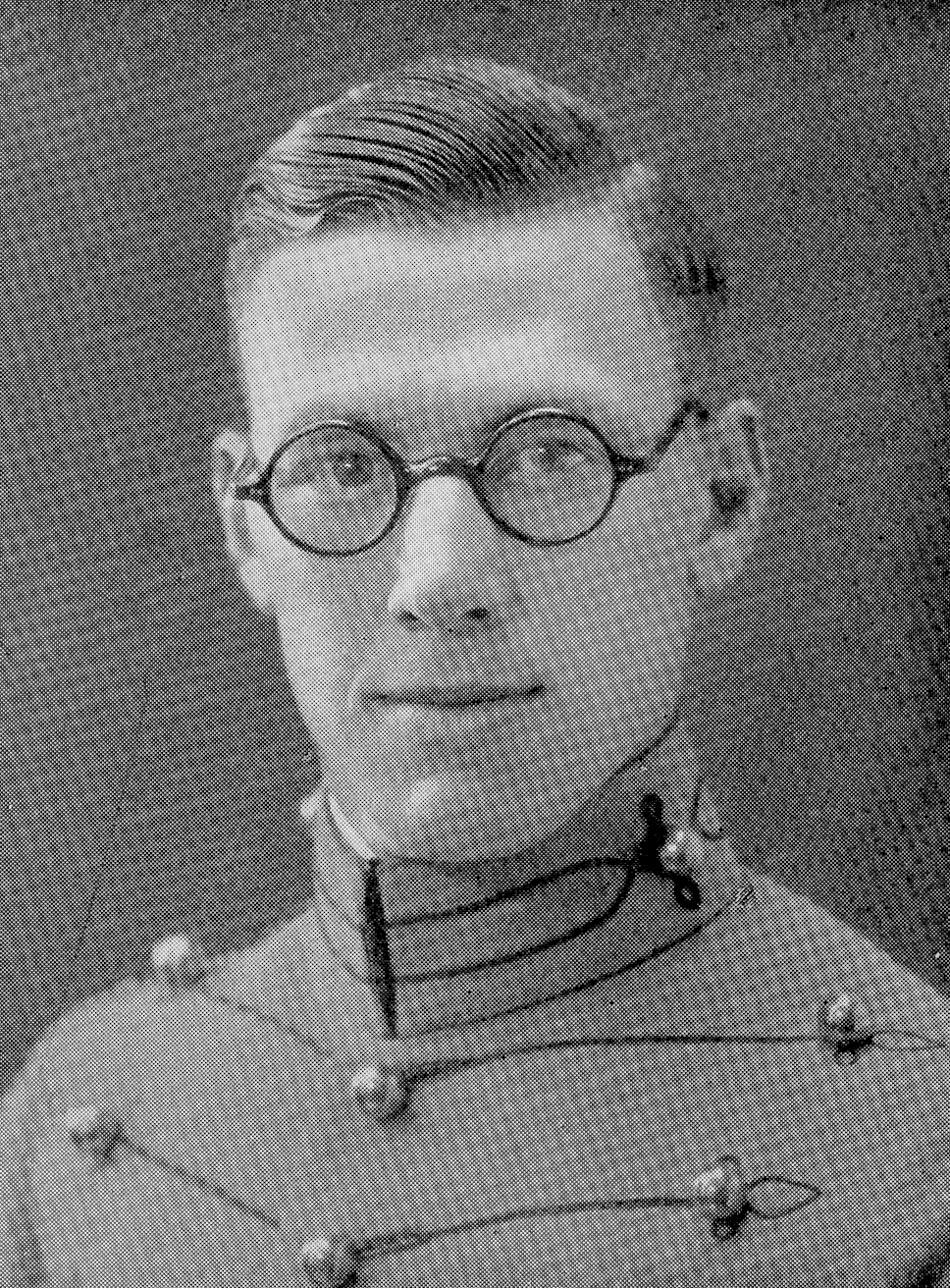
At West Point in 1926

Toftoy was born on 31 October 1902, in Marseilles, Illinois. He attended local schools before college.

He studied at the University of Wisconsin–Madison as an ROTC cadet before transferring to the United States Military Academy at West Point, where he graduated in 1926. After taking basic flight training, he was transferred to the Coast Artillery and served three years in Hawaii as a battery commander before returning to West Point as an instructor.

In the 1930s Toftoy was assigned to the Panama Canal to command the mine defenses of the Pacific approaches. In 1938 he was transferred to the Submarine Mine Depot in Fort Monroe, where he served six years as chief of the Industrial and the Research and Development divisions.

== Operation Paperclip ==
While working at the Submarine Mine Depot, Toftoy oversaw the development and design of a new system of controlled submarine mines that was widely used during World War II. Toftoy acquired great expertise in mines and explosives; he helped clear harbors in France during the war.

In 1944, Toftoy became chief of the Army Ordnance Technical Intelligence teams assigned to Europe to seek and evaluate captured enemy ordnance weapons and equipment. During this time, Toftoy received a request from Colonel Gervais Trichel, chief of the rocket branch in the Ordnance Department at the Pentagon, to acquire and ship 100 operational V-2 rockets to the White Sands Missile Range in New Mexico for testing. Soon after the Allied capture of the areas around Nordhausen and the Mittelwerk, Toftoy set up Special Mission V-2 to do the job.

He assigned Major William Bromley in command of the special mission, who reported to Toftoy through Major James P. Hamill. The latter was responsible for shipping the weapons from Nordhausen to Antwerp, and from there to New Orleans, for transportation to White Sands. Bromley and Hamill went to central Germany to salvage as many missiles as they could, under pressure because of the unwelcome news that U.S. forces would soon be withdrawing, as Nordhausen was in the planned Soviet Zone of Occupation, later East Germany. Although one hundred complete V-2s were not available, Toftoy organized U.S. soldiers and camp workers to put partially completed rockets and major components into hastily requisitioned rail cars. From 22 to 31 May, several freight trains left Nordhausen for Antwerp loaded with missile and missile parts, thus successfully completing the mission.

Toftoy knew the U.S. Army was planning to add guided missiles to its weapons program. He cabled the Pentagon, then personally went to Washington to recommend to senior officers that German scientists be brought to the U.S. for interrogation and possible employment. The mission became known as Operation Paperclip. By September 1945, the first group of scientists, including Wernher von Braun, had arrived in the United States. In the first year of this program, some 119 German scientists were brought to the United States under Toftoy's leadership. Toftoy was transferred to Washington and assigned responsibility for direction of the Army guided missile program.

== After the war ==
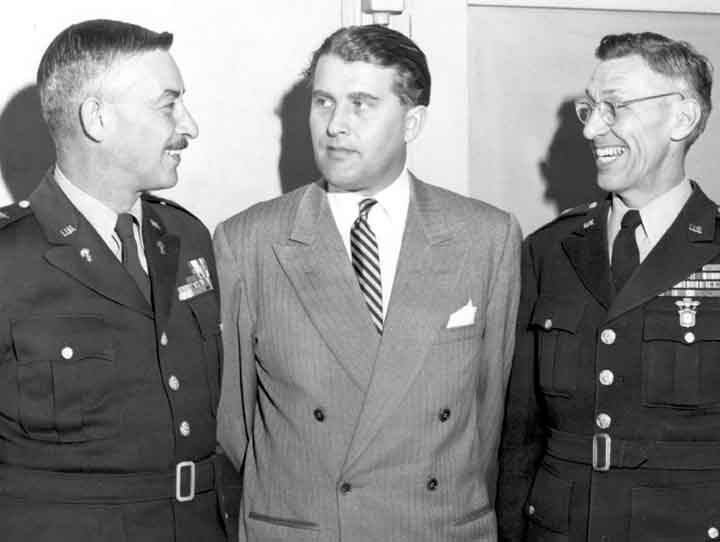
RSA commander Maj. Gen. John Medaris, Wernher von Braun, and RSA deputy commander Brig. Gen. Holger Toftoy (l−r:) in the 1950s

In 1952, Toftoy was assigned to Redstone Arsenal, Alabama, as director of the Ordnance Missile Laboratories. This was responsible for planning, technical control, and supervision of what had become the nationwide Army guided missile and rocket development program. During this time the arsenal became responsible for the research, development, procurement, production, storage and maintenance of the entire Army family of missiles and rockets; some of the products of that program became widely used in the U.S. Military program. They included the PGM-19 Jupiter, the MGR-1 Honest John, the LIM-49 Nike Zeus and the MIM-3 Nike Ajax, among others. In 1958, Toftoy became deputy commanding general of the Army Ordnance Missile Command, Redstone Arsenal. He served as commander at RSA until July 1958, when he was named the commanding general of Aberdeen Proving Ground, Maryland (August 1958).

In 1960 Toftoy retired from the army for health reasons, and moved to Treasure Island, Florida. There he had a private boat landing and access to the Gulf of Mexico for indulging in his passion for fishing. He continued to be active in his field, retained as a consultant by the Northrop Corporation and by the Brown Engineering Company. He also became involved in local civic affairs; he was elected in 1962 as President of the Isle of Capri Civic Association.

== Death and honors ==
After recurrence of an old ailment during a Christmas visit to his daughter at Huntsville in 1966, Toftoy was transported to Walter Reed Army Medical Center. He underwent four major operations in the following months. Toftoy died on 19 April 1967. Burial was in Arlington National Cemetery with full military honors.

- Toftoy Hall was dedicated at Redstone Arsenal on November 3, 1967; it provides basic electronics training for soldiers. It now houses the Education Center.
- The Ordnance School at Fort Lee has a Toftoy Hall for the Armament and Electronic Maintenance Training Department.
- In 1968, a commemorative plaque was placed in Big Spring Park in Huntsville, Alabama. Townspeople had nicknamed him as "Mr. Missile". He was a member of Helion Lodge #1 Free & Accepted Masons in Huntsville.

== Dates of rank ==
Insignia	Rank	Component	Date
No insignia	Cadet	United States Military Academy	1 July 1922
	Second lieutenant	U.S. Army Air Service	12 June 1926 (transferred to United States Army Coast Artillery Corps 9 March 1927)
	First lieutenant	Regular Army	25 November 1931
	Captain	Regular Army	12 June 1936
	Major	Army of the United States	31 January 1941 (accepted 5 February 1941)
	Lieutenant colonel	Army of the United States	1 February 1942
	Colonel	Army of the United States	17 March 1943
	Major	Regular Army	12 June 1943
	Colonel	Regular Army	15 May 1950
	Brigadier general	Army of the United States	1 November 1952 (backdated to 1 January 1952)
	Major general	Army of the United States	1 January 1952
	Brigadier general	Regular Army	31 March 1955 (backdated)
	Major general	Regular Army	31 March 1955

== See also ==
- Hermann Oberth
