= Eberhard Rees =

German-American aerospace engineer (1908-1998)

Dr Eberhard Rees
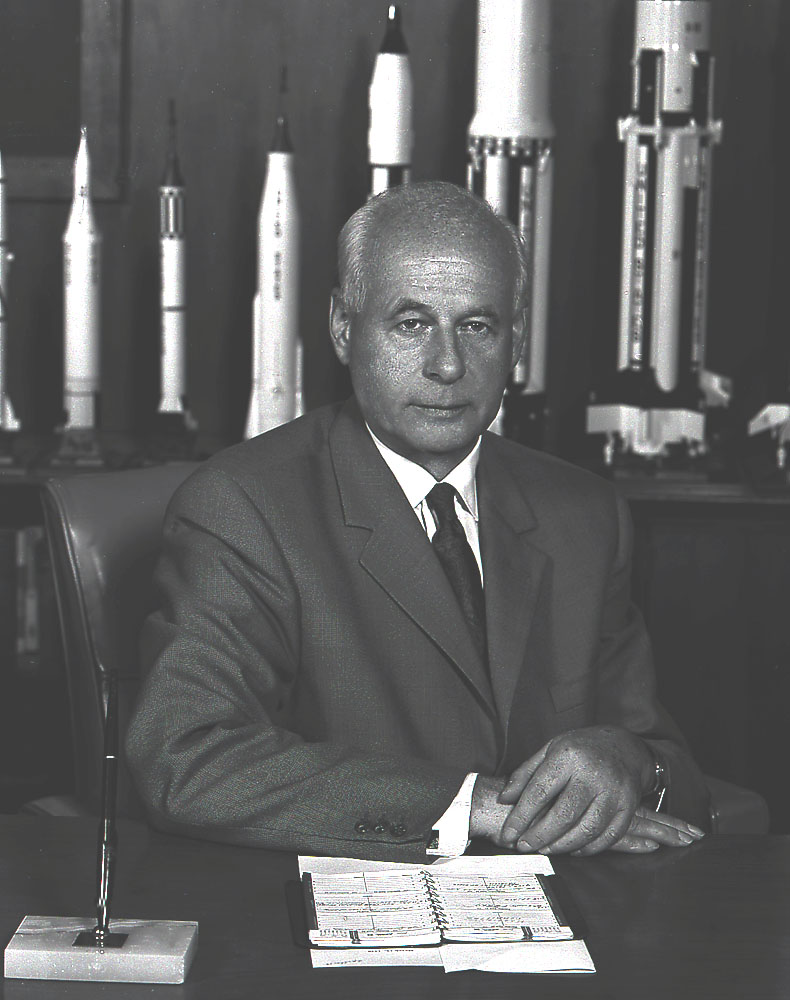
- March 27, 1970, photo
- Born: April 28, 1908; Trossingen, Germany
- Died: April 2, 1998 (aged 89); DeLand, Florida, United States
- Education: University of Stuttgart; Dresden Institute of Technology (1934)
- Scientific career
- Fields: Aerospace engineering
- Workplaces: 1939-1945: HVP; 1945-1960: ABMA; 1960-1973: NASA

Notes
- Fellow of the American Rocket Society (1959)

Eberhard Friedrich Michael Rees (April 28, 1908 – April 2, 1998) was a German-American (by becoming a naturalized citizen of the United States) rocketry pioneer and the second director of NASA's Marshall Space Flight Center.

== Biography ==
Rees was born in Trossingen, Baden-Württemberg, Germany. After studying engineering at the University of Stuttgart, and graduating from the Dresden University of Technology in 1934 with his master's degree, he worked his way to become the assistant manager of a steel mill in Leipzig, Germany. Rees arrived at the Army Research Center Peenemünde in the spring of 1939 and managed V-2 rocket fabrication and assembly. He served as Wernher von Braun's deputy from World War II through the Apollo program.

Rees was in the first group of Operation Paperclip rocket scientists brought to the United States by the Army Ordnance Corps, arriving at Logan Field on October 2, 1945, and serving first at the Army Aberdeen Proving Grounds, then at Fort Bliss, in 1946 and in 1950, at the Redstone Arsenal. In August 1957, his team developed the ablative heat shield.

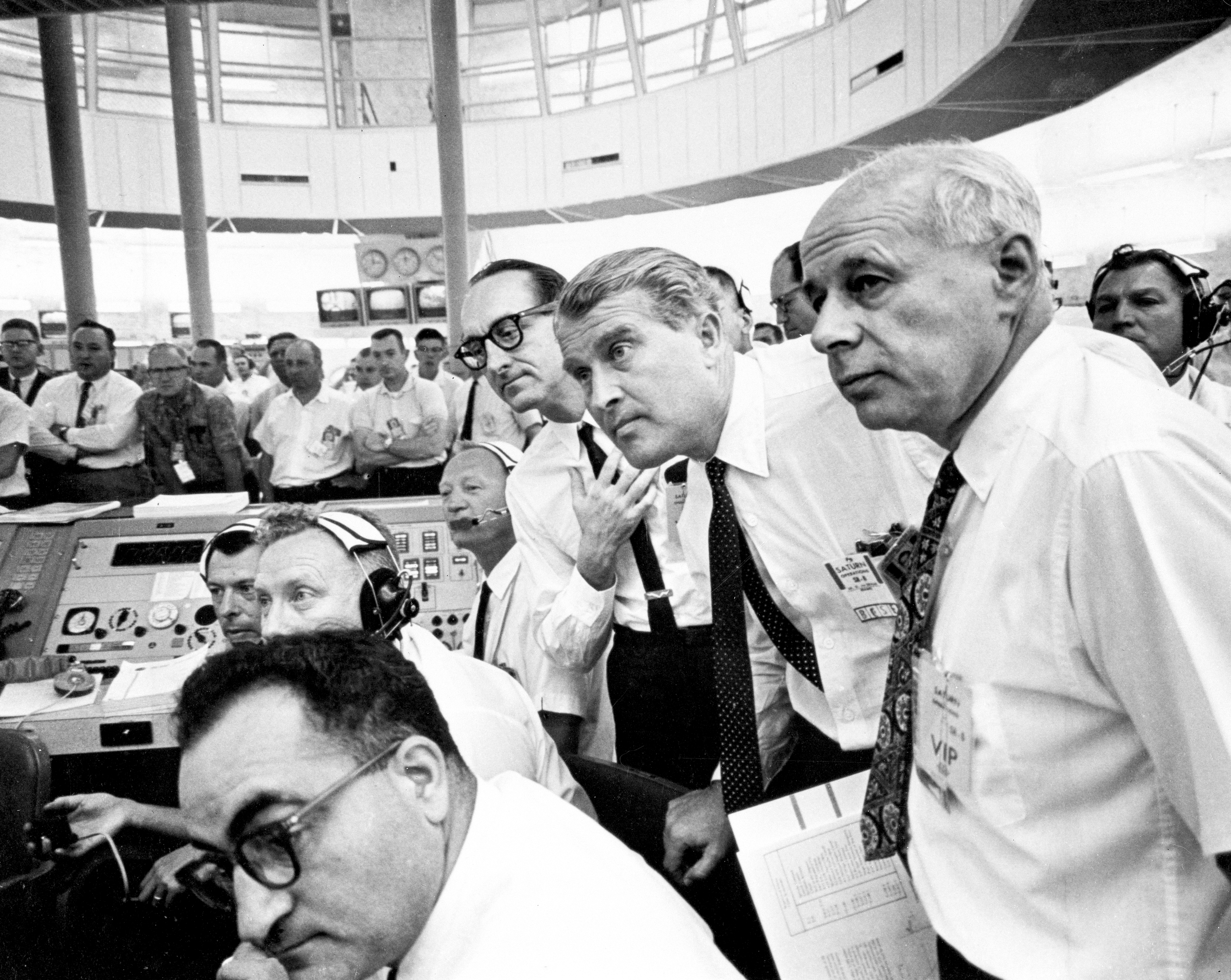
At launch control for the May 28, 1964, SA-6 launch

After serving as Deputy Director of Development Operations for the Army Ballistic Missile Agency, Rees became the Marshall Space Flight Center Deputy for Technical and Scientific Matters in 1960 and directed the Lunar Roving Vehicle program.

On March 1, 1970, Rees was appointed as the Director of the Marshall Space Flight Center, in Huntsville, Alabama, as von Braun's handpicked successor, from which he managed the Skylab space station development and construction. He retired from NASA in 1973.

On April 2, 1998, Rees died in a DeLand, Florida, hospital at the age of 89.

Preceded by Wernher von Braun	MSFC Director; 1970 - 1973	Succeeded by Rocco Petrone
