= Georg von Tiesenhausen =

German and American rocket scientist (1914–2018)

Georg Heinrich Patrick Baron von Tiesenhausen
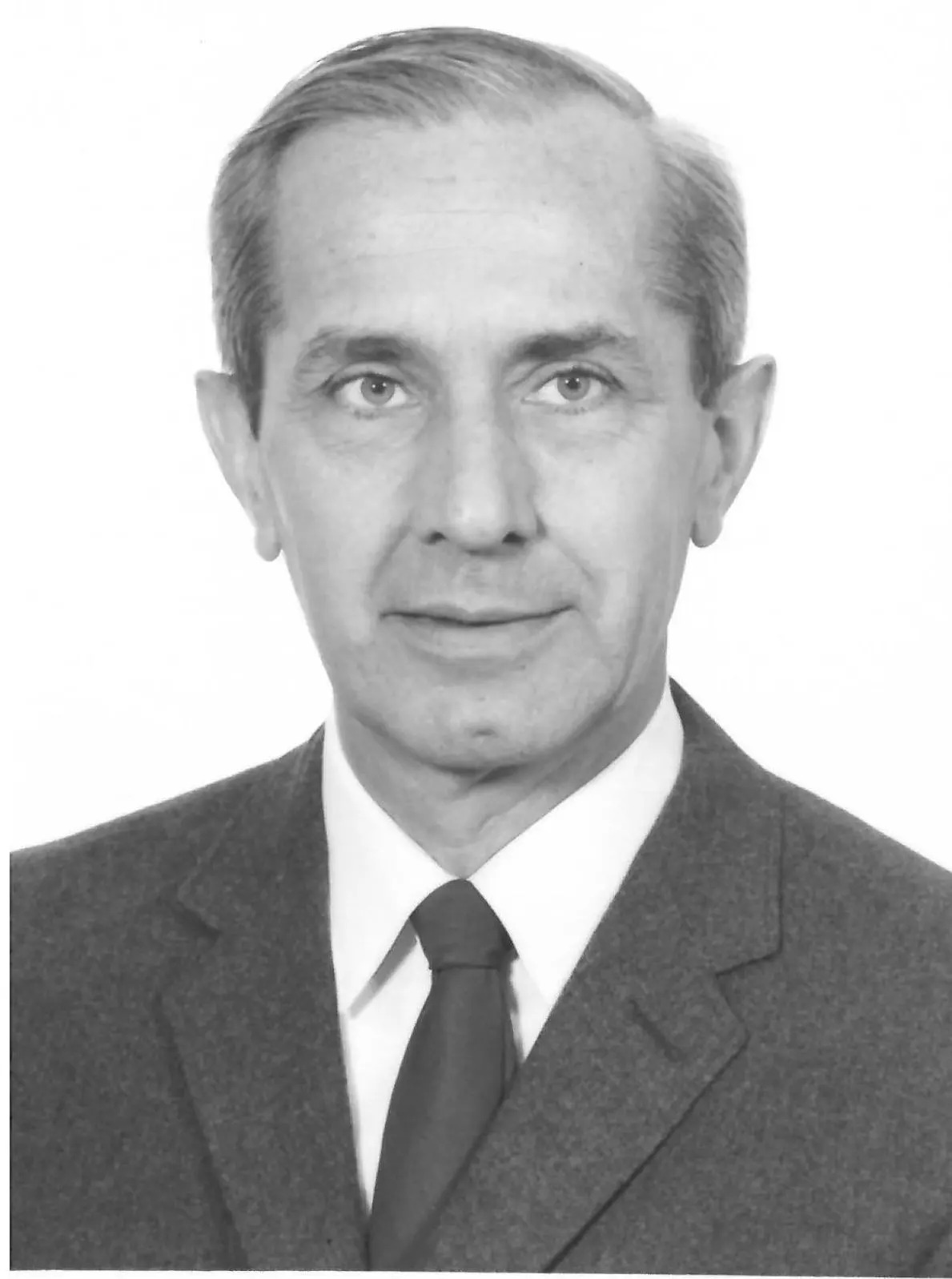
- Born: May 18, 1914; Riga, Governorate of Livonia, Russian Empire
- Died: June 3, 2018 (aged 104); Huntsville, Alabama, U.S.
- Education: HAW Hamburg
- Known for: Operation Paperclip, Lunar Roving Vehicle
- Spouse: Asta Esch Von Tiesenhausen
- Children: Evamaria, Georg Jr. and Jutta
- Scientific career
- Fields: Mathematics, Engineering
- Workplaces: Wehrmacht, Peenemünde Army Research Center, United States Army, NASA

Georg Heinrich Patrick Baron von Tiesenhausen (May 18, 1914 – June 3, 2018) was a German and American rocket scientist.

After being brought to the United States in 1953 as part of Operation Paperclip, he was part of Wernher von Braun's team at the United States Army, and later, NASA. He is credited with the first complete design of the Lunar Roving Vehicle which was driven on the Moon on the Apollo 15, 16, and 17 missions, and made a variety of other contributions to the space program.

== Early years ==
Tiesenhausen was born in Riga, Latvia, in the Russian Empire to a Baltic German noble family Tiesenhausen from his father's side, while his mother was of Scottish ancestry. He studied engineering in Hamburg, but was conscripted to the Luftwaffe in 1939 and sent to the Eastern Front. He was allowed to continue his studies and in 1943 and graduated from University of Hamburg. After his graduation he was sent to the Peenemünde Army Research Center.

== Career ==
Tiesenhausen worked with Wernher von Braun developing V-2 rockets in Germany during World War II. He came to America in 1953 as part of Operation Paperclip, where he again worked with von Braun on guided missiles such as the Redstone, this time for the United States Army at Redstone Arsenal in Huntsville, Alabama. He was later transferred to NASA, where he worked on various spaceflight programs, including the Apollo program, which landed men on the Moon.

He continued to work for NASA well into the Shuttle era. Later he worked on space tether missions.

== After NASA ==
Between 1987 and 2010, von Tiesenhausen frequently volunteered at the U.S. Space & Rocket Center in Huntsville, Alabama, lecturing to students in Space Camp programs about the future of space exploration and other topics.

== Awards ==
In 2007, he became one of the original inductees into the Space Camp Hall of Fame. On February 3, 2011, he was presented with the U.S. Space & Rocket Center's Lifetime Achievement Award for Education by Apollo 11 astronaut Neil Armstrong. "Dr. von T. is one of those rare individuals who has a natural ability to inform and inspire, to educate and motivate, and, most remarkably, to endure," Armstrong said. Neil Armstrong gave a brief but impressive summary of Georg von Tiesenhausen achievements: "He is and has been a person who imagines what can be, and he has the skills to convert that image into reality."

== Sources ==
- Birthday surprise leaves von Tiesenhausen giddy. The Huntsville Times May 14, 2009
- Neil Armstrong landing at U.S. Space and Rocket Center to present award. January 27, 2011
- Who's who in frontiers of science and technology: Volume 2
- Remembering Dr. Georg von Tiesenhausen YouTube
