= Kransberg Castle =

Castle near Kransberg in the Taunus mountains in the German state of Hesse

Coordinates: 50°20′43″N 08°35′26″E

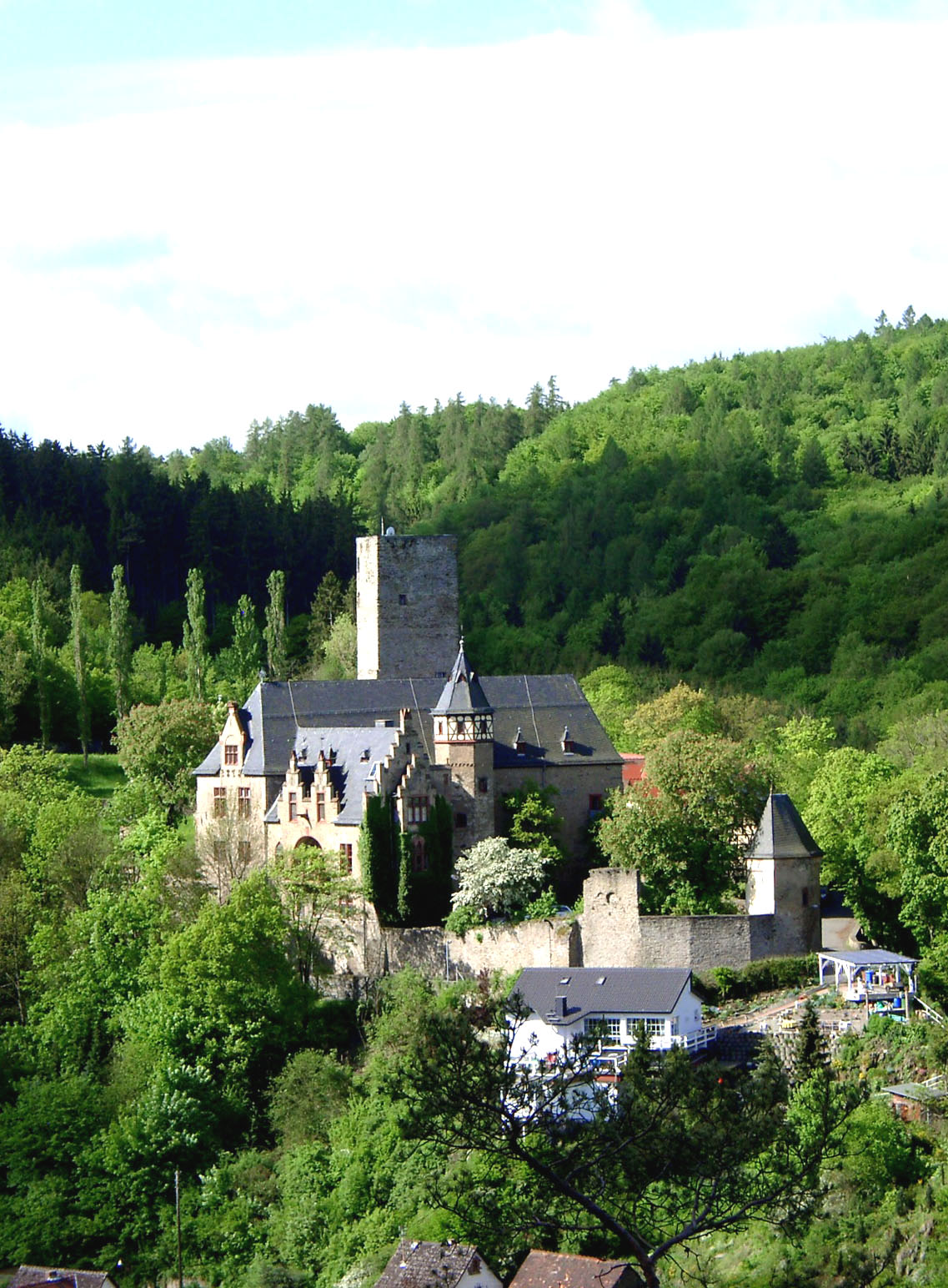
Kransberg Castle

Kransberg Castle is situated on a steep rock near Kransberg (incorporated into Usingen in 1971), a village with about 800 inhabitants in the Taunus mountains in the German state of Hesse, about 40 kilometers north of Frankfurt. The medieval building, which acquired its current appearance in the late 19th century, served military and intelligence purposes in World War II and during the Cold War. It was returned to its original representation purposes during the second half of the 20th century, and briefly became a business park for small information technology and internet companies in the early post-millennium years.

== Middle Ages to the 19th Century ==
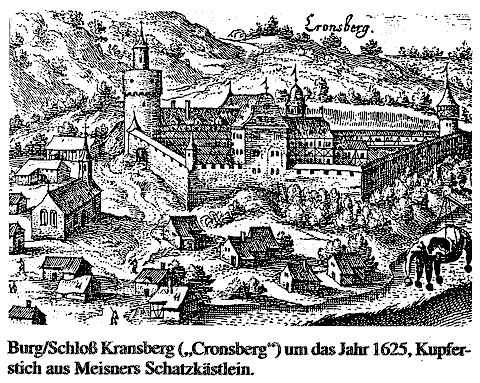
Cransberg Castle around 1625

The original Kransberg castle was constructed around 1170, presumably based on a fortification that dates back to the 11th century. The first documented owner (in 1250) was Erwinus de Cranichesberc (Middle High German for Kranichsberg = crane mountain). In 1310 the castle was sold to Duke Philipp IV. von Falkenstein. It was inherited by the nobility of Eppstein in 1419, and subsequently fell to the Königstein line in the division of 1433. It passed on to the County of Stolberg in 1535, to the Archbishopric of Mainz in 1581, and was sold to the Waldbott von Bassenheim family in 1654.

The castle fell into disrepair from the late 18th century onward until it was sold to the Duchy of Nassau in 1853. It fell to the state of Prussia in 1866 which in 1874 sold it to Arnold von Biegeleben, a Baron from Darmstadt who recreated and extended it in the neogothic style. Only parts of the outward fortifications and the central tower remained essentially unchanged.

== Third Reich ==
Emma von Scheitlein, of Austrian nobility, acquired the castle in 1926 and used it for society events until the Nazi government appropriated it in 1939 and put it to military use.

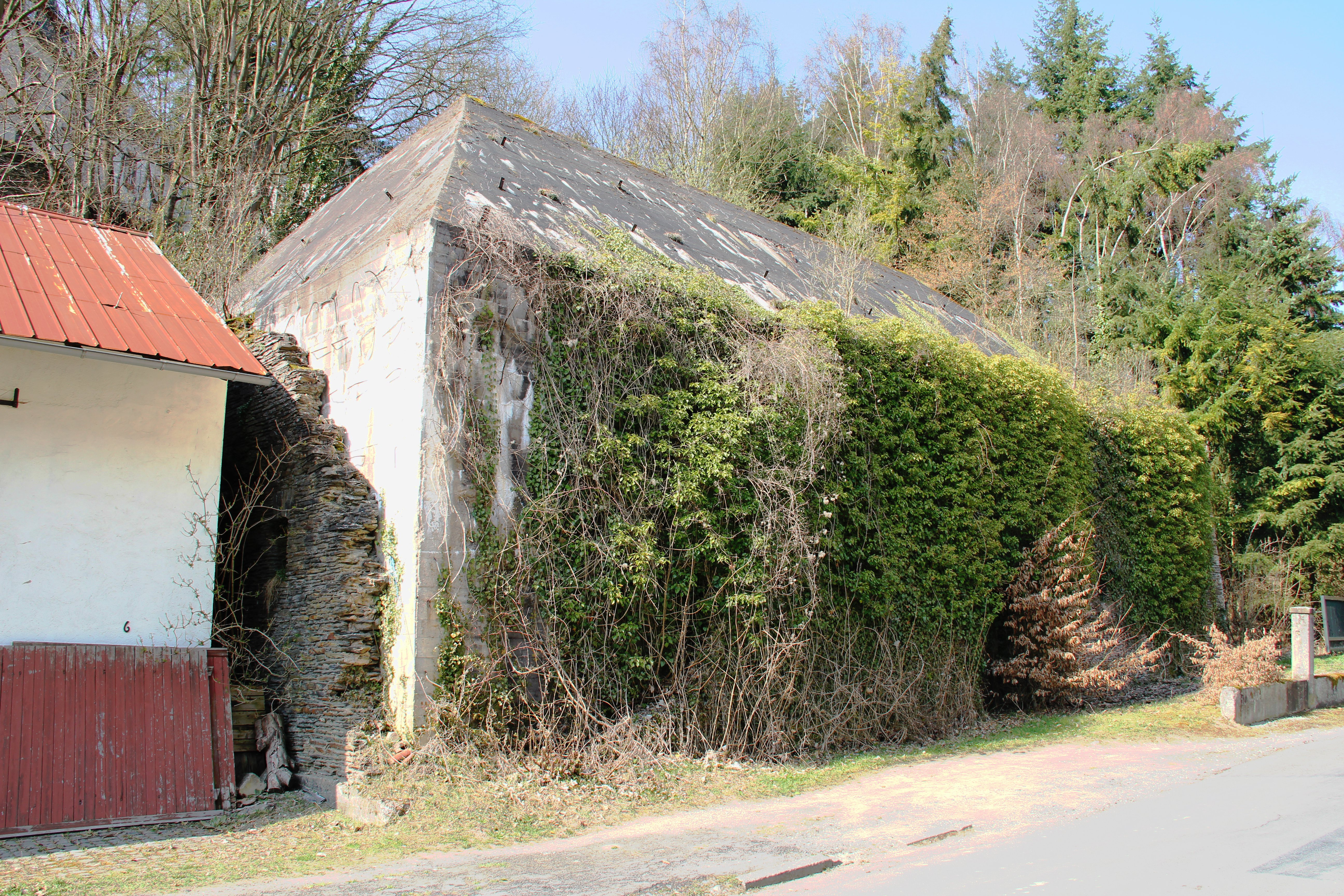
Remains of an alternative guard house to the Adlerhorst complex. Note the slooping roof and scale of the building, and the half demolished stone wall to the left end wall. This entrance complex was originally disguised to look like a Fachwerk (half-timbered) style wooden cottage

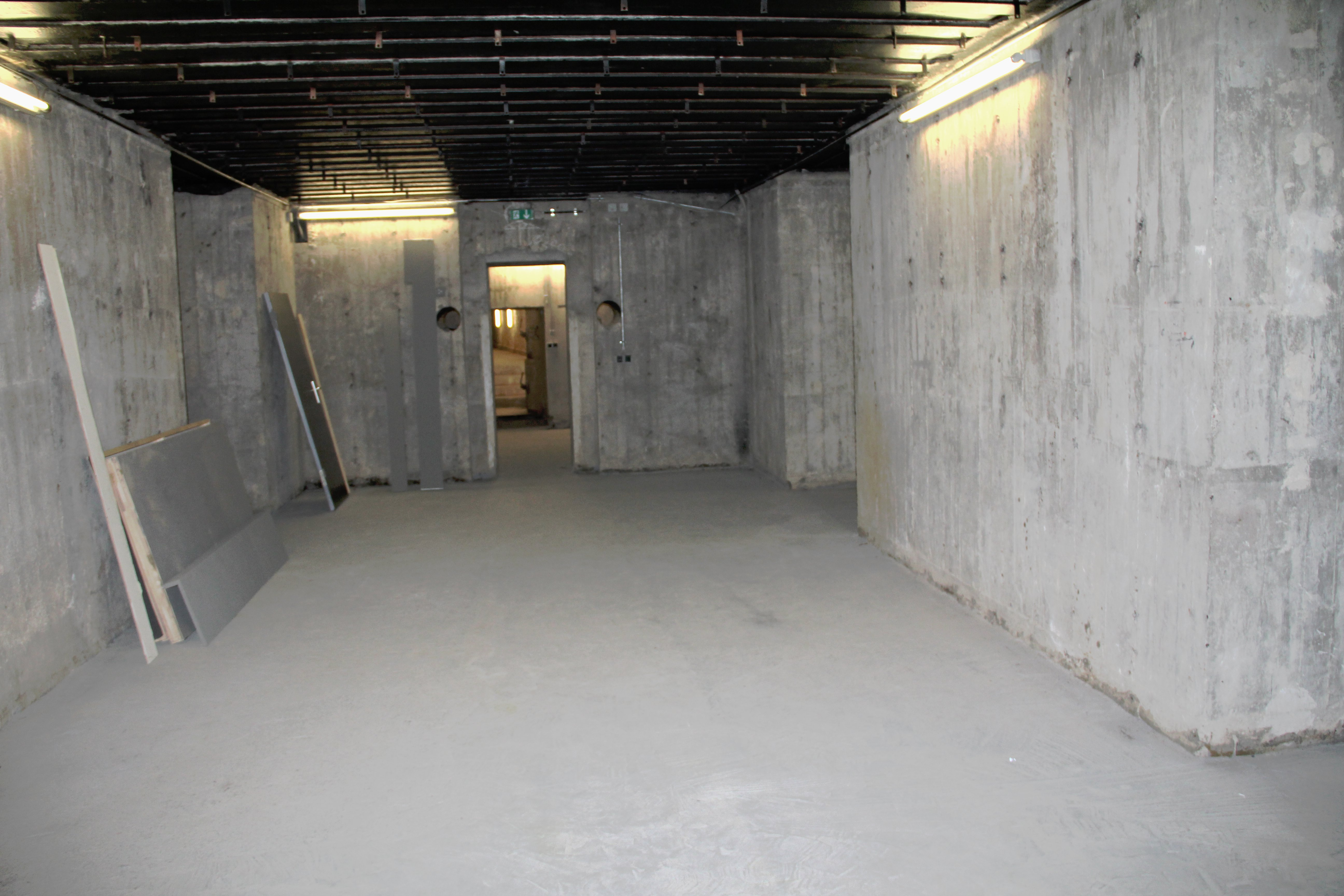
Inside the Adlerhorst bunker under Kransberg Castle

From 1939 to 1941 Albert Speer adapted it for use as Adolf Hitler's main military command headquarters, under the title Adlerhorst. A compound of air-raid standard concrete bunkers were disguised as seven cottages, under which was an extensive bunker complex which linked them to the castle. But on completion the complex was dismissed by Hitler on a visit in February 1940, and Speer subsequently adapted it to serve as the Luftwaffe headquarters during Operation Sea Lion, the invasion of Great Britain. (Some characteristic elements of Speer's architectural style are still apparent in 2010.)

When plans for the invasion of Britain were abandoned in favor of Operation Barbarossa, the invasion of the Soviet Union, Kransberg was put to use as a rehabilitation center for soldiers of all ranks, and as the personal retreat for Hermann Göring.

From October 1944, the castle and Adlerhorst had become the headquarters of the Commander in Chief of OB West, Gerd von Rundstedt. After the failed 20 July plot attempt on Hitler's life, and the abandonment of the Wolfsschanze due to the advances of the Red Army, Hitler needed a new military base of operations for the forthcoming Ardennes Offensive. Hitler arrived at Giessen on the Führersonderzug (train) on 11 December 1944, taking up residence at the castle until 16 January 1945. Von Rundstedt, who was to command Ardennes Offensive, set up his headquarters near Limburg, close enough for the generals and Panzer Corps commanders who were to lead the attack to visit the castle that evening. Von Rundstedt ran through the plans, that at 05:00 on December 15, envisaged the attack of three German armies consisting of over 250,000 men.

Shortly after Christmas, Göring arrived and took up residence in the castle. After an extremely downbeat briefing, Göring privately suggested to Hitler that a truce be sought via his Swedish contacts. Hitler flew into a rage, and after threatening to have Göring put before a firing squad, mentally dismissed him as deputy Fuehrer.

After giving his 1945 New Year's speech from the Adlerhorst, at 04:00 Hitler walked to the command centre to watch the development of Operation Nordwind, his counter-offensive on New Year's Day.

At midnight, nine Panzer divisions of Heeresgruppe G commanded by Generaloberst Johannes Blaskowitz had mounted an all-out attack on Bastogne. Then a faked diversionary attack was mounted by eight German divisions of Army Group Upper Rhine commanded by Heinrich Himmler, against the thinly stretched 110 kilometres (68 mi) line of the U.S. 7th Army and French 1st Army positions near Lembach in the Upper Vosges mountains in Alsace, 120 miles (190 km) to the southeast, to destroy them. However, as the Allies had cracked the Enigma code machines, each German manoeuvre was either prepared for or out-flanked by an allied counter-move. This resulted in a bitter attritional campaign that was lost from the 25th January onwards, by the German's running out of replacement manpower, machinery and supplies.

On 6 January 1945, a blockbuster bomb was jettisoned on Ziegenberg by a returning Allied bomber, damaging the church and several houses, killing four residents. With the Ardennes Offensive failed, and no new military plans or the resources by which to carry them out, the German military high command accepted that the western front was lost. Hitler left on his train for East Prussia on January 16, 1945 to bolster the defenders, with the Soviets having already reached Danzig.

Having been made commander of OB West on March 11, on March 17 Kesselring ordered all classified documents and sensitive equipment removed from the castle. On March 19 the castle and surrounding area was subject to a 45-minute fire bombing air raid by a squadron of P-51 Mustangs. This resulted in the loss of 10 civilian lives, and the castle plus many of the surrounding buildings being damaged, destroyed or set on fire.

On March 28, with the American Army only 12 miles (19 km) away, Kesselring and his troops abandoned the castle complex. A U.S. Army unit took Kransberg Castle on March 30.

During several months of 1945, the castle (under code name Camp Dustbin, from June on) was the Anglo-American interrogation center for Albert Speer and Hjalmar Schacht as well as Wernher von Braun, Ferdinand Porsche, Anton Flettner, and other technical, financial and industrial leaders.

== Cold War ==
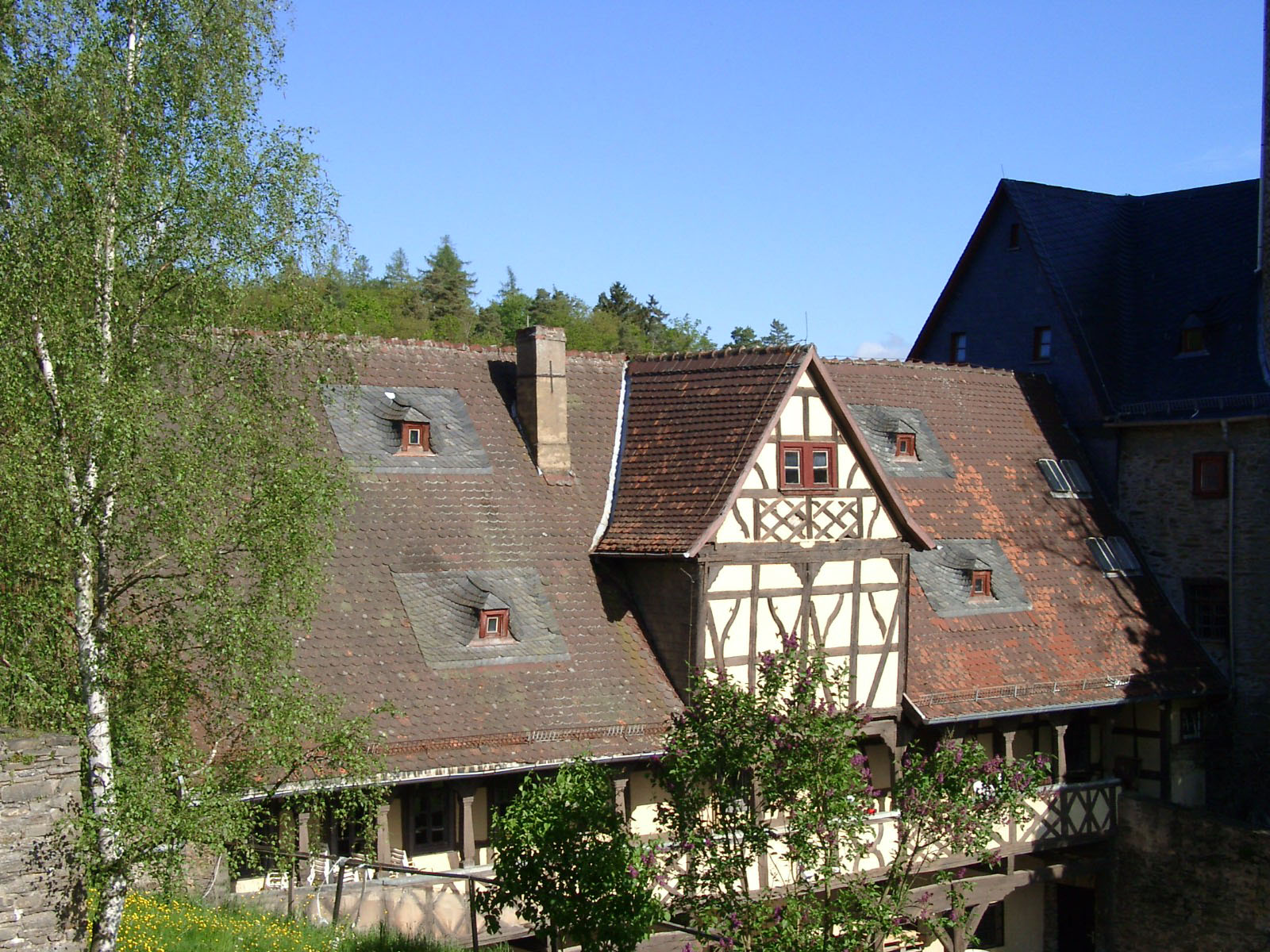
A Fachwerk house in the Kransberg Castle complex

Soon thereafter a British-American detention center, commonly referred to as Camp Dustbin, for high-ranking German non-military prisoners of war, was established in parts of the complex. Focused on key industrialists, scientists and economists, among those interrogated here were Hjalmar Schacht, Wernher von Braun, Ferdinand Porsche, and the leaders of the IG Farben chemical conglomerate. The highest-ranking of these persons of interest was Albert Speer, the minister for armaments and wartime production who was detained in one of the buildings which he had redesigned as Hitler's chief architect a few years earlier. During his detention between June and August 1945 he provided very open and detailed accounts of the inner workings of the Third Reich and the impact of Allied bombing of Germany. "Dustbin" remained in operation throughout 1946.

In 1956 the Organisation Gehlen, the U.S.-German intelligence unit that later became the nucleus of the Bundesnachrichtendienst, moved in. It was later followed by the 5th U.S. Army Corps which operated an NCO academy, and by U.S. intelligence units which directed large parts of its espionage network in communist East Germany from here.

== Late 20th century to present ==
In the wake of the German reunification, the U.S. Army left Kransberg Castle in 1990 and returned it to the German government which sold it to Ulrike Brandis, a granddaughter of the disenfranchised Emma von Scheitlein, in 1993. Once again the complex became a center of culture and societal events. The costs of operating and maintaining the castle forced Brandis to sell her real estate to Klaus Landefeld, an information technology entrepreneur, in 2000. He converted parts of the complex into a business park for IT companies, and initiated the architectural reconversion of those parts that had been disfigured during the period of military use. When Landefeld's business suffered an economic downturn after the dot-com bubble had burst, these efforts were stalled. In 2007 he was forced to cede ownership to a real estate management company, which terminated the remaining business park operation at the end of 2008.

At the end of 2012, Kransberg Castle was sold to a Turkish investor group led by entrepreneur Sebahattin Özkan, with plans to use it as an educational institution. However, urgently needed maintenance measures were not carried out, and the facility fell into disrepair. Since various parts of the wall and a balcony were in danger of collapsing, the Schloßstrasse running below the castle had to be closed temporarily. On March 28, 2014, a fire broke out inside the building, causing significant damage and affecting some ceiling beams, which subsequently had to be supported. As of 2023, Özkan continues to reside in Kransberg himself, and is gradually restoring it room by room on his own initiative. The castle serves as a wedding location with a registry office, and prior to the COVID-19 Pandemic the owner organised classical music concerts with internationally-known artists, which are planned to resume in the future.
