= Lunar Roving Vehicle =

Vehicle driven by astronauts on the Moon (1971–1972)

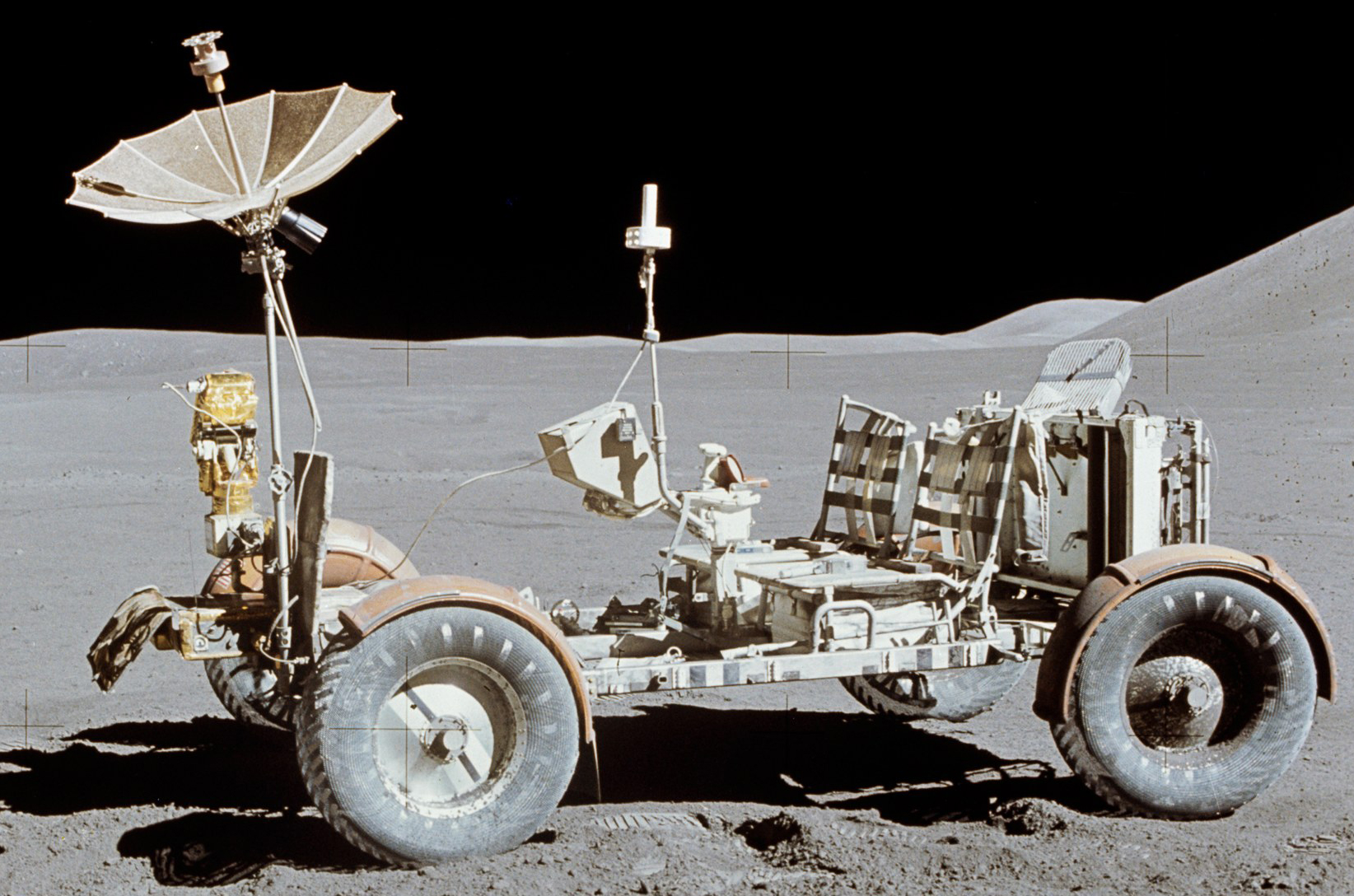
- The U.S. Apollo Lunar Roving Vehicle from Apollo 15 on the Moon in 1971

Overview
- Manufacturer: Boeing; General Motors
- Also called: "Lunar rover"; "Moon buggy"
- Designer: Ferenc Pavlics

Powertrain
- Electric motor: Four 0.25-horsepower (0.19 kW) series-wound DC motors
- Transmission: Four 80:1 harmonic drives
- Battery: Two silver-oxide, 121 A·h
- Range: 57 miles (92 km)

Dimensions
- Wheelbase: 7.5 ft (2.3 m)
- Length: 10 ft (3.0 m)
- Height: 3.6 feet (1.1 m)
- Curb weight: 460 pounds (210 kg) on Earth; 76 pounds-force (34 kgf) on the Moon

Chronology
- Successor: Lunar Terrain Vehicle

The Lunar Roving Vehicle (LRV) is a battery-powered four-wheeled rover used on the Moon in the last three missions of the American Apollo program (15, 16, and 17) during 1971 and 1972. It is popularly called the Moon buggy, a play on the term "dune buggy".

Built by Boeing, each LRV has a mass of 462 pounds (210 kg) without payload. It could carry a maximum payload of 970 pounds (440 kg), including two astronauts, equipment, and cargo such as lunar samples, and was designed for a top speed of 6 miles per hour (10 km/h; 3 m/s), although it achieved a top speed of 11.2 miles per hour (18 km/h; 5 m/s) on its last mission, Apollo 17.

Each LRV was carried to the Moon folded up in the Lunar Module's Quadrant 1 Bay. After being unpacked, each was driven an average of 20 miles (30 km), without major incident. These three LRVs remain on the Moon.

== History ==
=== Conceptual precursors ===
The concept of a wheeled vehicle for lunar surface travel appeared in science fiction decades before the Apollo program. In Polish writer Jerzy Żuławski's first volume of his novel series The Lunar Trilogy, On the Silver Globe, published in 1903, explorers on the Moon construct and use an electrically powered, wheeled vehicle with an enclosed cabin capable of carrying a crew and supplies. This is regarded as one of the earliest depictions of a practical lunar rover.

The lunar rover concept also predated the Apollo program in non-fiction speculative work. In a 1952–1954 series in Collier's Weekly magazine titled "Man Will Conquer Space Soon!", Wernher von Braun and others (including astronomer Fred Lawrence Whipple and science writer Willy Ley) described a six-week stay on the Moon that featured ten-ton tractor-trailers for moving supplies.

Polish engineer Mieczysław G. Bekker, who later played a central role in developing the mobility system of the Lunar Roving Vehicle, read Żuławski's novel frequently as a child and was influenced by its description of the lunar vehicle. In 1956 and 1962, while a University of Michigan professor and a consultant to the U.S. Army Tank-Automotive Command's Land Locomotion Laboratory, Bekker published two books on land locomotion.

In 1959, Georg von Tiesenhausen conceived the lunar rover as a four-wheel-drive vehicle with noninflated, flexible wheels.

=== Early lunar mobility studies ===
In the February 1964 issue of Popular Science, von Braun, then director of NASA's Marshall Space Flight Center (MSFC), discussed the need for a lunar surface vehicle, and revealed that studies had been underway at Marshall in conjunction with Lockheed, Bendix, Boeing, General Motors, Brown Engineering, Grumman, and Bell Aerospace. Saverio Morea was named LRV Manager at MSFC in 1961.

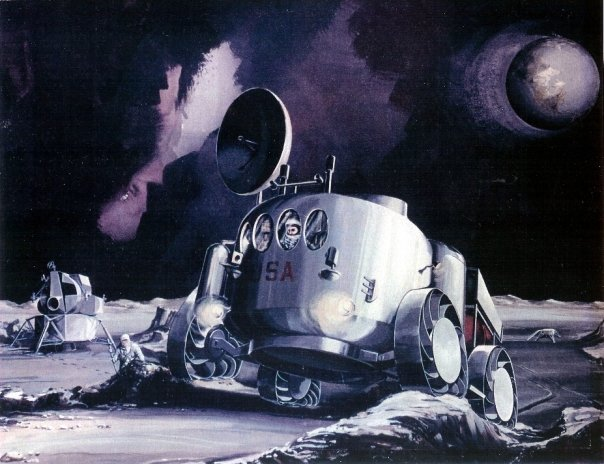
MOLAB, NASA Illustration, 1960

Beginning in the early 1960s, a series of studies centering on lunar mobility were conducted under Marshall. This began with the lunar logistics system (LLS), followed by the mobility laboratory (MOLAB), then the lunar scientific survey module (LSSM), and finally the mobility test article (MTA). In early planning for the Apollo program, it had been assumed that two Saturn V launch vehicles would be used for each lunar mission: one for sending the crew aboard a Lunar Surface Module (LSM) to lunar orbit, landing, and returning, and a second for sending an LSM-Truck (LSM-T) with all of the equipment, supplies, and transport vehicle for use by the crew while on the surface. All of the first Marshall studies were based on this dual-launch assumption, allowing a large, heavy, roving vehicle.

Grumman and Northrop, in late 1962, began to design pressurized-cabin vehicles, with electric motors for each wheel. At about this same time, Bendix and Boeing started their internal studies on lunar transportation systems. Mieczysław Bekker, now with General Motors Defense Research Laboratories at Santa Barbara, California, was completing a study for NASA's Jet Propulsion Laboratory on a small, uncrewed lunar roving vehicle for the Surveyor program. Ferenc Pavlics, originally from Hungary, used a wire-mesh design for "resilient wheels," a design that would be followed in future small rovers.

In early 1963, NASA selected Marshall for studies in an Apollo Logistics Support System (ALSS). Following reviews of all earlier efforts, this resulted in a 10-volume report. Included was the need for a pressurized vehicle in the 6,490–8,470 lb (2,940–3,840 kg) weight range, accommodating two men with their expendables and instruments for traverses up to two weeks in duration. In June 1964, Marshall awarded contracts to Bendix and Boeing, with GM's lab designated as the vehicle technology subcontractor. Bell Aerospace was already under contract for studies of Lunar Flying Vehicles.

Even as the Bendix and Boeing studies were underway, Marshall was examining a less ambitious surface exploration activity, the LSSM. This would be composed of a fixed, habitable shelter–laboratory with a small lunar-traversing vehicle that could either carry one man or be remotely controlled. This mission would still require a dual launch with the moon vehicle carried on the "lunar truck". Marshall's Propulsion and Vehicle Engineering (P&VE) lab contracted with Hayes International to make a preliminary study of the shelter and its related vehicle. Because of the potential need for an enclosed vehicle for enlarged future lunar explorations, those design efforts continued for some time and resulted in several full-scale test vehicles.

With pressure from Congress to hold down Apollo costs, Saturn V production was reduced, allowing only a single launch per mission. Any roving vehicle would have to fit on the same lunar module as the astronauts. In November 1964, two-rocket models were put on indefinite hold, but Bendix and Boeing were given study contracts for small rovers. The name of the lunar excursion module was changed to simply the Lunar Module, indicating that the capability for powered "excursions" away from a lunar-lander base did not yet exist. There could be no mobile lab—the astronauts would work out of the LM. Marshall also continued to examine uncrewed robotic rovers that could be controlled from the Earth.

From the beginnings at Marshall, the Brown Engineering Company of Huntsville, Alabama, had participated in all of the lunar mobility efforts. In 1965, Brown became the prime support contractor for Marshall's P&VE Laboratory. With an urgent need to determine the feasibility of a two-man self-contained lander, von Braun bypassed the usual procurement process and had P&VE's Advanced Studies Office directly task Brown to design, build, and test a prototype vehicle. While Bendix and Boeing would continue to refine concepts and designs for a lander, test model rovers were vital for Marshall human factors studies involving spacesuit-clad astronauts interfacing with power, telemetry, navigation, and life-support rover equipment.

Brown's team made full use of the earlier small-rover studies, and commercially available components were incorporated wherever possible. The selection of wheels was of great importance, and almost nothing was known at that time about the lunar surface. The Marshall Space Sciences Laboratory (SSL) was responsible for predicting surface properties, and Brown was also prime support contractor for this lab; Brown set up a test area to examine a wide variety of wheel-surface conditions. To simulate Pavlics's "resilient wheel," a four-foot-diameter inner tube wrapped with nylon ski rope was used. On the small test rover, each wheel had a small electric motor, with overall power provided by standard truck batteries. A roll bar gave protection from overturning accidents.

In early 1966, Brown's vehicle became available for examining human factors and other testing. Marshall built a small test track with craters and rock debris where several different mock-ups were compared; it became obvious that a small rover would be best for the proposed missions. The test vehicle was also operated in remote mode to determine characteristics that might be dangerous to the driver, such as acceleration, bounce-height, and turn-over tendency as it traveled at higher speeds and over simulated obstacles. The test rover's performance under one-sixth gravity was obtained through flights on a KC-135A aircraft in a Reduced Gravity parabolic maneuver; among other things, the need for a very soft wheel and suspension combination was shown. Although Pavlics' wire-mesh wheels were not initially available for the reduced gravity tests, the mesh wheels were tested on various soils at the Waterways Experiment Station of the U.S. Army Corps of Engineers at Vicksburg, Mississippi. Later, when wire-mesh wheels were tested on low-g flights, the need for wheel fenders to reduce dust contamination was found. The model was also extensively tested at the U.S. Army's Yuma Proving Ground in Arizona, as well as the Army's Aberdeen Proving Ground in Maryland.

=== Lunar Roving Vehicle Project ===
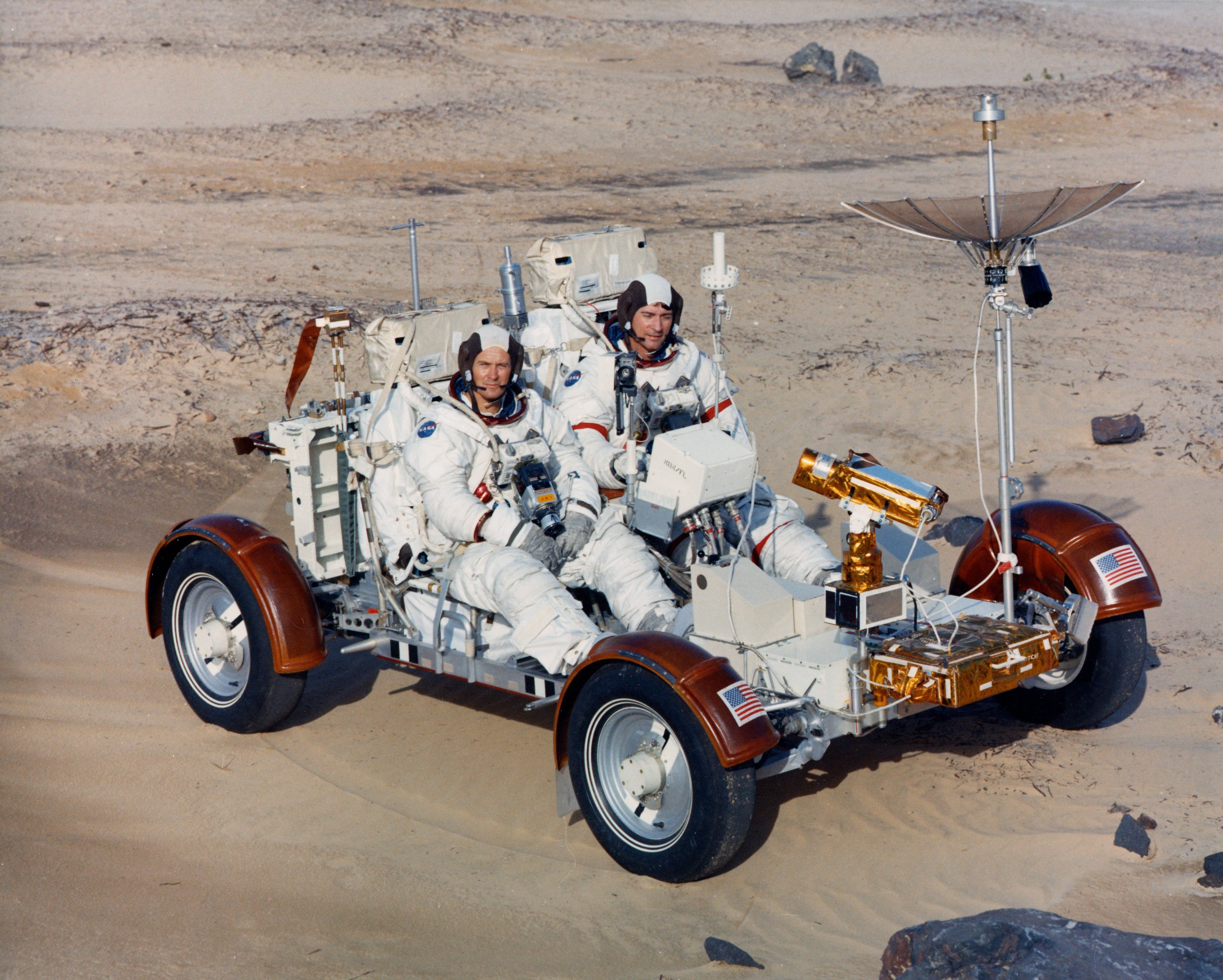
Apollo 16 astronauts in the 1-g trainer

During 1965 and 1967, the Summer Conference on Lunar Exploration and Science brought together leading scientists to assess NASA's planning for exploring the Moon and to make recommendations. One of their findings was that the LSSM was critical to a successful program and should be given major attention. At Marshall, von Braun established a Lunar Roving Task Team, and in May 1969, NASA approved the Manned Lunar Rover Vehicle Program as a Marshall hardware development. The project was led by Eberhard Rees, Director of Research and Development at Marshall, who oversaw the design and construction of the rover, with Saverio Morea acting as project manager.

On 11 July 1969, just before the successful Moon landing of Apollo 11, a request for proposal for the final development and building the Apollo LRV was released by Marshall. Boeing, Bendix, Grumman, and Chrysler submitted proposals. Following three months of proposal evaluation and negotiations, Boeing was selected as the Apollo LRV prime contractor on 28 October 1969. Boeing would manage the LRV project under Henry Kudish in Huntsville, Alabama. Kudish was replaced the following year in 1970 by LRV Project Manager Earl Houtz. As a major subcontractor, the General Motors Defense Research Laboratories in Santa Barbara, California, would furnish the mobility system (wheels, motors, and suspension); this effort would be led by GM Program Manager Samuel Romano and Ferenc Pavlics. Boeing in Seattle, Washington, would furnish the electronics and navigation system. Vehicle testing would take place at the Boeing facility in Kent, Washington, and the chassis manufacturing and overall assembly would be completed at the Boeing facility in Huntsville.

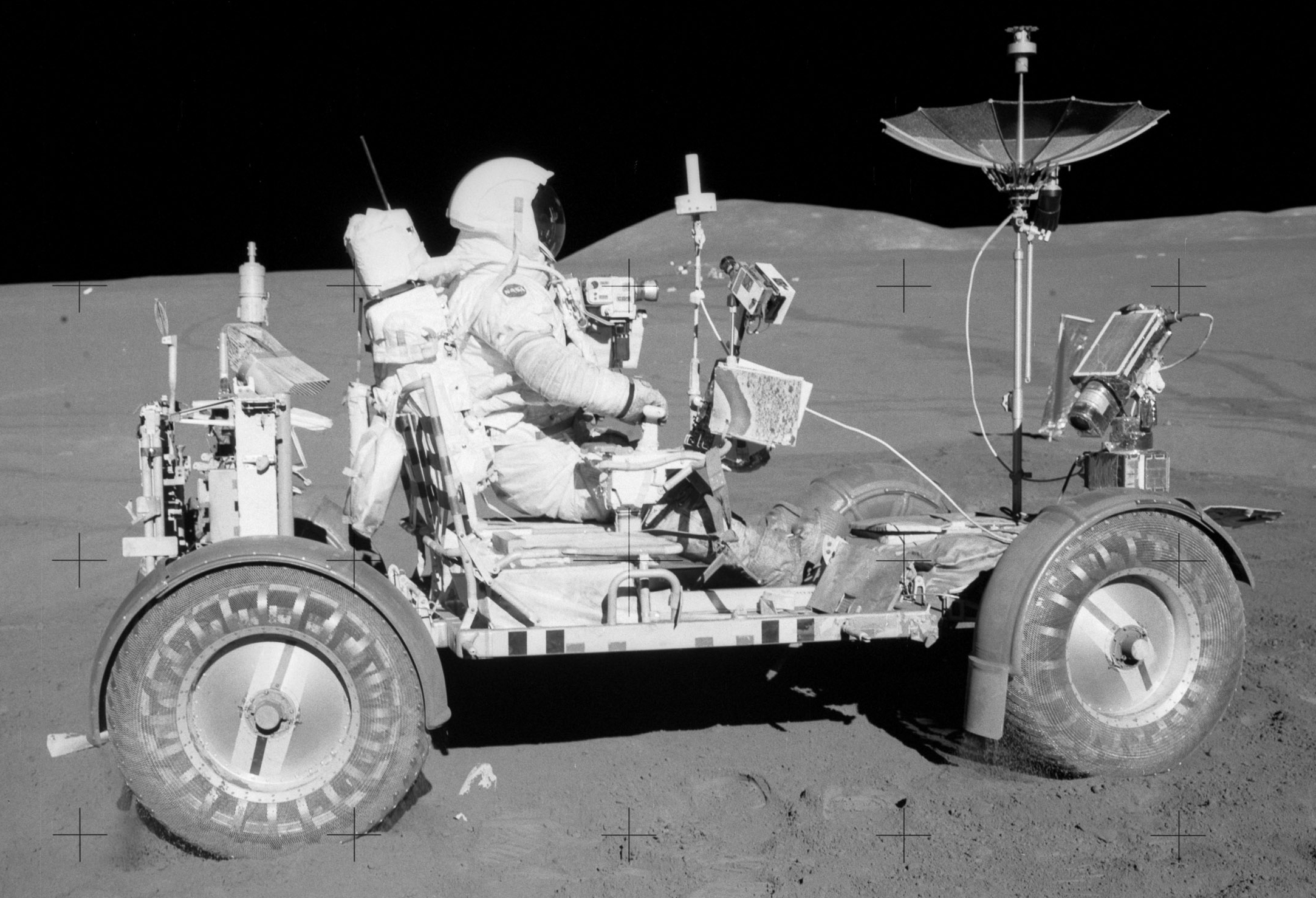
Apollo 15 – Commander David Scott drives the Rover near the LM Falcon

The first cost-plus-incentive-fee contract to Boeing was for $19 million and called for delivery of the first LRV by 1 April 1971. Cost overruns, however, led to a final cost of $38 million (equal to $302 million today), which was about the same as NASA's original estimate. Four lunar rovers were built, one each for Apollo missions 15, 16, and 17; and one used for spare parts after the cancellation of further Apollo missions. Other LRV models were built: a static model to assist with human factors design; an engineering model to design and integrate the subsystems; two one-sixth gravity models for testing the deployment mechanism; a one-gravity trainer to give the astronauts instruction in the operation of the rover and allow them to practice driving it; a mass model to test the effect of the rover on the LM structure, balance, and handling; a vibration test unit to study the LRV's durability and handling of launch stresses; and a qualification test unit to study integration of all LRV subsystems. A paper by Saverio Morea gives details of the LRV system and its development.

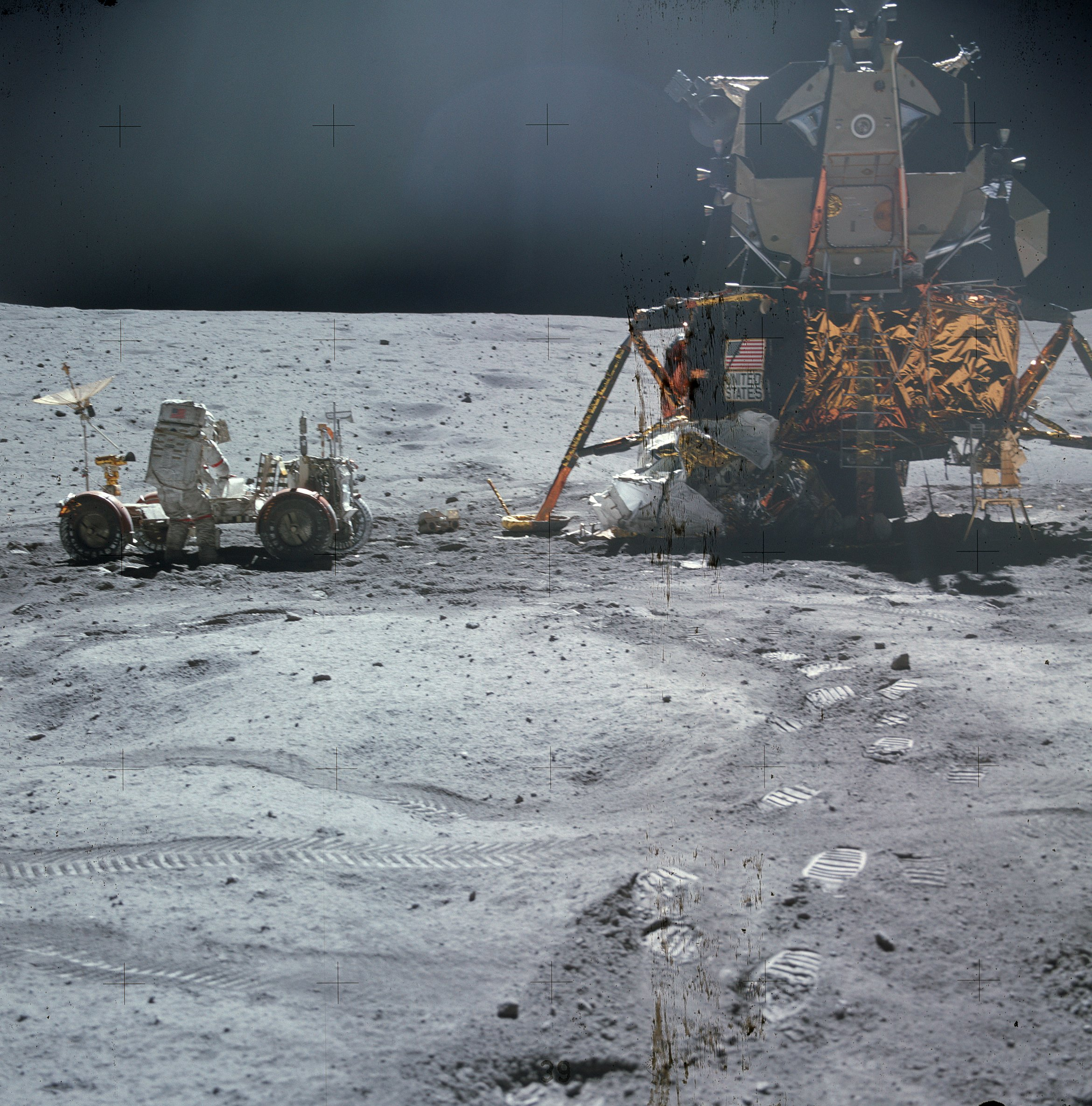
John Young works at the LRV near the LM Orion on Apollo 16 in April 1972.

LRVs were used for greater surface mobility during the Apollo J-class missions, Apollo 15, Apollo 16, and Apollo 17. The rover was first used on 31 July 1971, during the Apollo 15 mission. This greatly expanded the range of the lunar explorers. Previous teams of astronauts were restricted to short walking distances around the landing site due to the bulky space suit equipment required to sustain life in the lunar environment. The range, however, was operationally restricted to remain within walking distance of the lunar module, in case the rover broke down at any point. The rovers were designed with a top speed of about 8 mph (13 km/h), although Eugene Cernan recorded a maximum speed of 11.2 mph (18.0 km/h), giving him the (unofficial) lunar land-speed record.

The LRV was developed in only 17 months and performed all its functions on the Moon with no major anomalies. Scientist-astronaut Harrison Schmitt of Apollo 17 said, "The Lunar Rover proved to be the reliable, safe and flexible lunar exploration vehicle we expected it to be. Without it, the major scientific discoveries of Apollo 15, 16, and 17 would not have been possible; and our current understanding of lunar evolution would not have been possible."

The LRVs experienced some minor problems. The rear fender extension on the Apollo 16 LRV was lost during the mission's second extra-vehicular activity (EVA) at station 8 when John Young bumped into it while going to assist Charles Duke. The dust thrown up from the wheel covered the crew, the console, and the communications equipment. High battery temperatures and resulting high power consumption ensued. No repair attempt was mentioned.

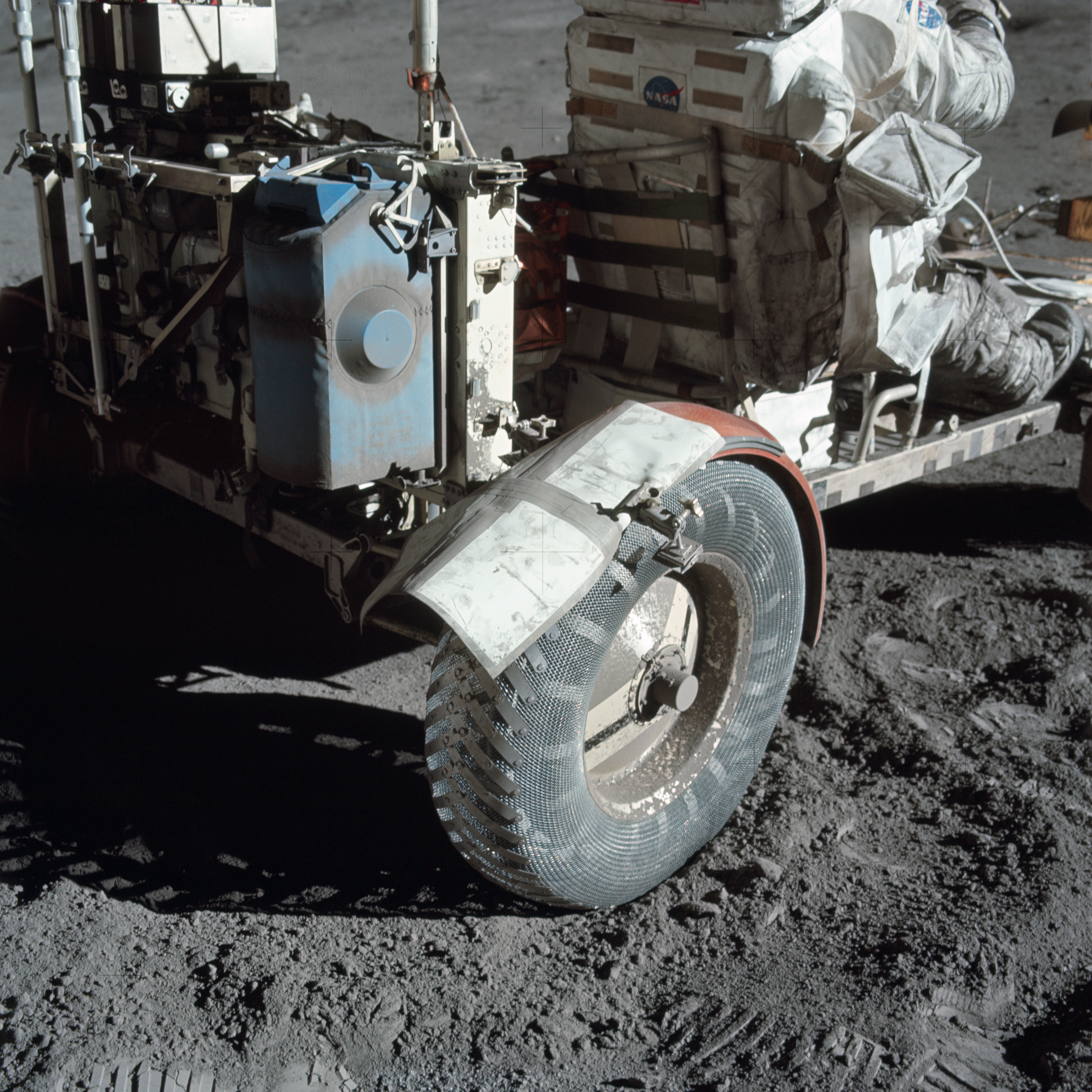
Mended fender of the Apollo 17 rover, after having been damaged by a hammer and too much dust got kicked up

The fender extension on the Apollo 17 LRV broke when accidentally bumped by Eugene Cernan with a hammer handle. Cernan and Schmitt taped the extension back in place, but due to the dusty surfaces, the tape did not adhere, and the extension was lost after about one hour of driving, causing the astronauts to be covered with dust. For their second EVA, a replacement "fender" was made with some EVA maps, duct tape, and a pair of clamps from inside the Lunar Module that were nominally intended for the moveable overhead light. This repair was later undone so that the clamps could be taken inside for the return launch. The maps were brought back to Earth and are now on display at the National Air and Space Museum. The abrasion from the dust is evident on some portions of the makeshift fender.

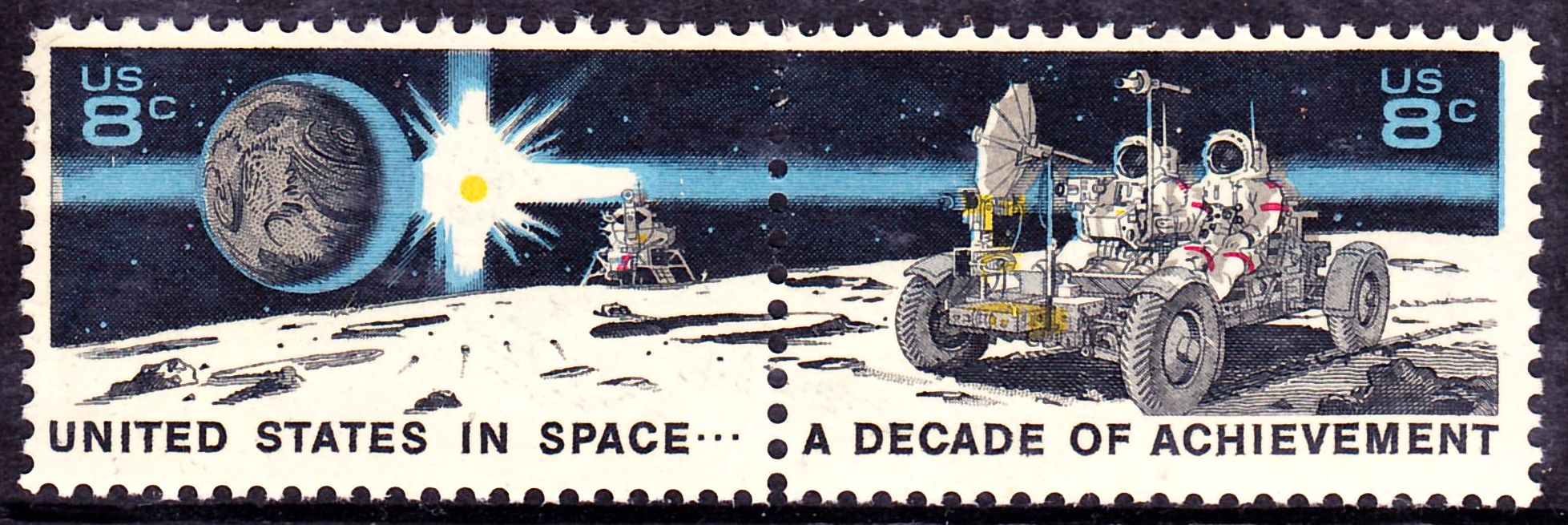
The Lunar Rover Vehicle depicted on the Space Achievement Decade Issue of 1971

The color TV camera mounted on the front of the LRV could be remotely operated by Mission Control in pan and tilt axes as well as zoom. This allowed far better television coverage of the EVA than the earlier missions. On each mission, at the conclusion of the astronauts' stay on the surface, the commander drove the LRV to a position away from the Lunar Module so that the camera could record the ascent stage launch. The camera operator in Mission Control experienced difficulty in timing the various delays so that the LM ascent stage was in frame through the launch. On the third and final attempt (Apollo 17), the launch and ascent were successfully tracked.

NASA's rovers, left behind, are among the artificial objects on the Moon, as are the Soviet Union's uncrewed rovers, Lunokhod 1 and Lunokhod 2.

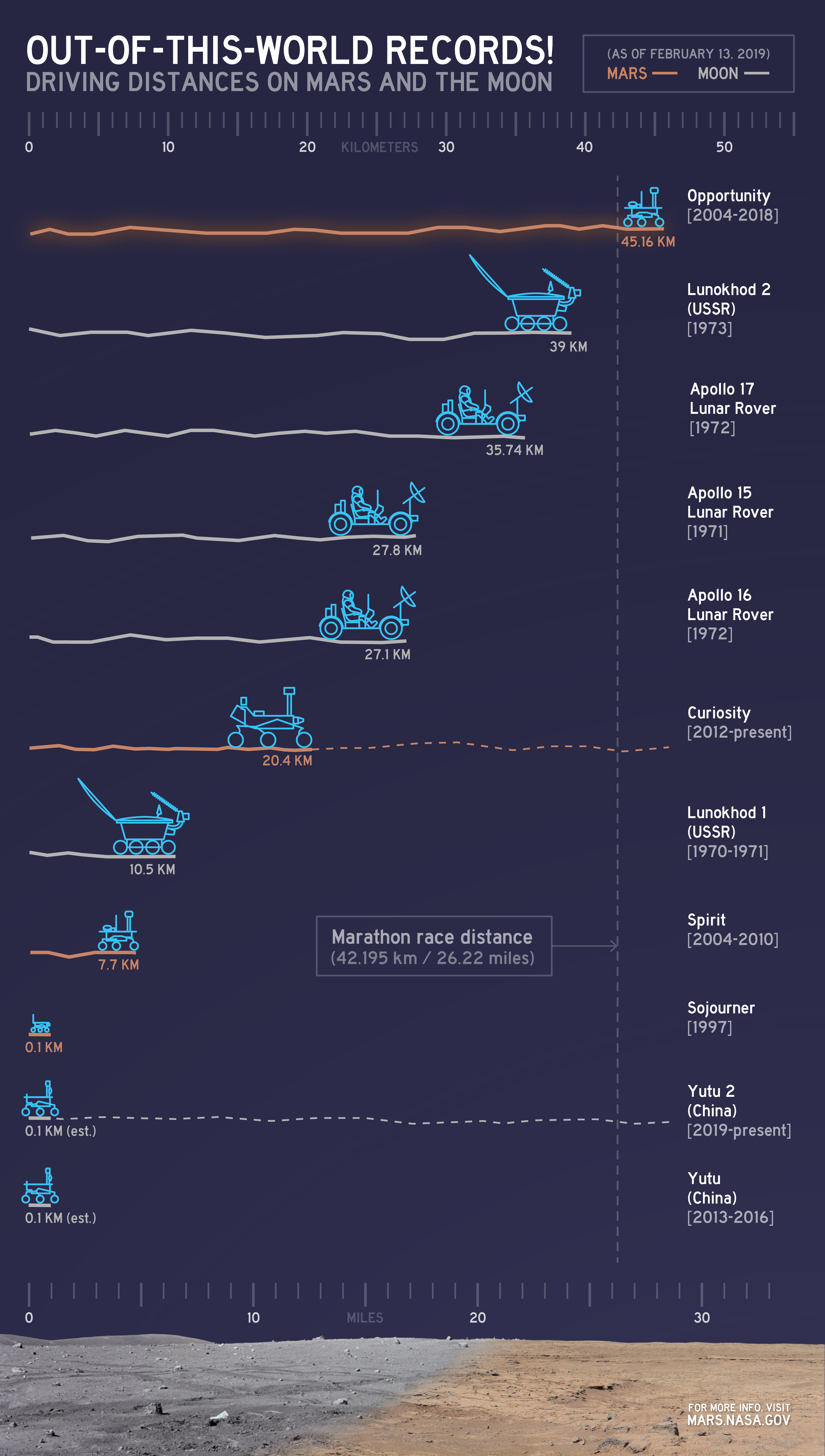
Comparison of distances driven by various wheeled vehicles on the surface of the Moon and Mars

== Features and specifications ==
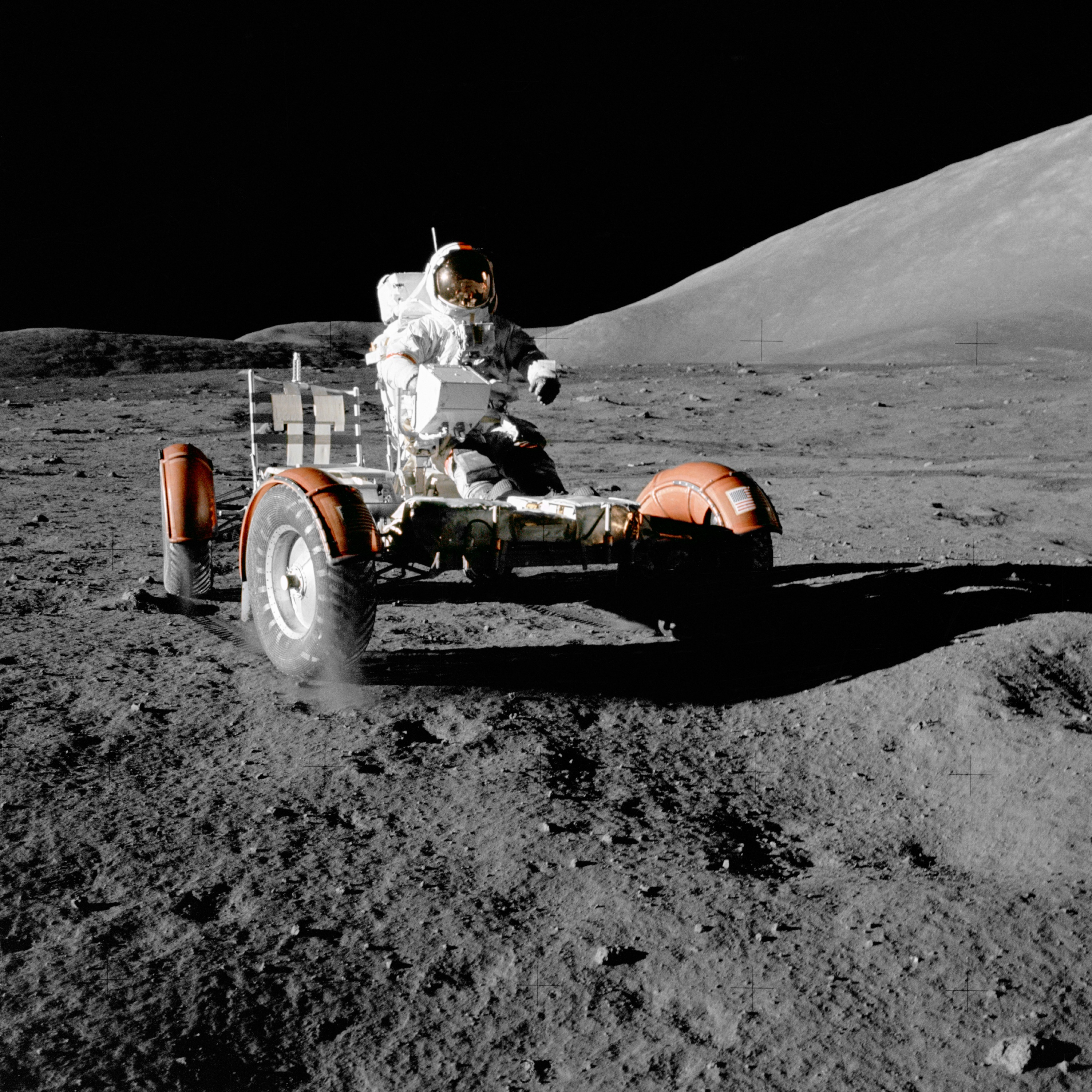
Eugene Cernan test-drives the Apollo 17 lunar rover shortly after unloading it from the LM Challenger.

The Apollo Lunar Roving Vehicle is a battery electric vehicle designed to operate in the low-gravity vacuum of the Moon and to be capable of traversing the lunar surface, allowing the Apollo astronauts to extend the range of their surface extravehicular activities. Three LRVs were used on the Moon: one on Apollo 15 by astronauts David Scott and Jim Irwin, one on Apollo 16 by John Young and Charles Duke, and one on Apollo 17 by Eugene Cernan and Harrison Schmitt. The mission commander served as the driver, occupying the left-hand seat of each LRV. Features are available in papers by Morea, Baker, and Kudish.

=== Mass and payload ===
The Lunar Roving Vehicles have a mass of 460 pounds (210 kg), and were designed to hold an additional payload of 510 pounds (230 kg). This resulted in weights in the approximately one-sixth g on the lunar surface of 77 pounds-force (35 kgf) empty (curb weight) and 160 pounds-force (73 kgf) fully loaded (gross vehicle weight). The vehicle frame is 10 feet (3.0 m) long with a wheelbase of 7.5 feet (2.3 m). The height of the vehicles is 3.6 feet (1.1 m). The frame is made of 2219 aluminum alloy tubing welded assemblies and consisted of a three-part chassis that was hinged in the center so it could be folded up and hung in the Lunar Module Quadrant 1 bay, which was kept open to space by omission of the outer skin panel. They have two side-by-side foldable seats made of tubular aluminum with nylon webbing and aluminum floor panels. An armrest was mounted between the seats, and each seat had adjustable footrests and a Velcro-fastened seat belt. A large mesh dish antenna was mounted on a mast on the front center of the rover. The suspension consists of a double horizontal wishbone with upper and lower torsion bars and a damper unit between the chassis and upper wishbone. Fully loaded, the LRV has a ground clearance of 14 inches (36 cm).

=== Wheels and power ===
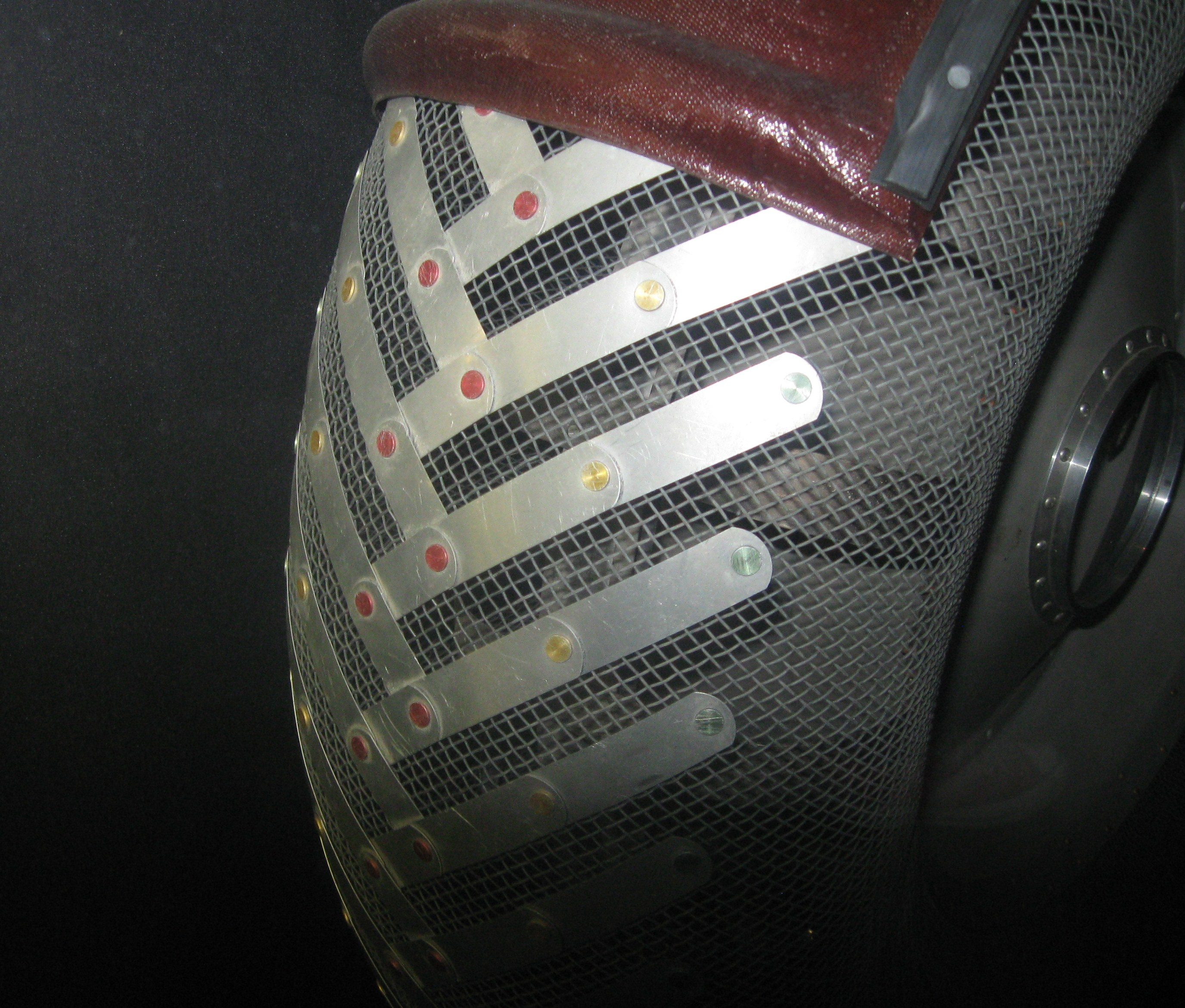
Close-up of wheel showing chevron treads

The wheels were designed and manufactured by General Motors Defense Research Laboratories in Santa Barbara, California. Ferenc Pavlics was given special recognition by NASA for developing the "resilient wheel". They consisted of a spun aluminum hub and a 32-inch-diameter (81 cm), 9-inch-wide (23 cm) tire made of zinc-coated woven 0.033-inch-diameter (0.84 mm) steel strands attached to the rim. Titanium chevrons covered 50% of the contact area to provide traction. Inside the tire was a 25.5-inch-diameter (65 cm) titanium bump stop frame to protect the hub. Dust guards were mounted above the wheels. Each wheel had its own electric drive made by Delco, a brushed DC electric motor capable of 0.25 horsepower (190 W) at 10,000 rpm, attached to the wheel via an 80:1 harmonic drive, and a mechanical brake unit. In the case of drive failure, astronauts could remove pins to disengage the drive from the wheel, allowing the wheel to spin freely.

Maneuvering capability was provided through the use of front and rear steering motors. Each series-wound DC steering motor was capable of 0.1 horsepower (75 W). The front and rear wheels could pivot in opposite directions to achieve a tight turning radius of 10 feet (3 m), or could be decoupled so only front or rear would be used for steering. The wheels were linked in Ackermann steering geometry, where the inside tires have a greater turn angle than the outside tires, to avoid sideslip.

Power was provided by two 36-volt silver-zinc potassium hydroxide non-rechargeable batteries developed by Eagle-Picher with a charge capacity of 121 A·h each (a total of 242 A·h), yielding a range of 57 miles (92 km). These were used to power the drive and steering motors and also a 36-volt utility outlet mounted on the front of the LRV to power the communications relay unit or the TV camera. LRV batteries and electronics were passively cooled, using change-of-phase wax thermal capacitor packages and reflective, upward-facing radiating surfaces. While driving, radiators were covered with mylar blankets to minimize dust accumulation. When stopped, the astronauts would open the blankets, and manually remove excess dust from the cooling surfaces with hand brushes.

=== Control and navigation ===
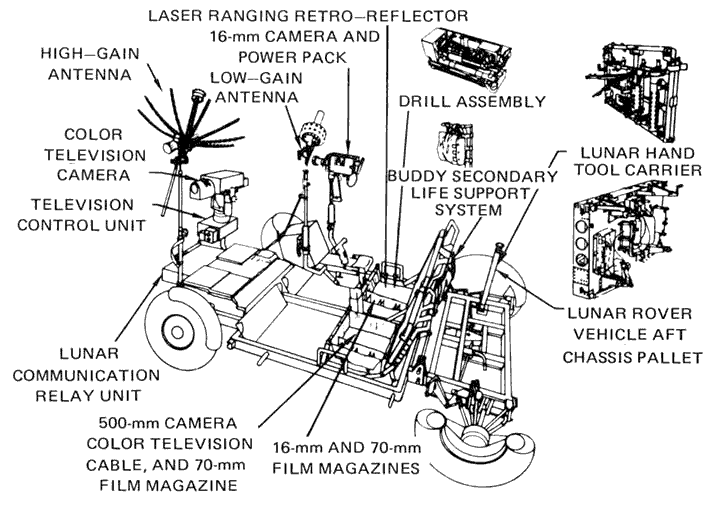
Lunar Rover diagram (NASA)

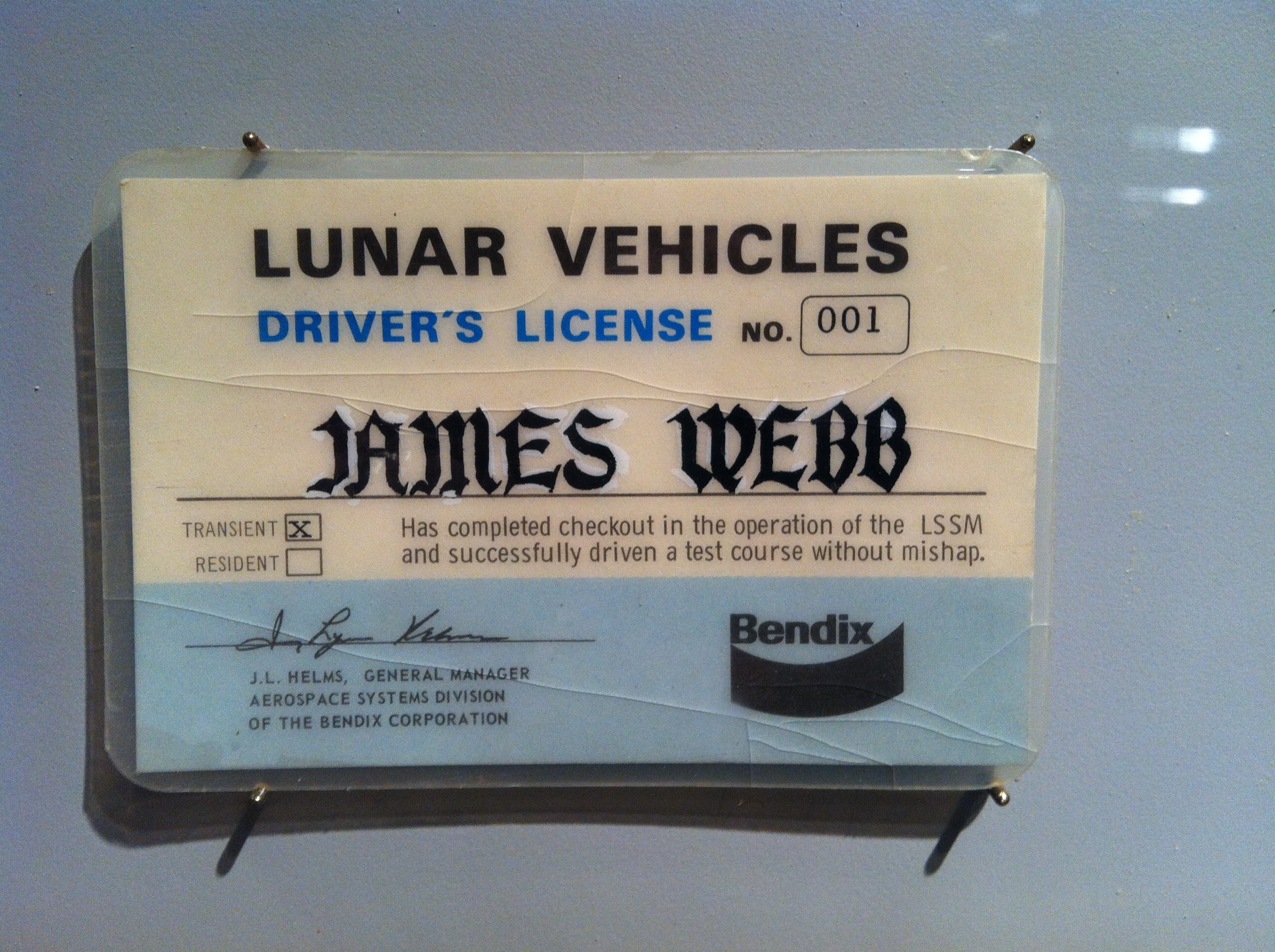
Honorary lunar driver's license presented to then–NASA-Administrator James E. Webb

A T-shaped hand controller situated between the two seats controlled the four drive motors, two steering motors, and brakes. Moving the stick forward powered the LRV forward, left and right turned the vehicle left or right, and pulling backwards activated the brakes. Activating a switch on the handle before pulling back would put the LRV into reverse. Pulling the handle all the way back activated a parking brake. The control and display modules were situated in front of the handle and gave information on the speed, heading, pitch, and power and temperature levels.

Navigation was based on continuously recording direction and distance through use of a directional gyro and odometer and feeding this data to a computer that would keep track of the overall direction and distance back to the LM. There was also a Sun-shadow device that could give a manual heading based on the direction of the Sun, using the fact that the Sun moves very slowly in the lunar sky (about 1/2° per hour).

== Usage ==
The LRV was used during the lunar surface operations of Apollo 15, 16 and 17, the J missions of the Apollo program. On each mission, the LRV was used on three separate EVAs, for a total of nine lunar traverses, or sorties. During operation, the commander (CDR) always drove, while the Lunar Module Pilot (LMP) was a passenger who assisted with navigation.

Mission	Total distance	Total time	Longest single traverse	Maximum range from the LM
Apollo 15 (LRV-1)	17.25 miles (27.76 km)	3 h 02 min	7.75 miles (12.47 km)	3.1 miles (5.0 km)
Apollo 16 (LRV-2)	16.50 miles (26.55 km)	3 h 26 min	7.20 miles (11.59 km)	2.8 miles (4.5 km)
Apollo 17 (LRV-3)	22.30 miles (35.89 km)	4 h 26 min	12.50 miles (20.12 km)	4.7 miles (7.6 km)

An operational constraint on the use of the LRV was that the astronauts must be able to walk back to the LM if the LRV were to fail at any time during the EVA (called the "Walkback Limit"). Thus, the traverses were limited in the distance they could go at the start and at any time later in the EVA. Therefore, they went to the farthest point away from the LM and worked their way back to it so that, as the life support consumables were depleted, their remaining walk back distance was equally diminished. This constraint was relaxed during the longest traverse on Apollo 17, based on the demonstrated reliability of the LRV and spacesuits on previous missions. A paper by Burkhalter and Sharp provides details on usage.

=== Deployment ===
LRV extraction timelapse from Apollo 15, 1971

Aboard the Lunar Roving Vehicle during the Apollo 15 mission

Astronaut deployment of the Lunar Roving Vehicle from the LM's open Quadrant 1 bay was achieved with a system of pulleys and braked reels using ropes and cloth tapes. The rover was folded and stored in the bay with the underside of the chassis facing out. One astronaut would climb the egress ladder on the LM and release the rover, which would then be slowly tilted out by the second astronaut on the ground through the use of reels and tapes. As the rover was let down from the bay, most of the deployment was automatic. The rear wheels folded out and locked in place. When they touched the ground, the front of the rover could be unfolded, the wheels deployed, and the entire frame let down to the surface by pulleys.

The rover components locked into place upon opening. Cabling, pins, and tripods would then be removed and the seats and footrests raised. After switching on all the electronics, the vehicle was ready to back away from the LM.

=== Locations ===
Four flight-ready LRVs were manufactured, as well as several others for testing and training. Three were transported to and left on the Moon via the Apollo 15, 16, and 17 missions (LRV-1 to 3), with the fourth (LRV-4) used for spare parts for the first three following the cancellation of Apollo 18.

The rover used on Apollo 15 was left at Hadley-Apennine (26.10°N 3.65°E). The rover used on Apollo 16 was left at Descartes (8.99°S 15.51°E). The rover used on Apollo 17 was left at Taurus-Littrow (20.16°N 30.76°E) and was seen by the Lunar Reconnaissance Orbiter during passes in 2009 and 2011. In 2020, the State of Washington designated the flown rovers as historic landmarks.

Since only the upper stages of the lunar excursion modules could return to lunar orbit from the surface, the vehicles, along with the lower stages were abandoned. As a result, the only lunar rovers on display are LRV-4, test vehicles, trainers, and mock-ups.

- Lunar Roving Vehicle 4 (LRV-4) is on display at the Kennedy Space Center Visitors Complex in Cape Canaveral, Florida.
- The Engineering Mockup, intended to design and integrate subsystems, is on display at the Museum of Flight in Seattle, Washington.
- The Qualification Test Unit, designed to study integration of all LRV subsystems, is on display at the National Air and Space Museum in Washington, D.C.
- The Vibration Test Unit, intended to study durability and handling of launch stresses, is on display in the Davidson Saturn V Center at the U.S. Space & Rocket Center in Huntsville, Alabama.
- The 1-gravity Trainer is on display at the Johnson Space Center in Houston, Texas.
Lunar Roving Vehicles, test vehicles and trainers

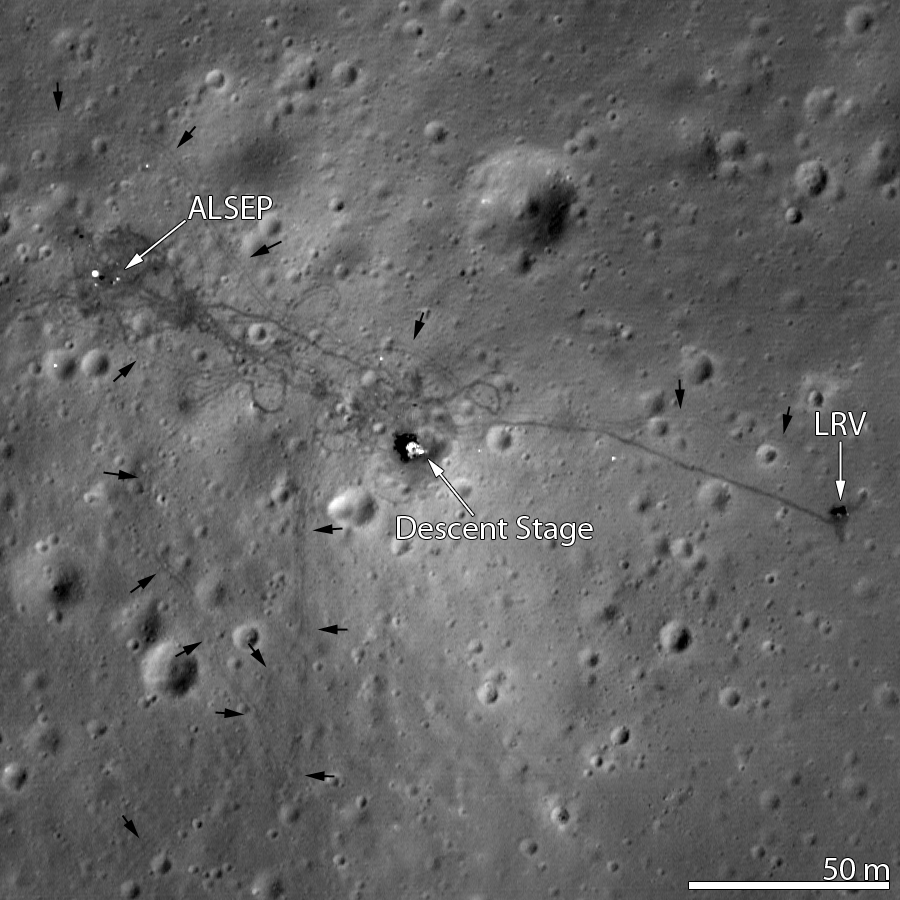
LRO image of Apollo 15 site, LRV-1 is near the right edge

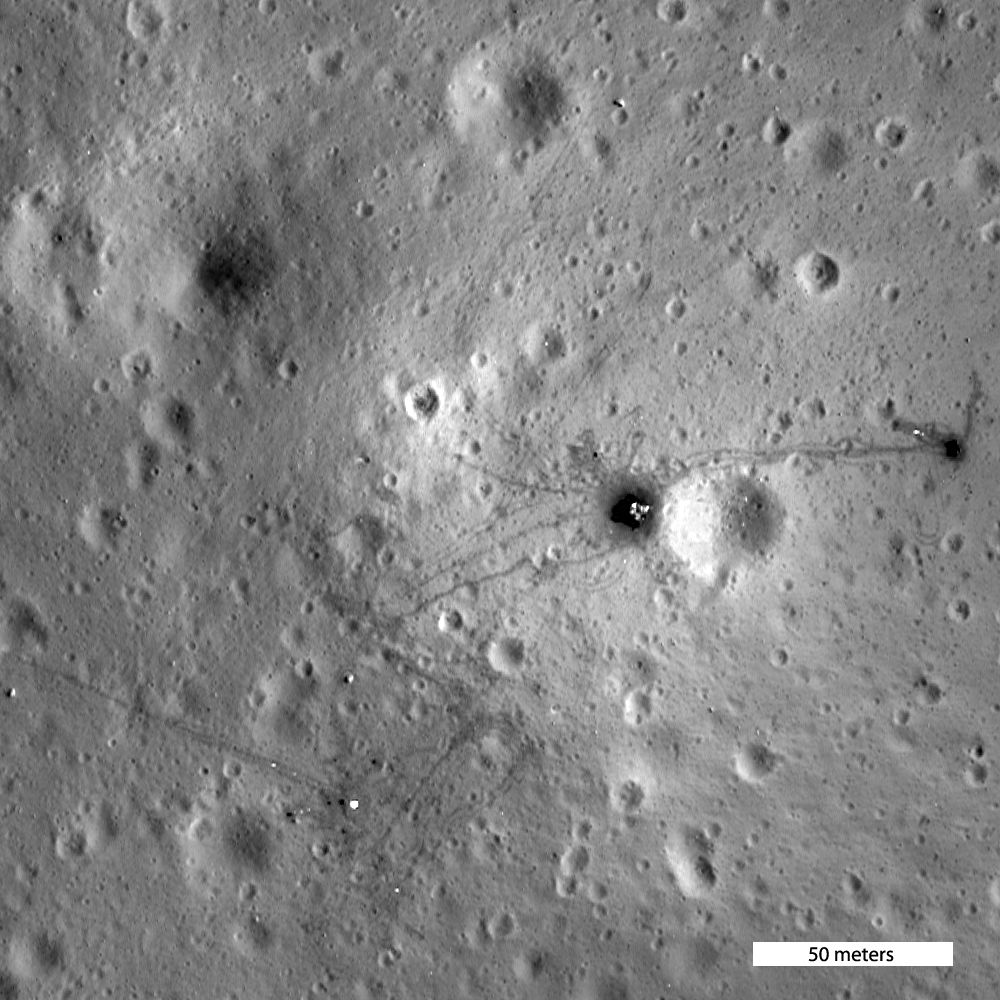
LRO image of Apollo 16 site, LRV-2 is near the right edge

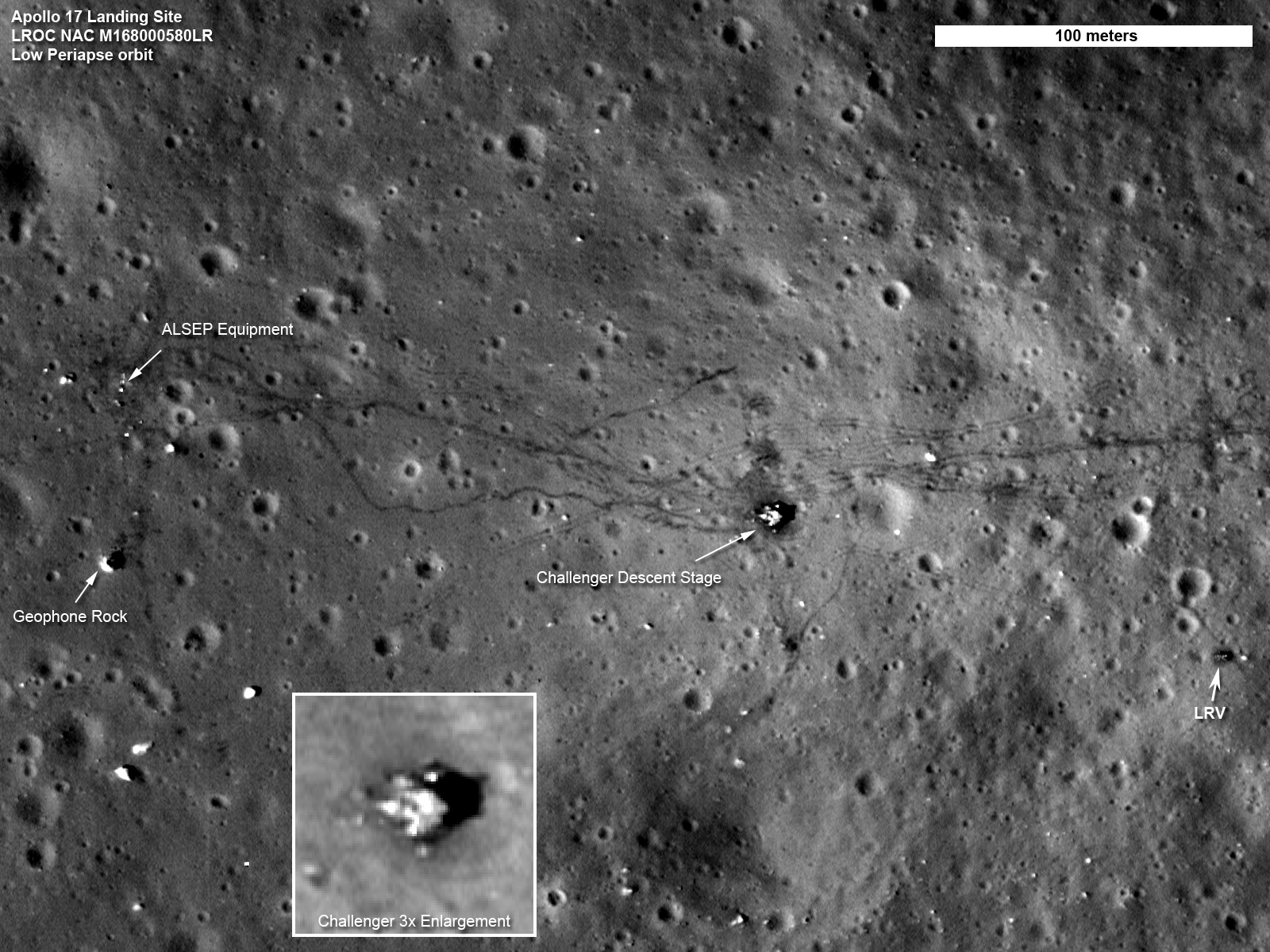
LRO image of Apollo 17 site, LRV-3 is in the lower right

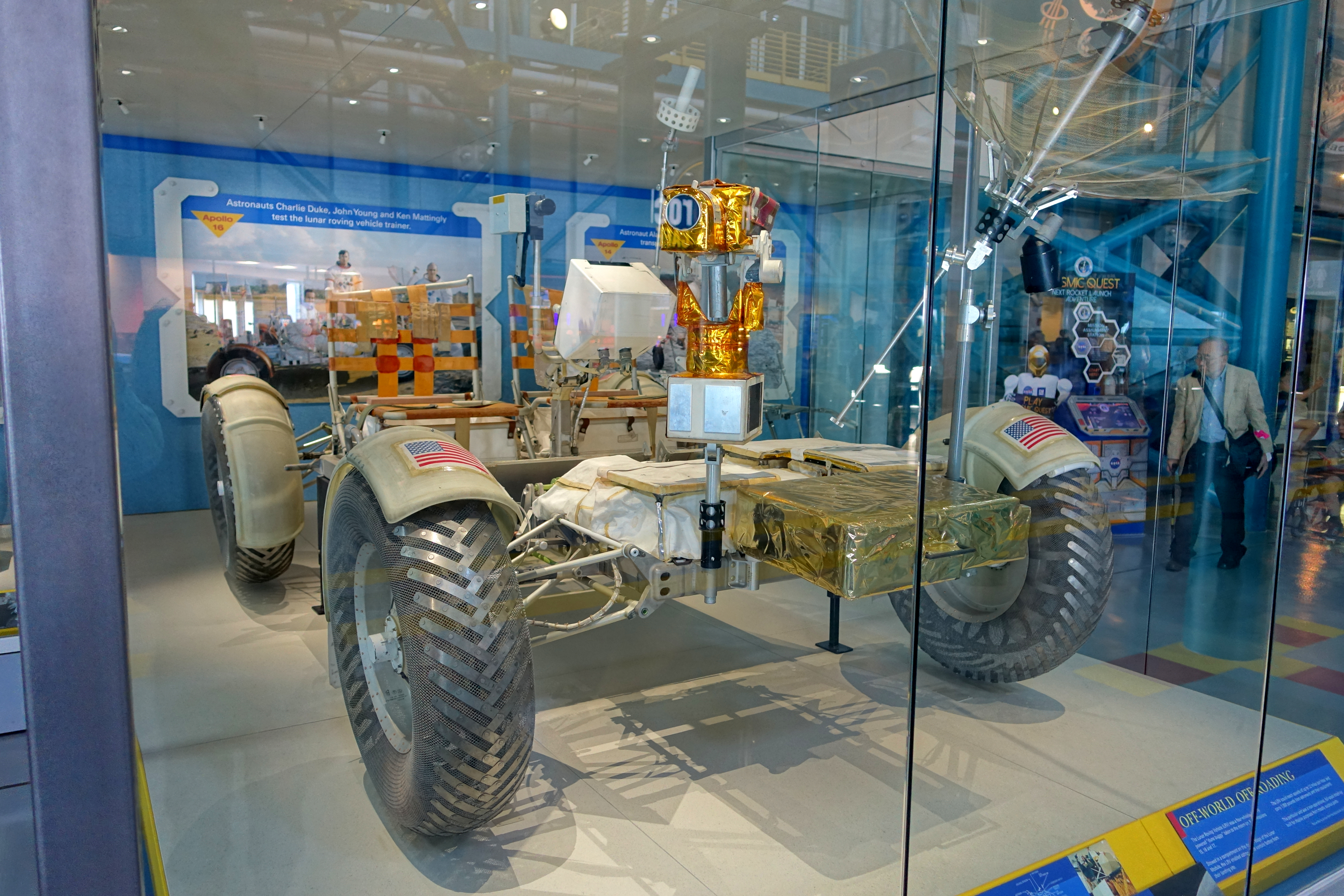
LRV-4, KSC Visitors Complex

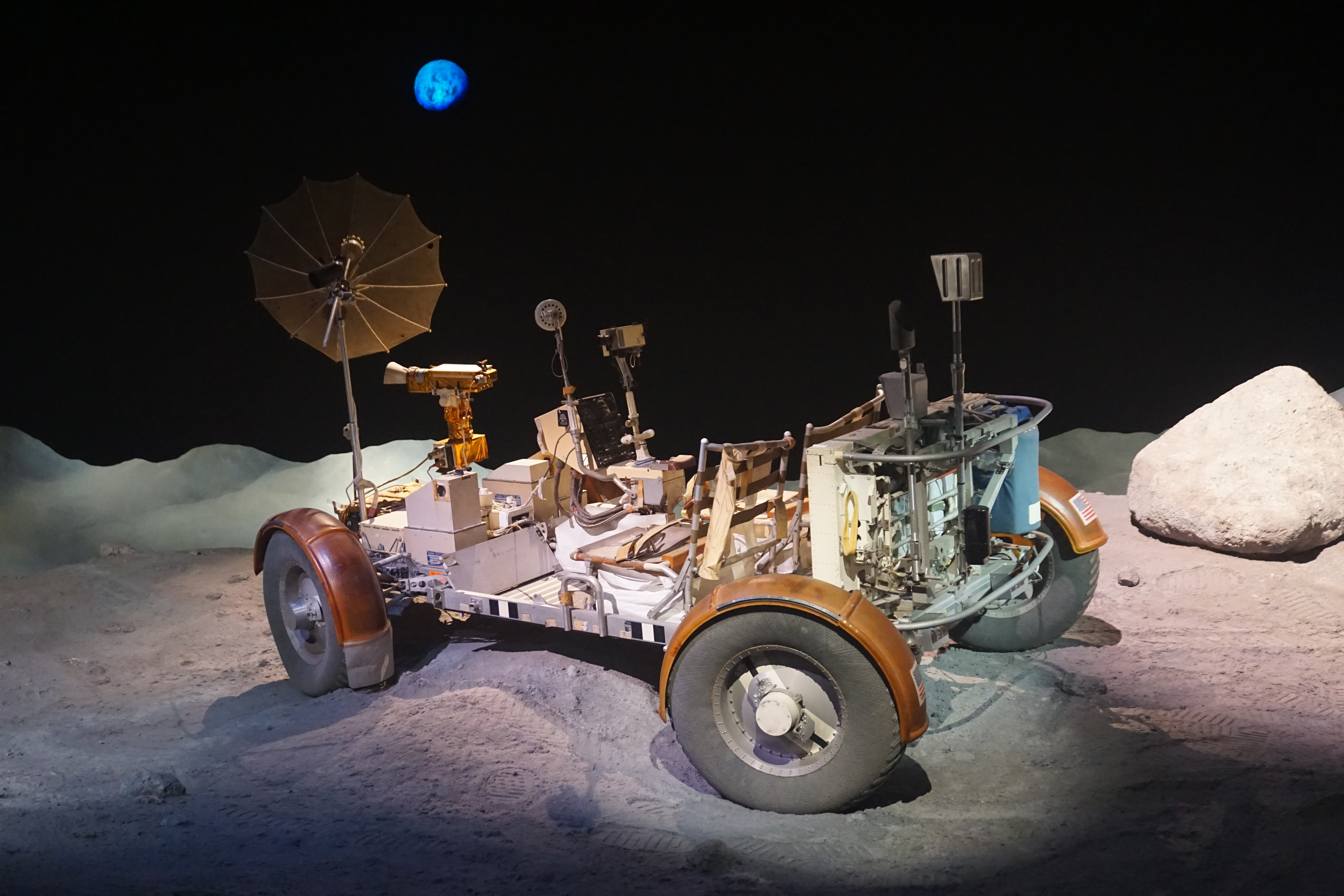
LRV 1-gravity trainer, Space Center Houston

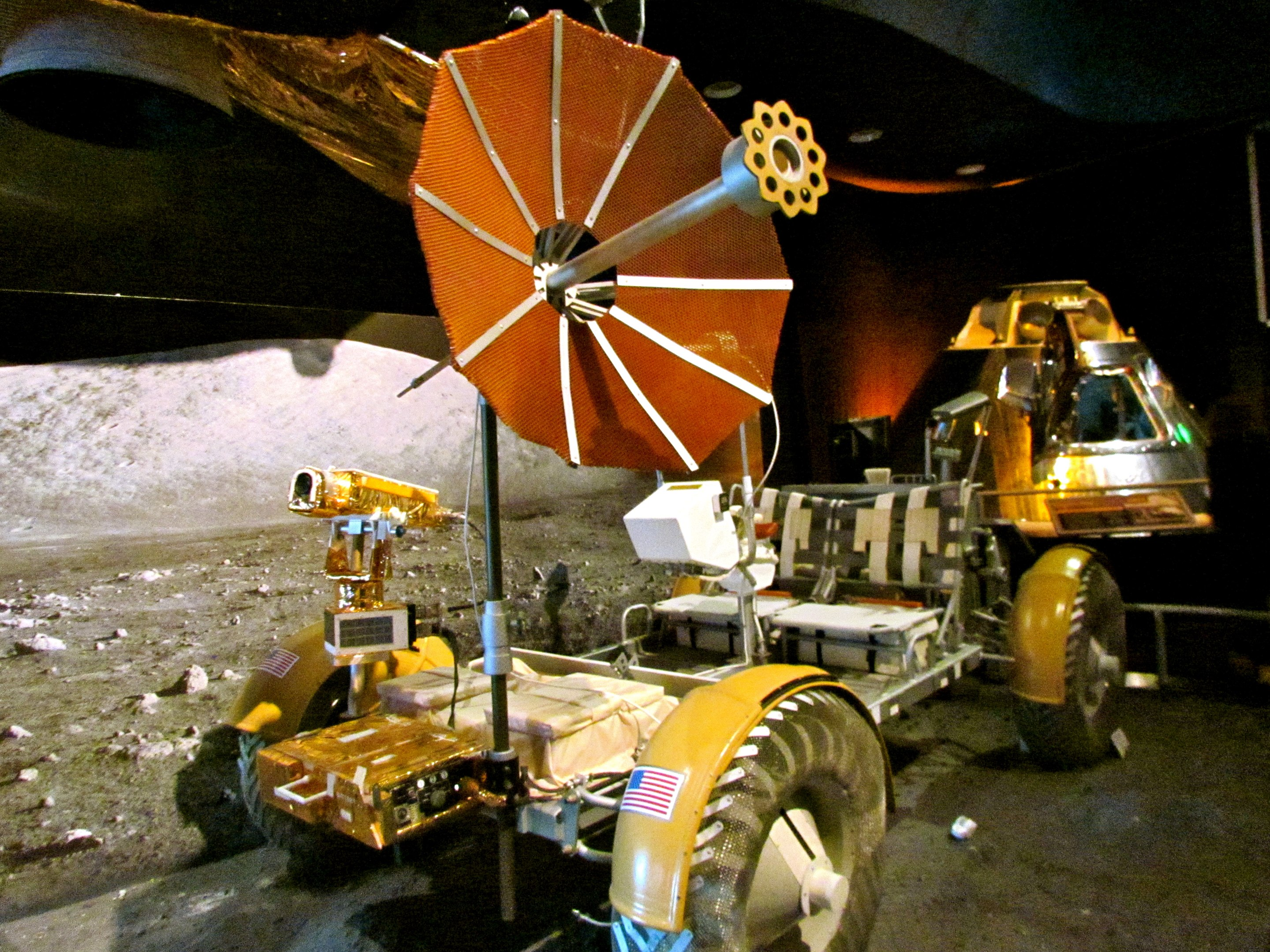
LRV engineering mockup, Museum of Flight

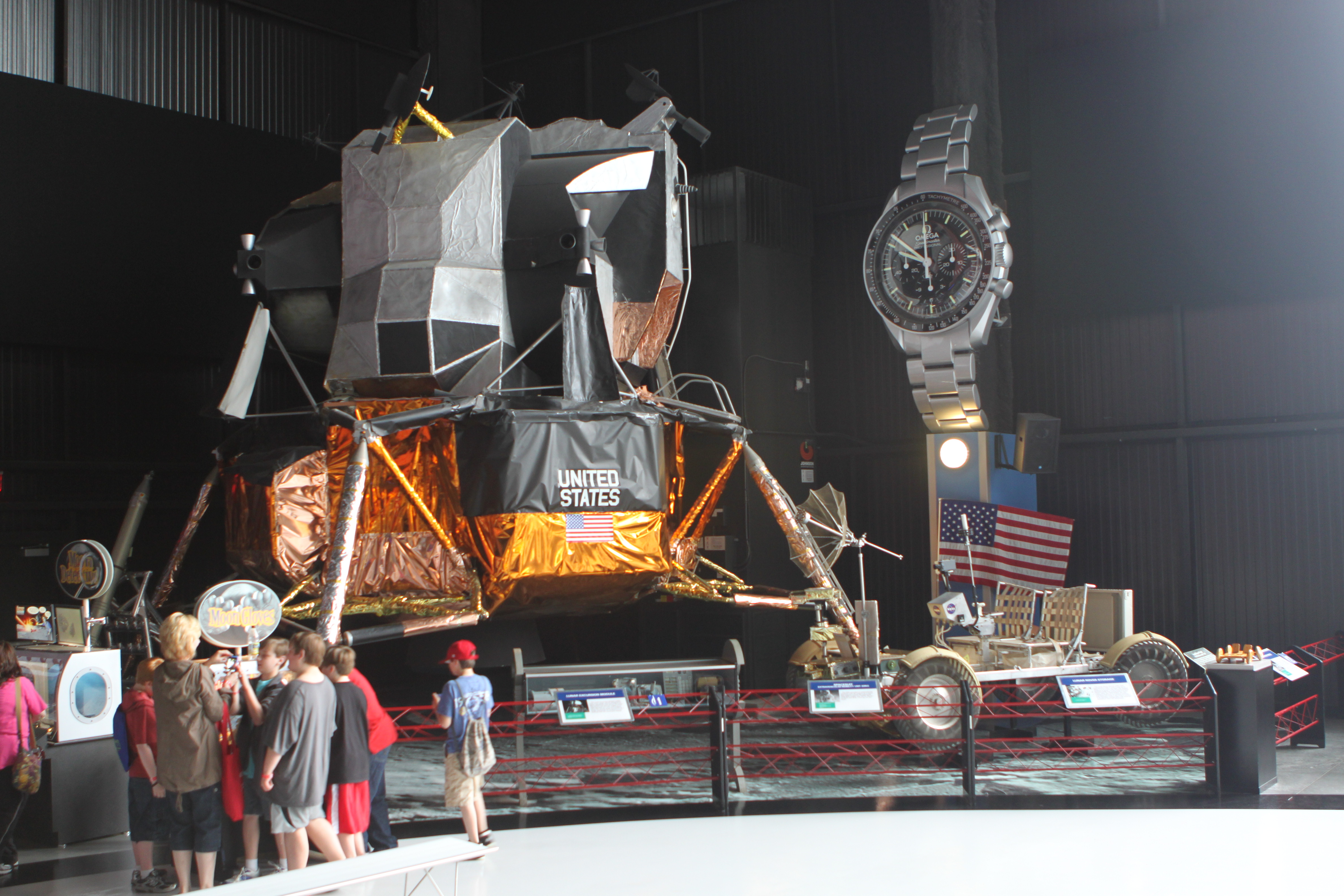
LRV Vibration Test Unit, U.S. Space & Rocket Center

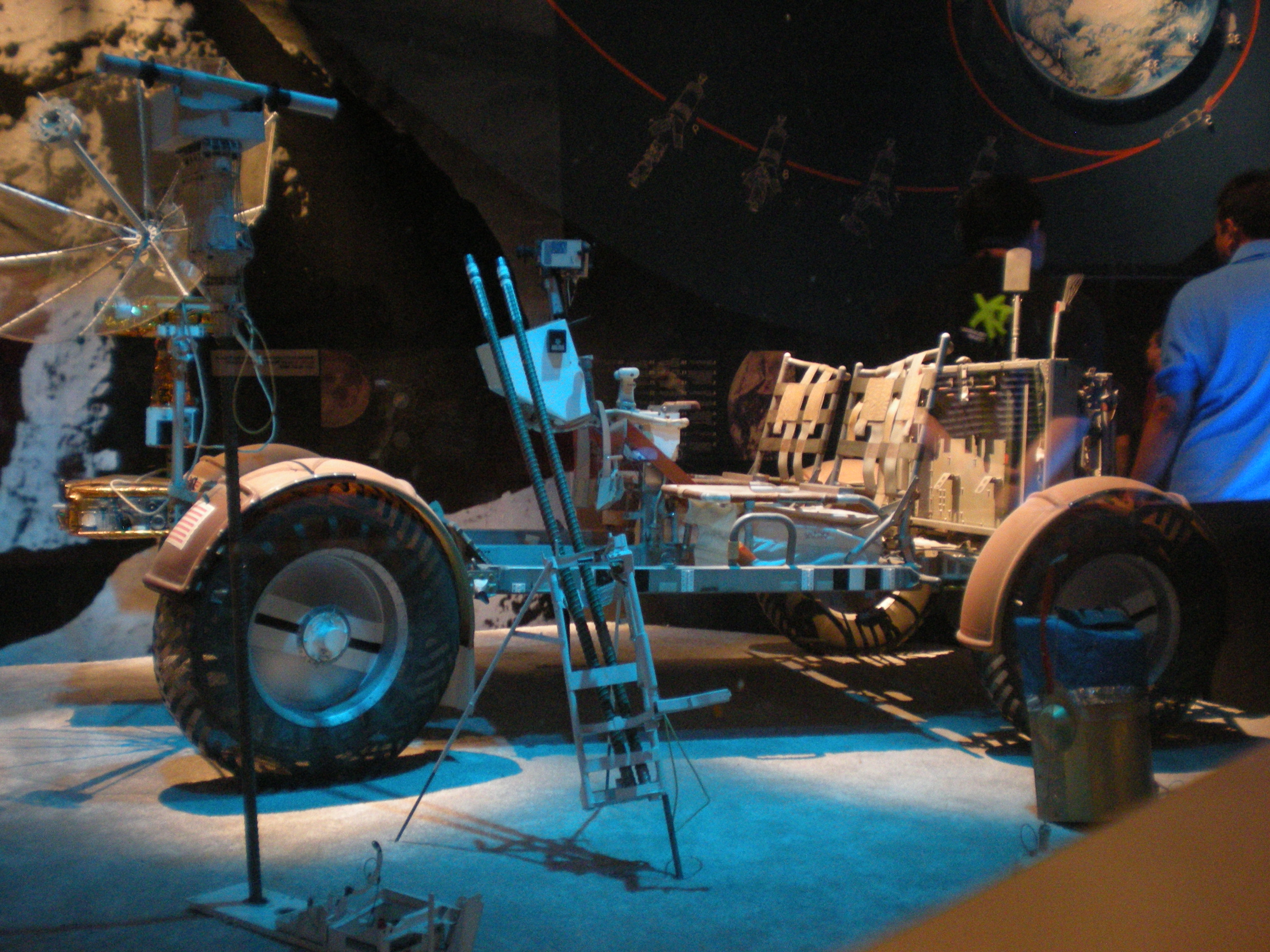
LRV Qualification Test Unit, National Air and Space Museum

Replicas of rovers are on display at the Johnson Space Center in Houston, Texas, the Kennedy Space Center Visitors Complex in Cape Canaveral, Florida, the National Museum of Naval Aviation in Pensacola, Florida, the Evergreen Aviation & Space Museum in McMinnville, Oregon, the Kansas Cosmosphere and Space Center in Hutchinson, Kansas, the Omega Museum in Biel, Switzerland and the Technik Museum Speyer in Speyer, Germany. A replica on loan from the Smithsonian Institution is on display at the Mission: Space attraction at Epcot at the Walt Disney World Resort near Orlando, Florida. In 2019, as part of the 50 year anniversary of Apollo 11, American ATV manufacturer Polaris built a fully-functional replica of the LRV using pre-existing Polaris parts and original NASA molds for the fenders; the replica, which is rechargeable and capable of driving up to 60 miles an hour, was run a NASCAR track.

== Media ==
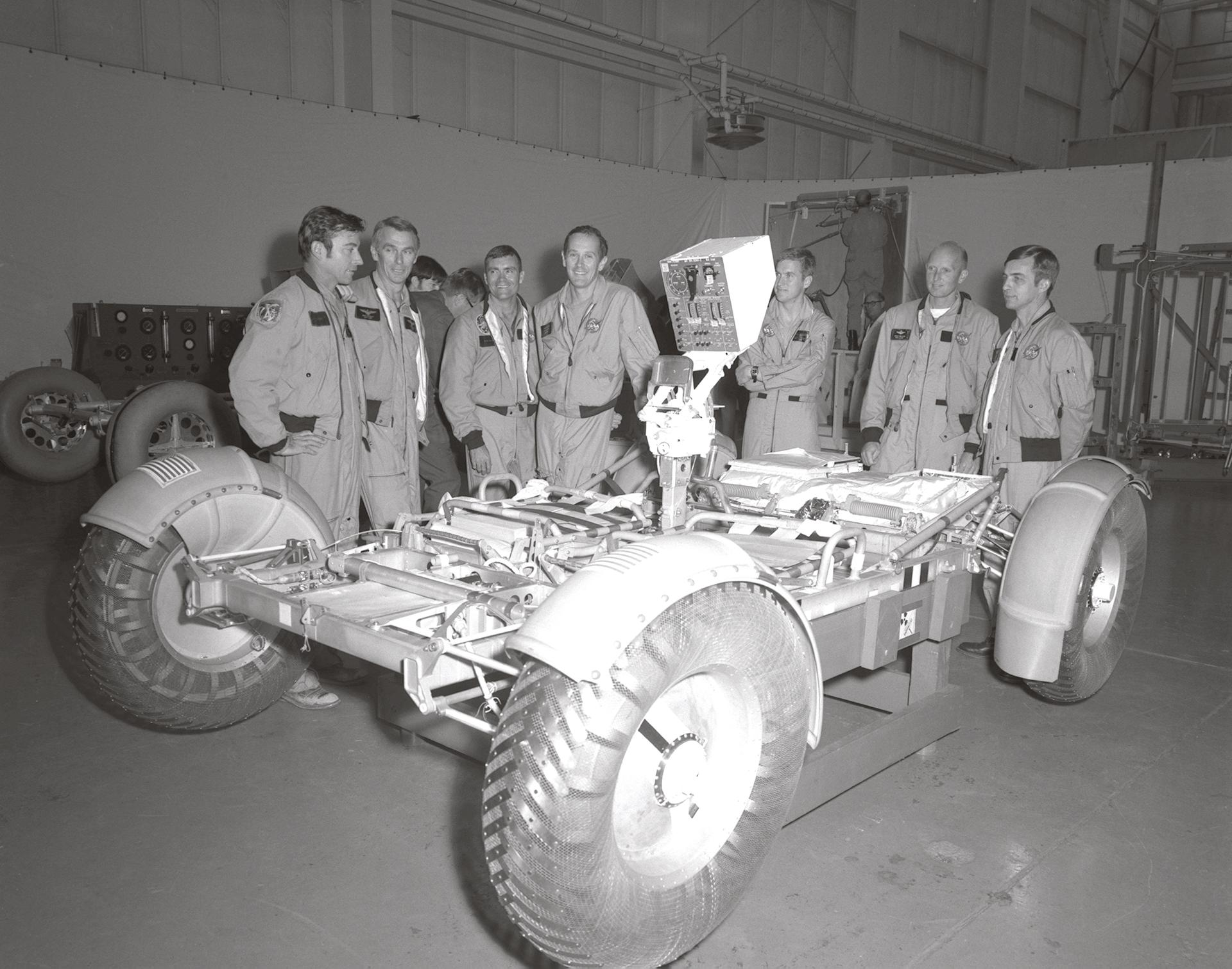
(From left to right) Astronauts John Young, Eugene Cernan, Fred Haise, Charles Duke, Anthony England, Charles Fullerton, and Donald Peterson await deployment tests of the Lunar Roving Vehicle (LRV) qualification test unit in building 4649 at the Marshall Space Flight Center (MSFC). November 1971.

Apollo 16 Commander John Young drives Lunar Rover 002

Dave Scott and Jim Irwin train on Earth to use the Lunar Rover on Apollo 15

== See also ==
- List of artificial objects on the Moon
- Lunar Terrain Vehicle
- Modular Equipment Transporter
