= Ferenc Pavlics =

Mechanical engineer (1928–2024)

Ferenc Pavlics (February 3, 1928 – February 13, 2024) was a Hungarian-born American mechanical engineer who developed the Apollo Lunar rover.

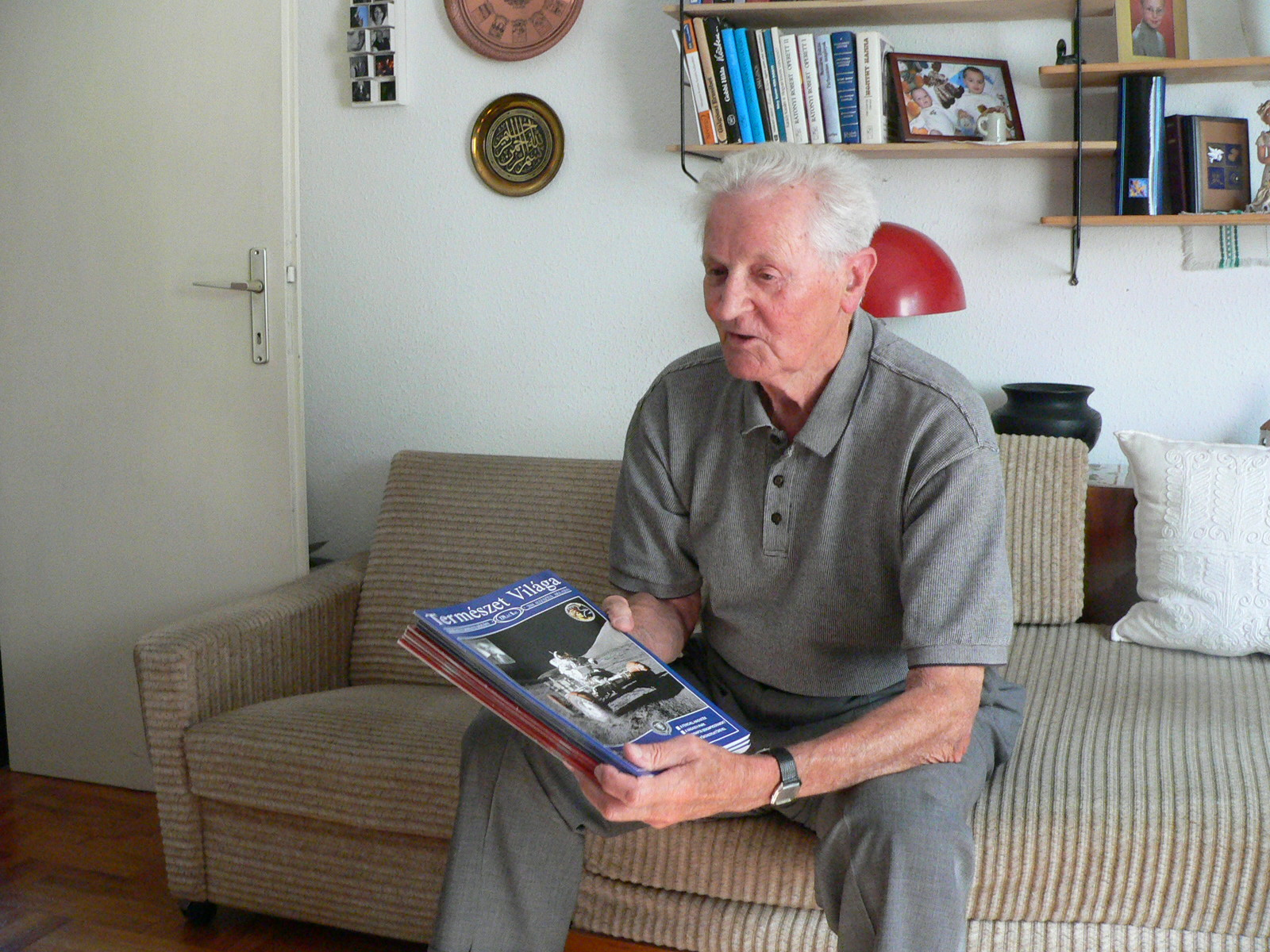
Pavlics in 2010

== Early life ==
Ferenc Pavlics was born in Balozsameggyes, Vas County, Hungary, in 1928. His father, Károly Pavlics, and mother, Rosina Perusich, were both teachers teaching in the elementary school of Balozsameggyes. At the age of six he almost died from a severe illness but recovered following an operation.

He attended the elementary school in Balozsameggyes. During the first years he was taught by his mother then his father. He attended the Faludi Ferenc high school in Szombathely and graduated in 1946. Pavlics attended the Budapest University of Technology and Economics and graduated as a mechanical engineer in 1950.

Pavlics was working in the Gépipari Tervező Intézet (Industrial Machine Planning Institute). After the Hungarian Revolution of 1956, the Pavlics family scattered around the world. Ferenc and his future wife, Klára Schwáb, went first to Austria, then to the United States. Three of his brothers and sisters also left Hungary, Anna settled in Austria, József in Sweden, and Teréz in California.

== Working on space projects ==
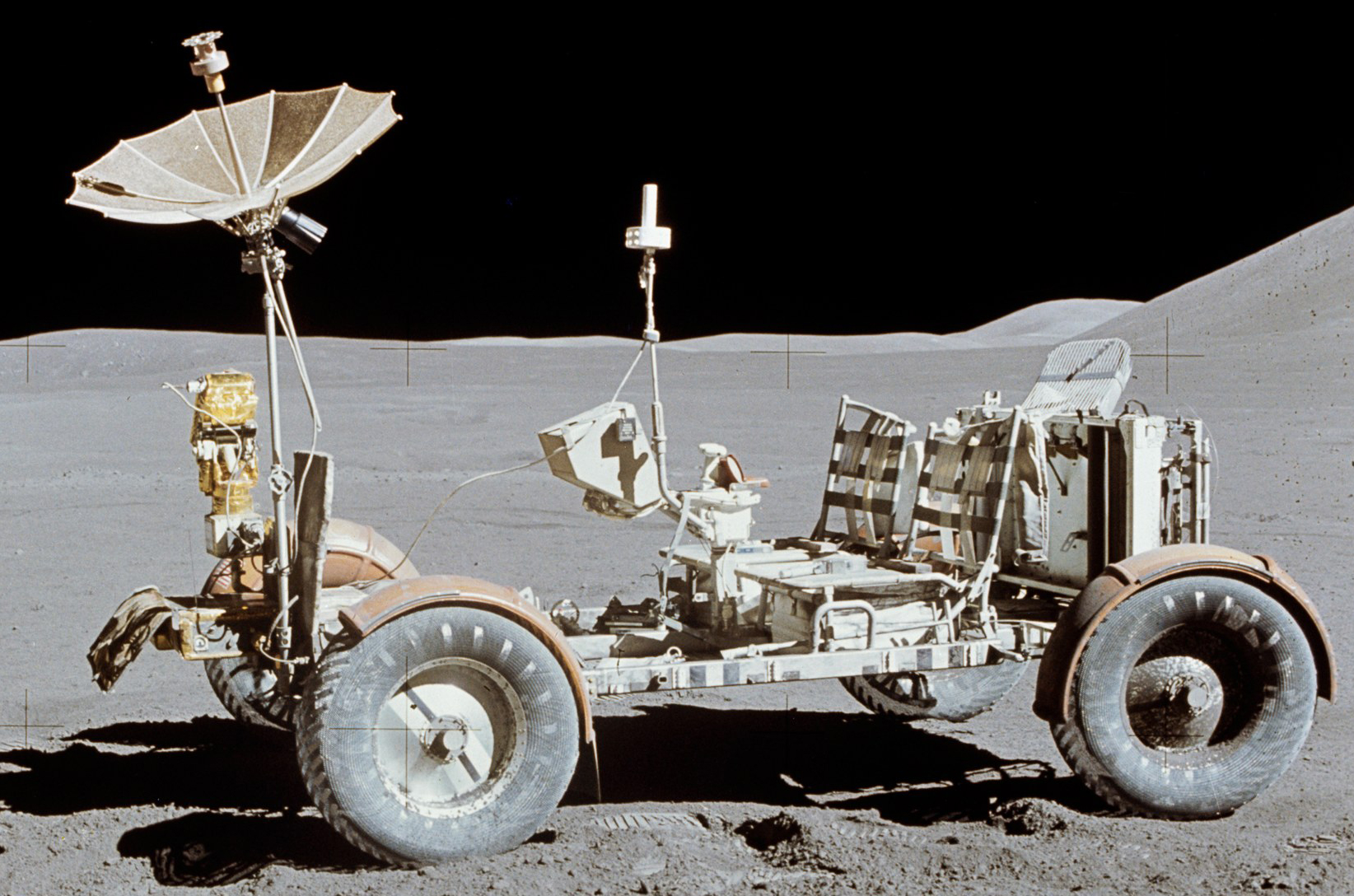
The U.S. Apollo Lunar Roving Vehicle from Apollo 15 on the Moon in 1971 (NASA)

After leaving Hungary, Pavlics first was working from 1957 in the General Motors (GM) Research Division, Detroit. From 1961 he continued his work in the Santa Barbara Division of GM developing overlands. He continued his postgraduate studies.

Later for the NASA JPL and Boeing Company he started the development of the Lunar Roving Vehicle.

The rover had a total mass of 210 kg and was designed to carry a payload of an additional 490 kg. Each wheel had a 190 W (0.25 horsepower) motor (so the full motor power of the rover was 1 HP). It had a special vehicle design to be able to move on the special surface conditions of the Moon. Their frames were made of aluminum alloy. (See more details: Lunar rover.)

In 1971, the Apollo 15 carried the first Lunar rover to the Moon. In 1972 the Apollo 16 and Apollo 17 also carried Lunar rovers. All three vehicles remained on the Moon. In 1971, Pavlics got a NASA award for the success of the Apollo program. Later, he participated in the development of hybrid and fuel cell driven vehicles and the electric bus network of Santa Barbara. Pavlics died on February 13, 2024, aged 96.

== See also ==
- List of artificial objects on the Moon
- Lunar rover
