= Sonny Morea =

American aerospace engineer and aviator (1932–2026)

Saverio Morea
- Born: January 23, 1932; New York City, U.S.
- Died: July 6, 2026 (aged 94); Huntsville, Alabama, U.S.
- Education: City College of New York (diploma); University of Oklahoma (MA)
- Known for: F-1 engine program manager, J-2 engine program manager, Lunar Roving Vehicle program manager
- Spouse: Angela Fiore (m. 1954)
- Children: 4
- Awards: NASA Exceptional Service Medal (twice)

Saverio "Sonny" Morea (January 23, 1932 – July 6, 2026) was an American aerospace engineer, NASA employee and flight instructor. He managed the development of the F-1 and J-2 engines as well as the Lunar Roving Vehicle.

== Early life ==
Morea was born and raised in Queens in what he has referred to as "very humble beginnings." He attended Brooklyn Technical High School, where he graduated in 1950 having completed the Aeronautical Engineering curriculum. While in high school, he worked every other weekend with his father for 13 dollars a day. He spent the money on flight lessons, earning his pilot's license by the time of his graduation.

After high school, Morea attended the City College of New York, where he graduated with an engineering degree. He was also involved with the college's Army Reserve Officers' Training Corps (ROTC) program, through which he was commissioned as a second lieutenant. His first professional job was with North American Aviation in the Aerophysics Department. Morea worked on the SM-64 Navaho at North American, specifically in designing the rocket's wind tunnel aft body.

== Career ==
=== U.S. Army and civilian career ===
In 1955, Morea was called to active duty. He was reassigned to the Ordnance Corps, training for several weeks at the Aberdeen Proving Ground before being ordered to report to Redstone Arsenal in Huntsville, Alabama. "I didn't even know where that was when I got the letter," Morea recounted. "I was confused. I had no idea what was going on down there and didn't know why they had picked me." At Redstone Arsenal, Morea worked under Dr. Wernher von Braun on the guidance and control systems of the PGM-11 Redstone ballistic missile. Morea's work involved servo mechanisms, which were not his area of expertise, and he considered his experience "more of a project management involvement rather than an engineering involvement." During this time he was promoted to first lieutenant by General John B. Medaris.

Morea's time in the ROTC ended in 1957, but he continued to live and work in Huntsville. Following the Redstone missile project, he moved to his engineering field of choice, rocket propulsion. He worked on the S-3D engine, used on the PGM-19 Jupiter and PGM-17 Thor ballistic missiles, and later its successor the H-1 engine, used on the Saturn I and Saturn IB rockets.

=== MSFC career ===
In July 1960, Morea and the rest of the "von Braun rocket team" transferred to NASA to join the newly created Marshall Space Flight Center. Morea was assigned as project manager of the F-1 engine program, overseeing a $1 billion budget. Morea called combustion instability, a major issue in the development of the F-1, "the biggest problem I ever had in my entire career." After the success of the F-1, he was made manager of the J-2 engine project following failures during a test flight. Under his oversight, the J-2 reached successful completion for crewed flights. From his success in managing the two engine projects, Wernher von Braun selected Morea as the project manager of the Lunar Roving Vehicle to be used in the Apollo program. The conditions for completing the project were strict: understanding of lunar travel conditions was limited at the time, and after signing a contractor, Morea's team had only 17 and a half months to design, build, and ship the final product. Despite budgetary issues three months into the project, the LRV was successfully completed and utilized in the Apollo 15, 16, and 17 missions. Morea retired from NASA in November 1990.

Morea received the NASA Exceptional Service Medal twice, once each for managing the F-1 and LRV projects respectively. On August 27, 2016, he was inducted into the Alabama Aviation Hall of Fame.

== Personal life and death ==
Morea married Angela Fiore in 1954. The two had four children, named Gail, Lorraine, Domenic, and Patricia.

He received his private pilot licence in 1949 while a high school junior. He later received a commercial pilot licence, an instrument rating, a flight instructor rating, and a multiengine rating. Morea has achieved over 7,000 flight hours, 3,600 of which were spent as a flight instructor to more than 100 students.

Morea died on July 6, 2026, at the age of 94.
