= Motor-CAD =

CAD software package for electric motors and generators

Motor-CAD Ltd.
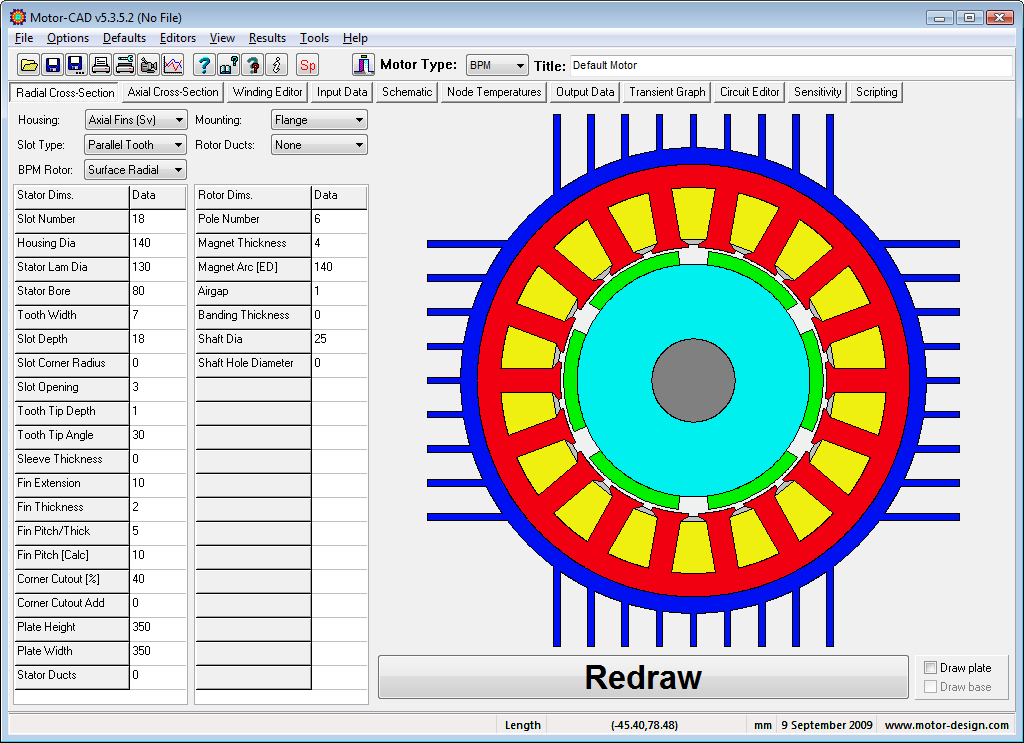
- Motor-CAD 2009.
- Developer(s): Motor Design Ltd
- Initial release: November 1999
- Stable release: 10.4.1 / May 2017
- Operating system: Windows
- Type: CAD
- License: Proprietary
- Website: motor-design.com

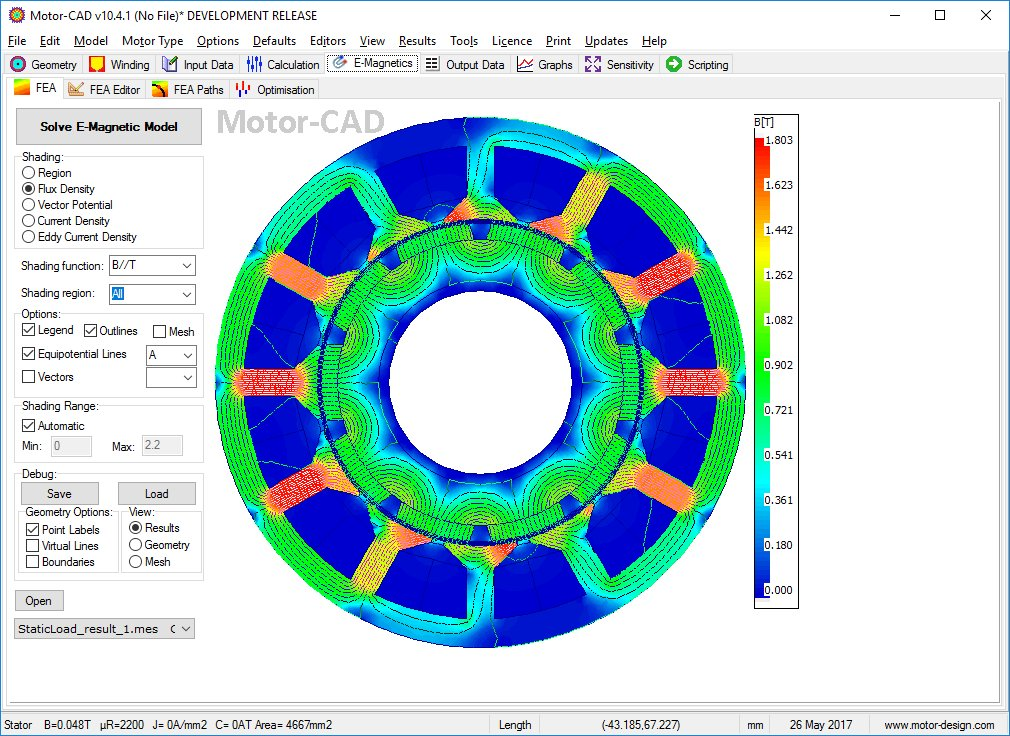
Motor-CAD electromagnetic results

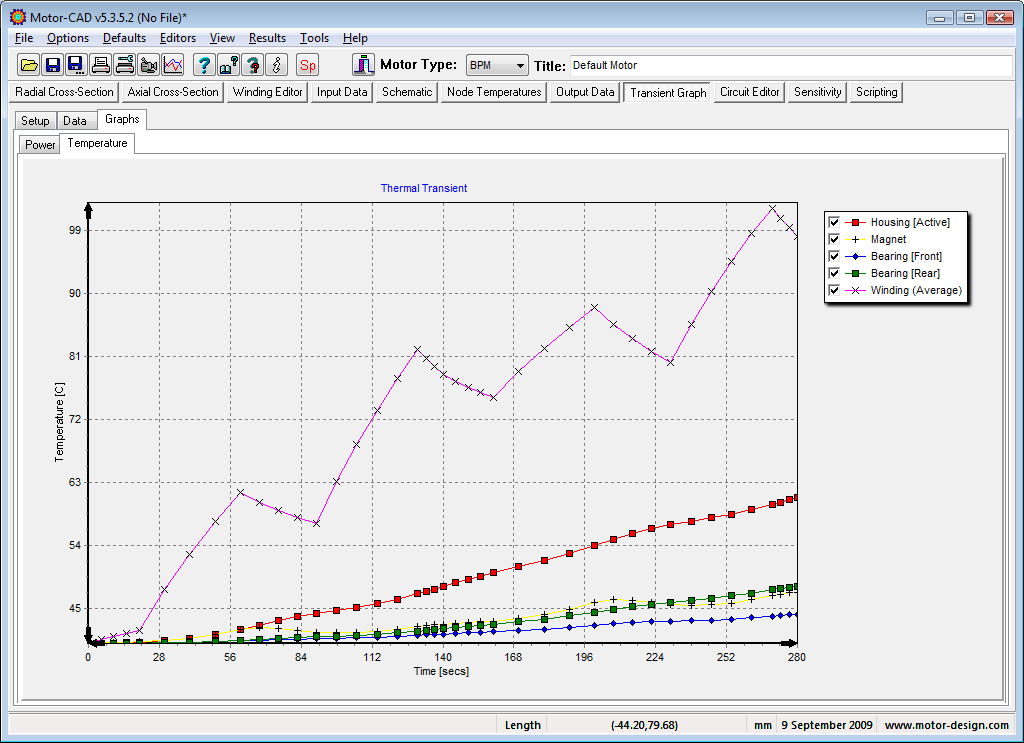
Motor-CAD transient thermal results

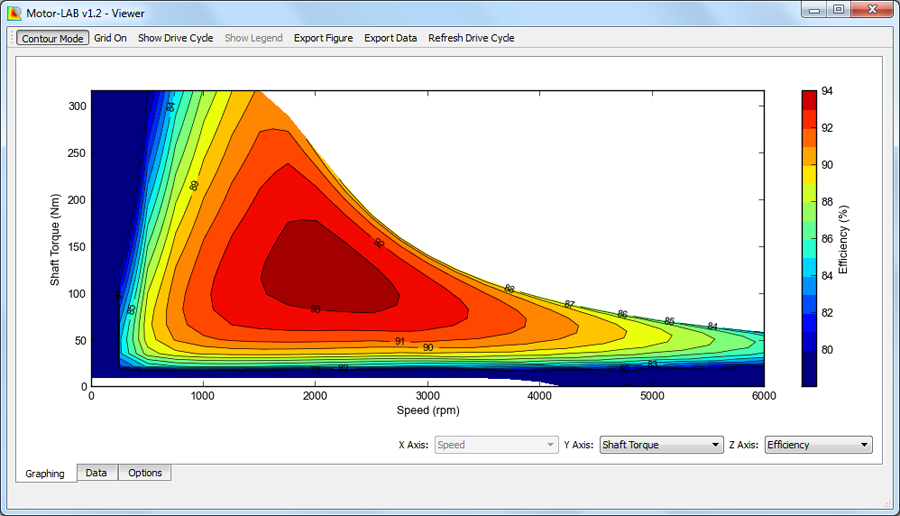
Motor-CAD Lab efficiency map

Motor-CAD is an Electromagnetic and Thermal analysis package for electric motors and generators, developed and sold by Motor Design Ltd. It was initially released in 1999.

Modules are available for brushless permanent magnet motors (BPM), outer rotor BPM motors, induction motors, permanent magnet dc machines, switched reluctance motors, synchronous machines and claw pole machines.

An integrated ultra fast finite element module (EMag) provides accurate electromagnetic and electrical performance predictions.

The thermal module (Therm) combines lumped circuit and finite element thermal calculations for optimising the cooling system of the machine. Cooling methods modelled include natural convection (Totally enclosed non ventilated - TENV), forced convection (Totally enclosed fan cooled - TEFC), through ventilation, water jackets, submersible, wet rotor and wet stator, spray cooling, radiation and conduction. A wide range of housing types can be modelled.

The Lab module works with the EMag and Therm modules to help develop new design concepts. It provides efficiency mapping and duty cycle / drive cycle transient outputs within a few minutes.

Thermal analysis of electric machines is regarded as a more challenging area of analysis than electromagnetic analysis in the construction of the model and the accuracy achievable.

Thermal analysis of electrical machines is becoming ever more important due to the increasing drive for energy efficiency and compact design machines. This is particularly true for the aerospace and automotive sectors where size, weight and efficiency are driving the design of machines. The design approach often taken is to consider both electromagnetic and thermal aspects of a machines design at the early stages in machine design, where Motor-CAD allows this to be done.

Other possible thermal modelling techniques include computational fluid dynamics. Motor-CAD has been shown to give results with a similar accuracy in a fraction of the time.
