= Singly fed electric machine =

Ordinary electric motor or generator

Singly fed electric machine is a broad term which covers ordinary electric motors and electric generators. Such machines have only one external connection to the windings, and thus are said to be singly fed.

== See also ==
- Doubly fed electric machine
- Rotary converter
