= Turbine (disambiguation) =

A turbine is a rotary mechanical device that extracts energy from a fluid flow.

Turbine may also refer to:

== In software ==
- Turbine, Inc., a software company
- Apache Turbine, a rapid development web application framework

== Ships ==
- Turbine-class destroyer, a class of Italian warships mainly used during World War II
- Italian destroyer Turbine, a World War I destroyer of the Nembo class

== Other uses ==
- TURBINE (US government project)
- Turbine, Ontario
- 1. FFC Turbine Potsdam, a women's football team in Potsdam, Germany
- Mohamed Tabarsi, a character nicknamed Turbine in the Japanese Shaman King manga series
- Turbine interchange, a road interchange between two freeways
- Sunday Tribune, a defunct Irish newspaper, informally called the Turbine
- Turbine (album), a 1994 album by The Walk
- Turbines (album), a 2013 album by Tunng
- A former roller coaster at Walibi Belgium
