= Turb =

Turb or TURB may refer to:

- Turbulence
- Trade Union Research Bureau

== See also ==
- Turbo (disambiguation)
