= Turbine engine =

A turbine engine is a machine using a turbine and may refer to:

- Steam turbine, where the turbine is driven by steam
- Gas turbine. where the turbine is driven by internally combusted gases
  - Jet turbine, a jet engine
    - Turbojet

== See also ==
- Turbine generator, a generator powered by turbine
- Turbo (disambiguation)
- Turbine (disambiguation)
- Engine (disambiguation)
- Motor (disambiguation)
