= Test Stand 4670 =

Rocket engine test facility

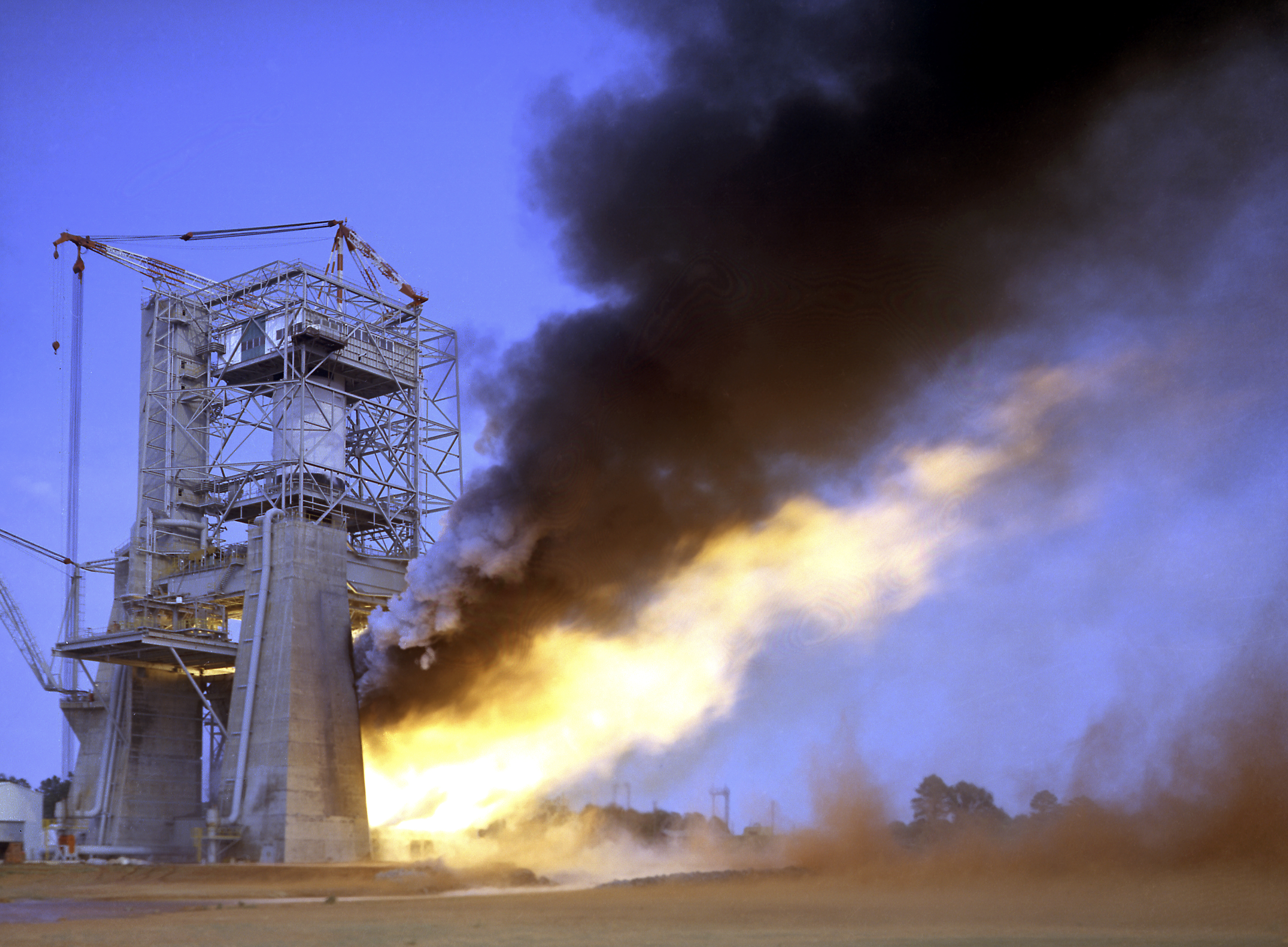
Saturn V first stage (S-IC) test firing at Marshall Spaceflight Center's Test Stand 4670.

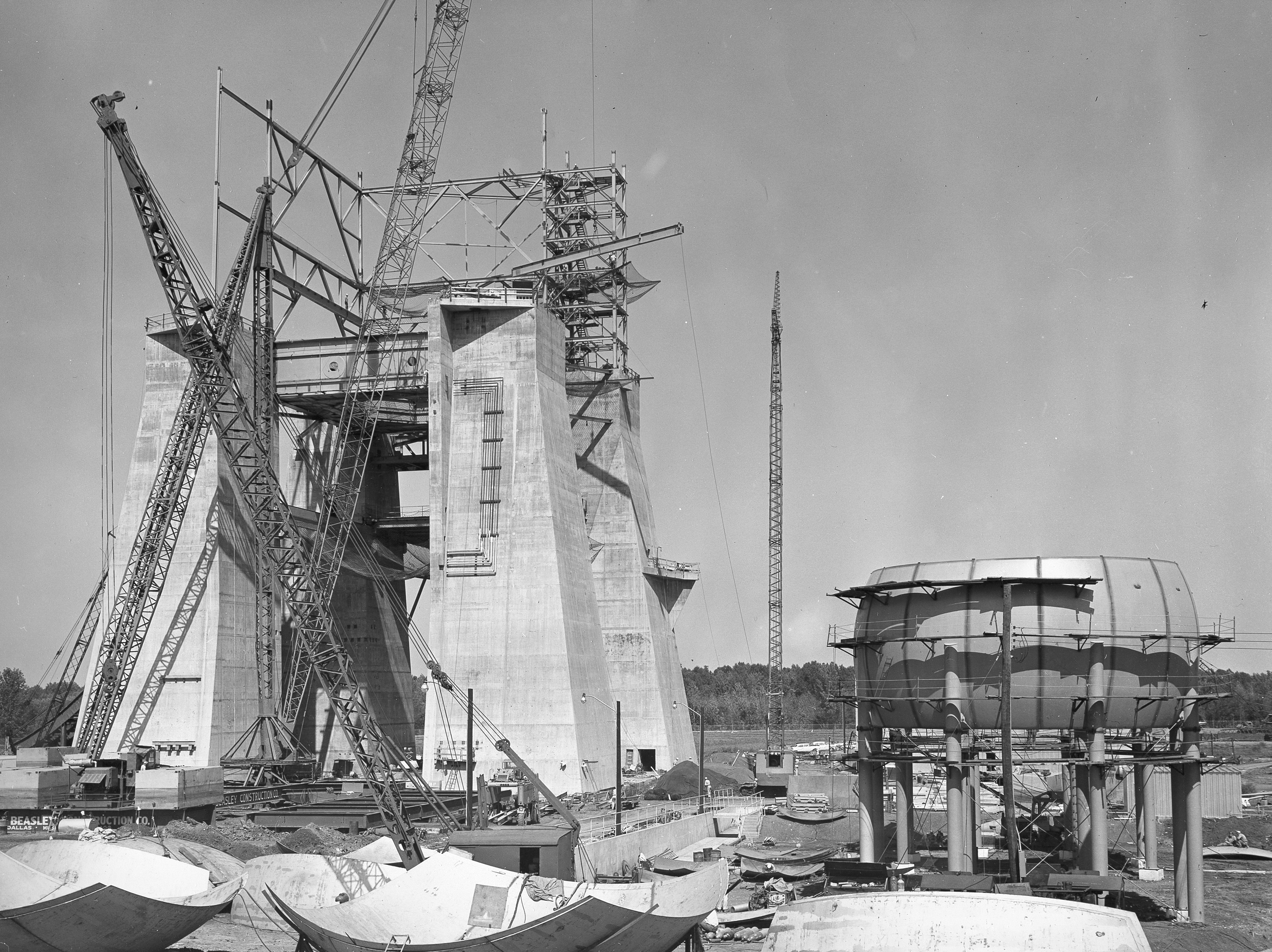
Test Stand 4670's steel structure is being assembled atop its four massive concrete legs.

The S-IC Stage Static Facility, also known as Test Stand 4670 and the Advanced Engine Test Facility, at the George C. Marshall Spaceflight Center (MSFC) in Huntsville, Alabama is an active test stand originally designed to test the Saturn V first stage booster. Originally conceived by Wernher von Braun, the first director of MSFC, the center's Test Laboratory oversaw the design and construction of the site. This test stand was necessary for NASA's push to send astronauts to the Moon before the Soviet Union.

The stand went through numerous stages of use through the Apollo, shuttle and now commercial-focused NASA space eras. Its only comparable counterpart in the United States is the John C. Stennis Space Center's B-1/B-2 test stands in Mississippi.

== Construction ==
The $30 million dollar structure's major construction contract was awarded to San Francisco based Ets, Hokin, and Galvan, Inc. In late July 1963, the four massive pillars defining the structures silhouette were completed. Full construction and integration was completed in 1965.

=== Specifications ===
- Maximum test thrust: 12 million pounds
- Liquid hydrogen storage: 450,000 gallons off stand; 75,000 gallons on stand
- Liquid oxygen storage: 23,000 gallons on stand
- Gas capability: hydrogen, nitrogen, helium, air
- RP-1 storage: 150,000 gallons (shared with F-1 engine test stand)
- Water deflector capacity: 273,000 gal/min @ 185 psig
- Instrumentation: 750 digital channels; 108 analog channels

The foundation is set into the bedrock 40 feet (12.2 m) underground. Each of the four hollow concrete leg is 144 feet tall (43.9 m). Those hollow legs contain rooms with a shop and instrumentation facility. The widest section of the structure's base is 47 square feet (4.37 square meters). The entire structure stretches to 266 feet (81.1 m) tall. Placed on top of the steel superstructure is a 135-foot-long crane capable of lifting 200 tons (181,400 kg). When fully vertical, the crane makes the entire structure 400 feet (121.9 m) tall.

The flame deflector is a 1,900 ton (1,720,000 kg) steel construction capable of diverting the full 7.5 million pounds of thrust coming from the Saturn V first stage. It was constructed outside of the site, wheeled into place and set beneath the test site's main platform. Its one-inch steel plate construction has 387,000 5/32-inch (0.4 cm) holes to enable the 273,000 gallon-per-minute flowrate of water. During tests, 13 diesel generators producing 2577 horsepower (1922 kW) each flow water from two 3.5 million gallon storage tanks.

== Apollo era ==
March 1, 1965 denotes the first fit up of a Saturn V first stage booster, S-IC-T, ahead of a static-fire campaign to validate the Saturn V rocket. On April 10 of 1965, a 16.73 second single-engine fire of S-IC-T was conducted. April 16 marked the first static fire of an entire first stage, firing for 6.5 seconds and generating 7.5 million pounds of thrust thanks to its five F-1 engines. On August 5, the first full-duration burn test occurred, for a full burn time of two-and-a-half minutes.

== Space Shuttle era ==
Starting in 1974, alterations to the test stand were made to accommodate Space Shuttle component testing. A system to enable the pressurization of the Space Shuttle external tank with liquid and gaseous hydrogen to 3,100 psig. These tests were concluded in 1980. In 1986, more modifications were made to the stand to enable testing of the Technology Test Bed engine, a derivative of the Space Shuttle Main Engine (SSME). At this time, the stand was renamed to the Advanced Engine Test Facility.

== Blue Origin era ==
In 2019, Blue Origin signed an agreement with NASA granting the company use of the test stand for vertical BE-4 and BE-3U testing, reviving its operation since its inactivity in 1998. It was posted in 2017 as available for use after being rendered underutilized. The terms of the Commercial Space Launch Act Agreement disclose that Blue Origin covered the costs for refurbishing the facility, as well as any expenses for its operation. Much of that expense was corroded structural-steel beams that required evaluation and often replacement, as well as general modernization of the 60s-born structure. This facility is likely focused on testing the BE-4 variants that Blue Origin sells to United Launch Alliance (ULA) for use on the Vulcan rocket, due to its proximity to ULA's production facility. Under Blue Origin, Test Stand 4670 is capable of testing two engines from the stand's two test positions. Those capabilities are as follows:

TF 4670 Position 1

- Propellants: LH2, LOX, RP-1, GH2 & GHe
- Maximum Thrust – 750,000 pounds

TF 4670 Position 2

- Propellants: LH2, LOX, RP-1, GH2 & GHe
- Maximum Thrust – 1,000,000 pounds

== See also ==
- George C. Marshall Spaceflight Center
- S-IC-T
- Blue Origin Facilities
