= S-IC-T =

American super heavy-lift expendable rocket first stage of Saturn V, test unit

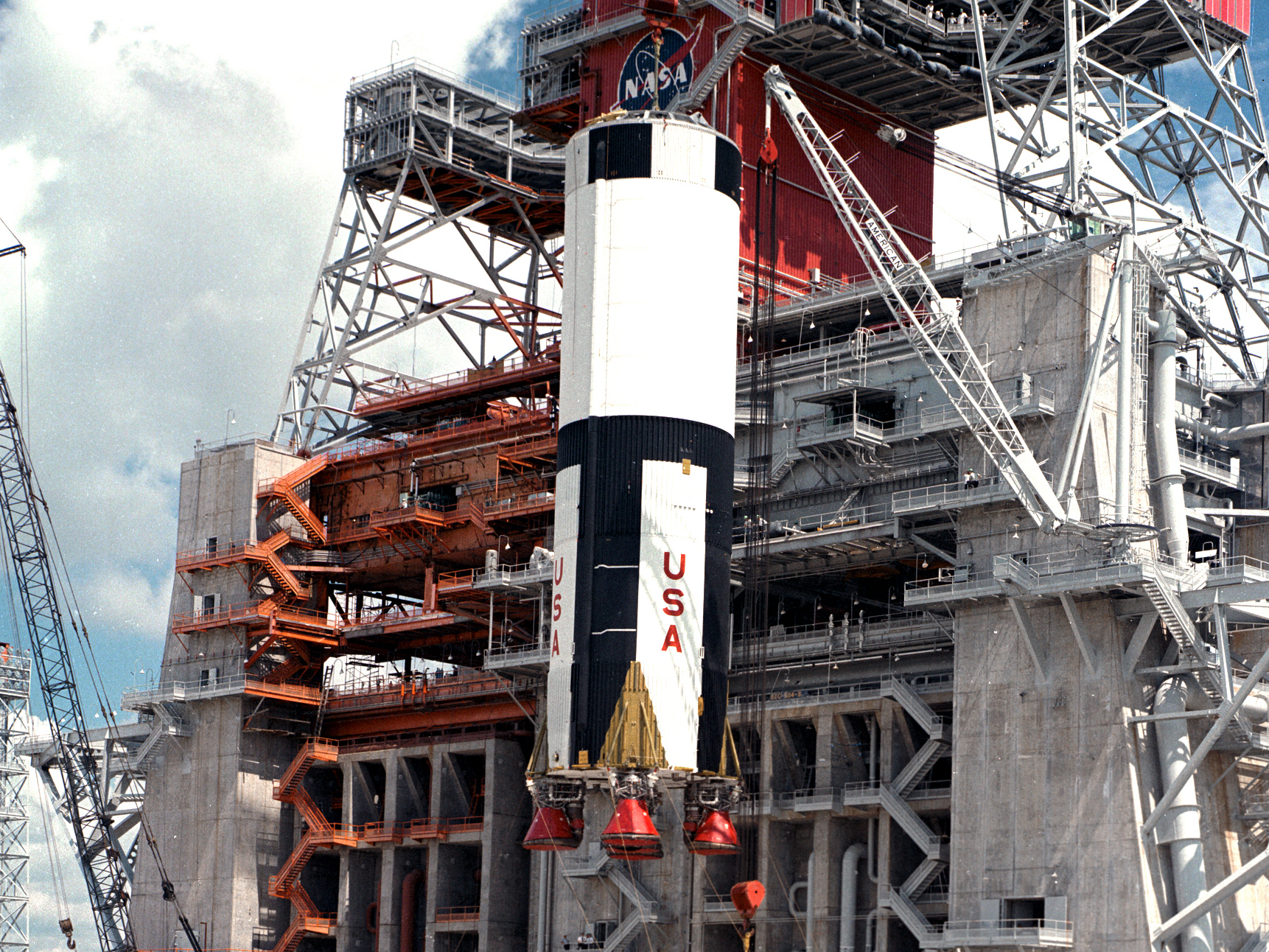
- S-IC-T being lifted into the B-2 Test Stand
- Manufacturer: Boeing for NASA at Marshall Space Flight Center
- Country of origin: United States
- Used on: Static testing of the S-IC stage, used on the Saturn V rocket program

General characteristics
- Height: 42 m (138 ft)
- Diameter: 10 m (33 ft)
- Gross mass: 5,030,000 lb (2,280,000 kg)
- Propellant mass: 4,400,000 lb (2,000,000 kg)
- Empty mass: 290,000 lb (130,000 kg)

Launch history
- Status: Display at Kennedy Space Center's Apollo-Saturn V Center museum
- Total launches: None, static test stage at NASA Mississippi Test Facility, now known as Stennis Space Center
- Successes (stage only): 18 test fires from 1965 to 1967

Engine details
- Powered by: 5 × F-1
- Maximum thrust: 34,500 kN (7,750,000 lbf)
- Specific impulse: 263 s (2.58 km/s)
- Burn time: 150 seconds
- Propellant: LOX / RP-1

S-IC-T is a non-flight test article of the S-IC first stage of the Saturn V super-heavy lift launch vehicle system. S-IC-T was built by Boeing Company, under contract from National Aeronautics and Space Administration, to be a static test rocket. The main role of the S-IC-T was the integrated testing of the five liquid fuel rocket engines to be used in the Apollo program. S-IC-T was assembled at the Marshall Space Flight Center (MSFC) in Huntsville, Alabama, where it underwent its initial static fire testing on April 10, 1965. S-IC-T was then test fired at the NASA Mississippi Test Facility, now known as Stennis Space Center. S-IC-T was given the nickname T-Bird (Test Bird). S-IC-T is now on display at Kennedy Space Center in Florida.

== History ==
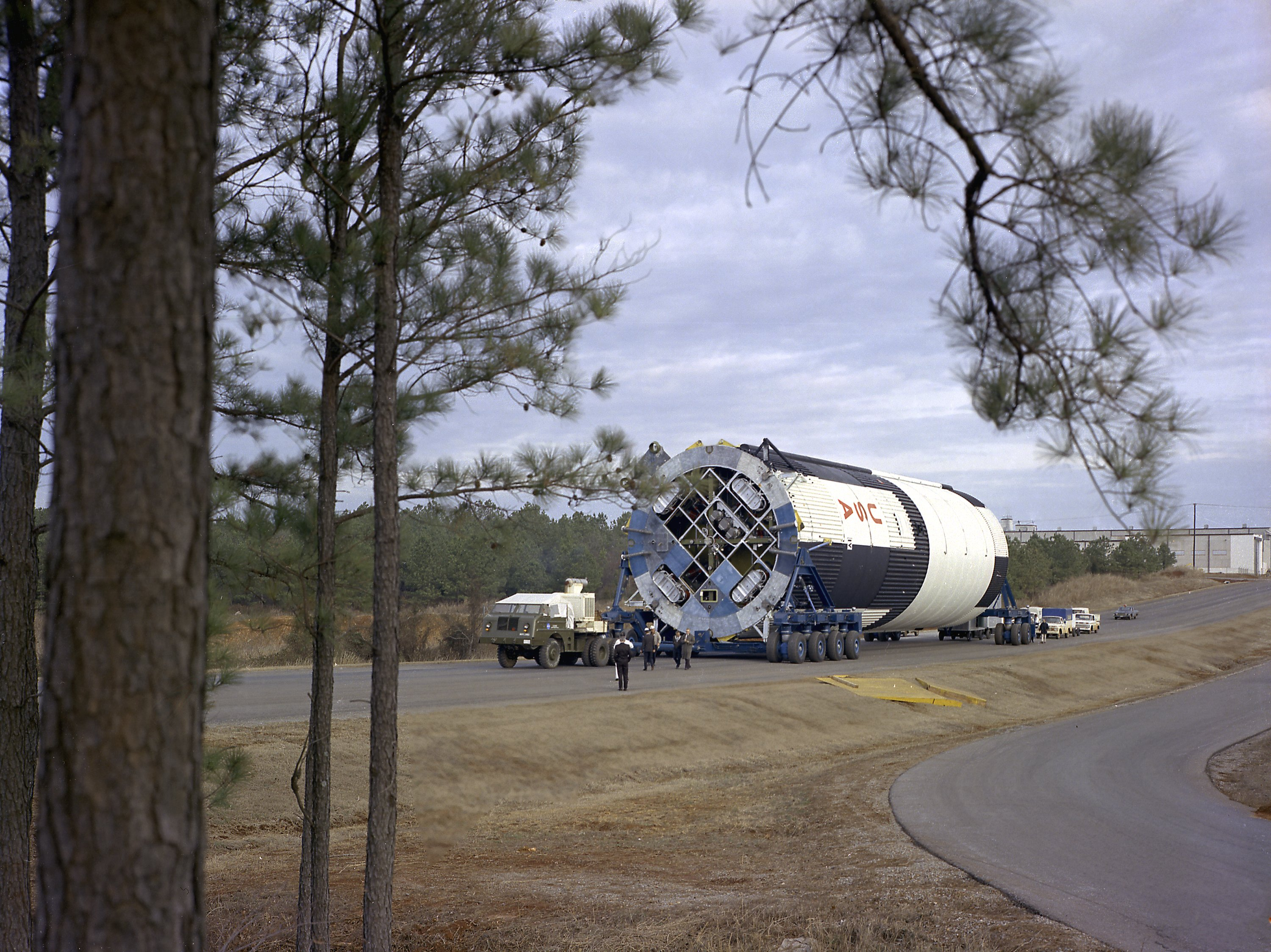
S-IC-T being taken to the B-2 Test Stand on March 1, 1965

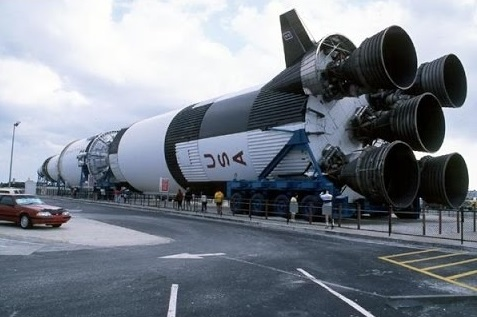
S-IC-T at Kennedy Space Center in 2017, before being put in the indoor display hall

S-IC-T is strictly a ground-based test article to be used for integrated testing as the "all systems test stage". Before S-IC-T, the first integrated test S-IC stage built, Boeing built prototype stages SA-500F and SA-500D. These prototypes were used for testing the new S-IC first stage. S-IC-T, like all following Saturn V's S-IC rockets used five Rocketdyne F-1 engines. The Rocketdyne F-1 engine was first tested in March 1959 and delivered to NASA in October 1963. The S-IC-T tests were to verify that the S-IC stage could support the firing of all five Rocketdyne F-1 engines at the same time. The testing was also a test of the two large fuel tanks. The five Rocketdyne F-1 engines produced 34,500 kN (7,750,000 lbf) of thrust, the first burn of the most powerful rocket ever. The powerful rockets caused ground shaking and smoke filled the area from the engine flames. Thus, B-2 Test Stand earned the nickname the land of the earth shakers. Boeing Company was awarded the contract to build S-IC-T on March 6, 1963, from NASA. The S-IC-T test stage was built at MSFC, starting in 1963 and complete in 1965, with the intention of static firing the article there. On March 1, 1965, the booster test stage was lifted into the newly constructed MSFC Test Stand 4670 ahead of its fully-integrated static fire test campaign. Numerous tests from single engine to the very first five-engine static fire tests were performed with the test article while at MSFC. S-IC-T was loaded onto the barge Poseidon. Poseidon was then floated 1,086.7 miles for six day, arriving at the B-1/B-2 Test Stand in Mississippi. The trip is 1,086.7 miles up the Tennessee River and then down the Mississippi River. The S-IC-T was test fired at a newly built test firing facility, called the B-2 Test Stand (S-IC-T stage), in the west test area. B-2 Test Stand is now part of the Stennis Space Center.

A crane was used to install S-IC-T into the B-2 Test Stand. Then the five F-1 engines were installed. The S-IC-T was filled with RP-1 rocket fuel and liquid oxygen (LOX) oxidizer. On the B-2 Test Stand, 18 test firings were completed over almost two years. On April 10, 1965, the first S-IC-T test was to fire one engine for 16.73 seconds. On April 16, S-IC-T fired all five engines for the first time for 6.5 seconds and reached the record 7.5 million pounds (33.36x106N) of thrust for the first time. The 7.5 million pounds of thrust was the power Wernher von Braun specified for Apollo to depart to the moon. On August 5, 1965, a full burn test was done for 2 1/2-minute (150 seconds) on all five engines. Two more 2 1/2-minute full burn test were done. The last test was done in 1967. The test included testing the gimbaled thrust movement on the four outing engines. With the successful tests of S-IC-T, the Apollo program's Saturn V rocket was able to move forward to the next step, SA-501/Apollo 4 with S-IC-1. With all testing completed, Boeing removed the S-IC-T from B-2 Test Stand on March 24, 1967.

S-IC-T is now on display on its side, inside the Apollo-Saturn V Center museum at the Kennedy Space Center. Visitors are able walk under S-IC-T. The complete Saturn V rocket, that S-IC-T is part of, has been restored for display. S-IC-T is a Historic Mechanical Engineering Landmark, listed in July 1980. Two other Saturn V Rocket sites were listed at the same time: Saturn V Rocket at the Lyndon B. Johnson Space Center and the one at the Davidson Center for Space Exploration in Huntsville, Alabama.

== S-IC-T specifications ==
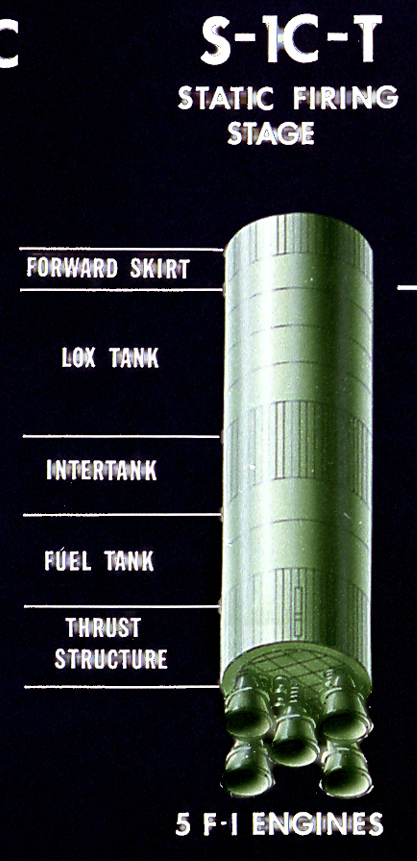
S-IC-T configuration

S-IC-T specifications:

- Height: 42 m (138 ft)
- Diameter: 10 m (33 ft)
- Mass: 5,030,000 lb (2,280,000 kg)
- Fuel, liquid oxygen and kerosene: 4,400,000 lb (2,000,000 kg)
- Kerosene RP-1: 810,700 L (178,300 imp gal; 214,200 US gal)
- Liquid oxygen: 1,311,100 L (288,400 imp gal; 346,400 US gal)
- Empty: 290,000 lb (130,000 kg)
- Intertank: 7.9 m (26 ft)
- Five F-1 engines, each 10 tons
- Static test of S-IC, first stage of Saturn V Rocket
- Power: 34,500 kN (7,750,000 lbf) thrust or about 160 million horsepower, a record

== B-2 Test Stand ==
- B-2 Test Stand part of large Rocket Propulsion Test Complex at the Stennis Space Center
- U.S. National Register of Historic Places
- U.S. National Historic Landmark
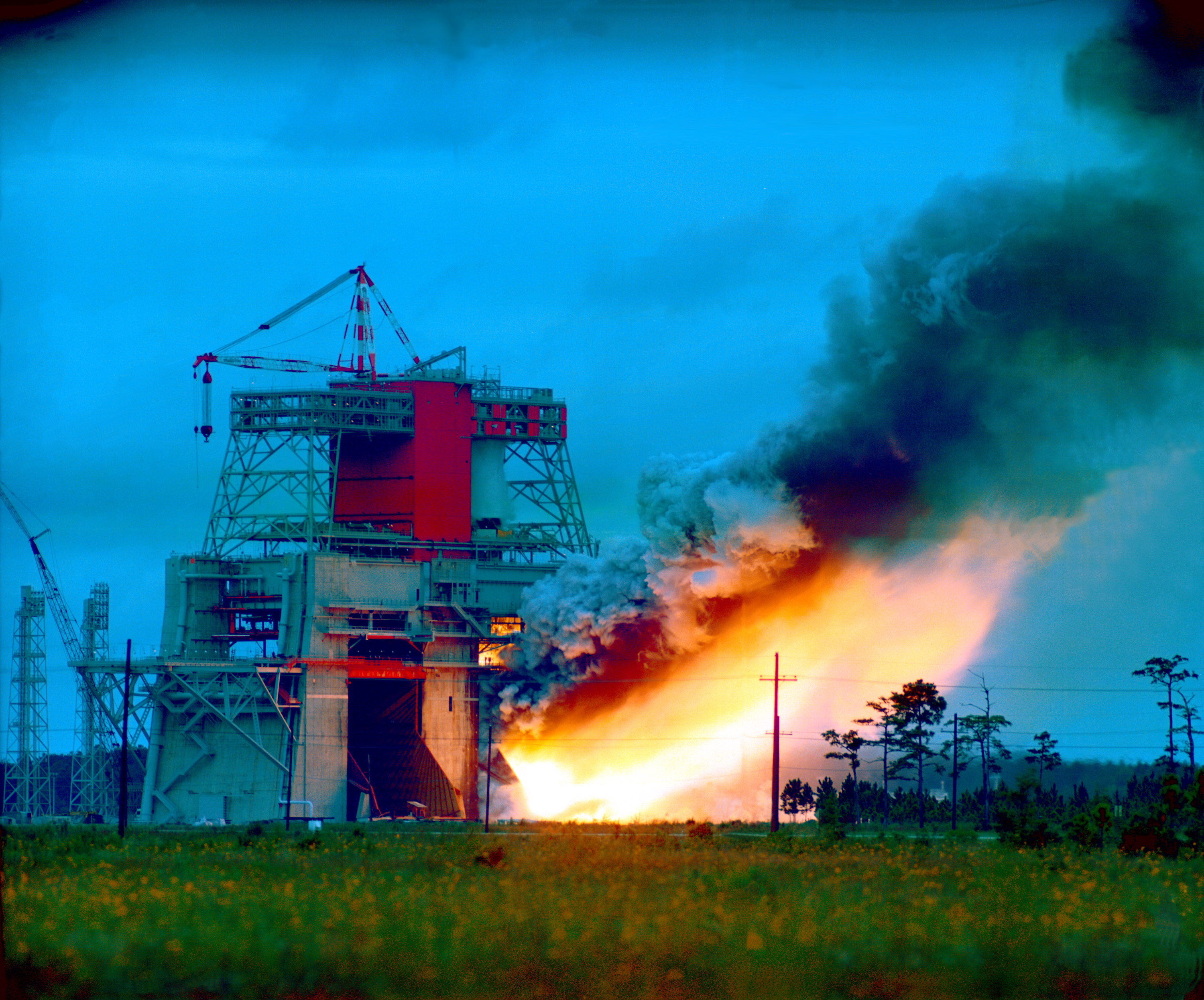
- Static Test Firing S-1C Saturn V Mississippi Test Facility MTF

- Location within Mississippi Location within the United States
- Location: Stennis Space Center in Bay St. Louis, Hancock County, Mississippi
- Coordinates: 30°21′45.96″N 89°36′00.72″W
- Area: 13,500 acres (55 km^{2})
- Built: 1961 to 1965
- Architect: NASA
- NRHP reference No.: 85002805

Significant dates
- Added to NRHP: October 3, 1985
- Designated NHL: October 3, 1985

To test S-IC-T a special test stand was built, the B-2 Test Stand, this held the rocket in place under full power test. B-2 Test Stand was designed in 1961 and construction started in June 1961. B-2 Test Stand was completed in spring 1965 at the NASA Mississippi Test Facility and the Pearl River Site, then the NASA Mississippi Test Operations, now known as Stennis Space Center since May 20, 1988 after John C. Stennis. B-2 Test Stand was built to be able to hold down 53,000 kN (12,000,000 lbf) of thrust. S-IC-T was first rocket tested on the B-2 Test Stand. Also on the B-2 Test Stand, was the testing of S-IC-1 (Apollo 4), fired two times; S-IC-2 (Apollo 6) fired once; and S-IC-3 (Apollo 8) fired one time. In 1974, the B-2 Test Stand was reconfigured to test engines, RS-25, for the Space Shuttle program. Next the stand was change to test Russian RD-180 rocket engine in 1998, used on the Atlas rockets. The Space Launch System liquid oxygen feed line was tested in 2014 on stand.

A total of 12 S-IC stages were tested on B-2 stand. The first in April 1967 and the last was in October 1970. S-IC 15 was tested but was not used, S-IC 15 is on display at the Stennis Space Center's Infinity Space Center. The RS-68 used on the Delta 4 Common Booster Core was tested from November 1999 to May 2001. Stennis Space Center has other test stands including: A-1/A-2 Test stands, A-3 Test stand, H-1 Test stand and E Test stand complex.

The B-2 Test Stand specifications:

- Concrete: 12,000,000 lb (5,400,000 kg)
- Foundation depth: 12 m (40 ft)
- Four concrete foundation leg walls: 15 m (48 ft) thick and 44 m (144 ft) tall
- Crane with a 41 m (135 ft) boom, lift up to 195 tons
- Max height: 140 m (450 ft), including crane, (largest structure in Mississippi at the time)
- Base floor space: 58 m (190 ft) by 50 m (165 ft)
- 910,000 litres (240,000 US gal) of water a minute for cooling engine exhaust
- 350,000 litres (92,000 US gal) of water per minute for vibro-acoustic protection
- Hold down 53,000 kN (12,000,000 lbf) of thrust, less in current state.

== Gallery ==
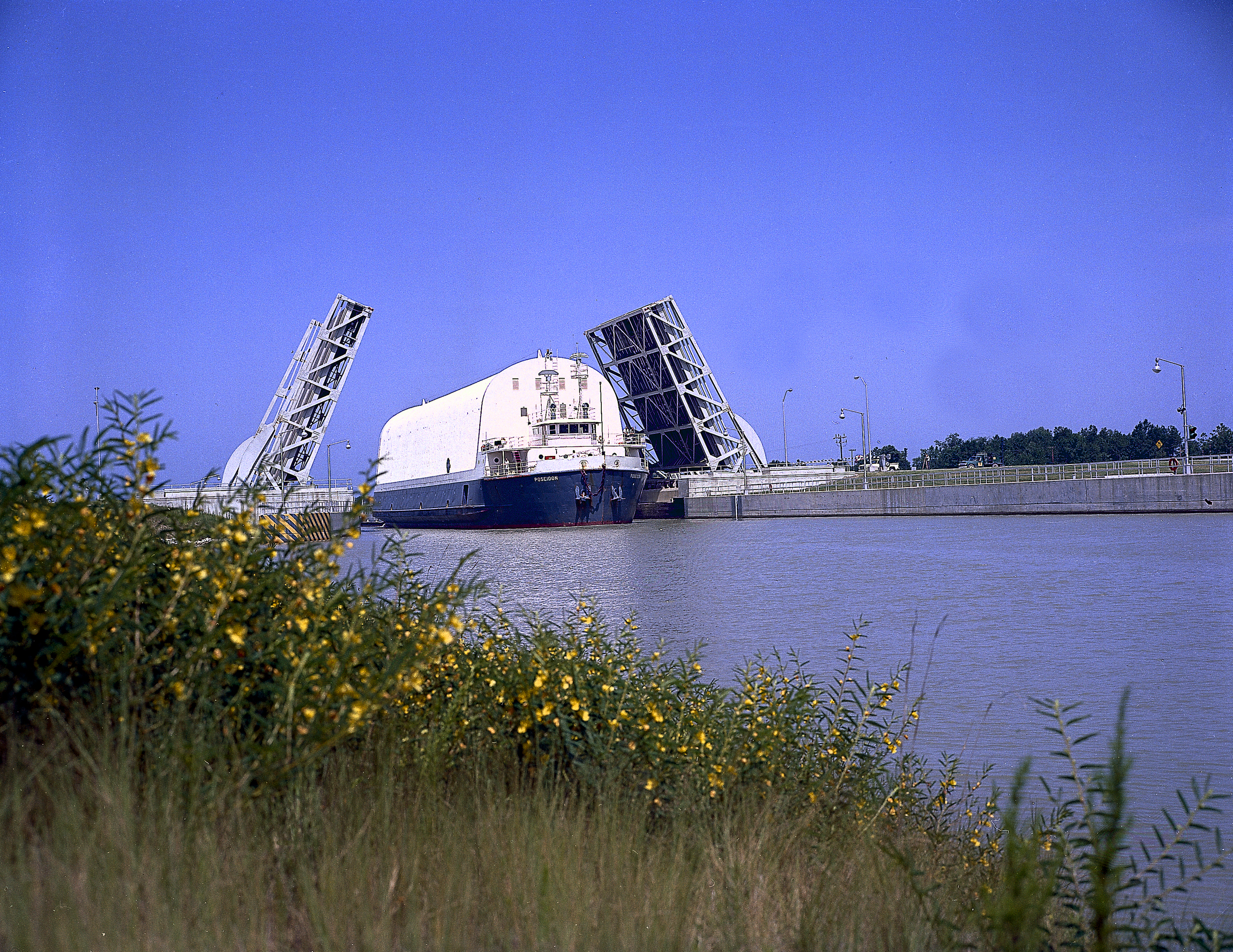
Poseidon barge transporting a Saturn V S-IC rocket from Alabama to Mississippi. The trip is 1,086.7 miles up the Tennessee River and then down the Mississippi River.

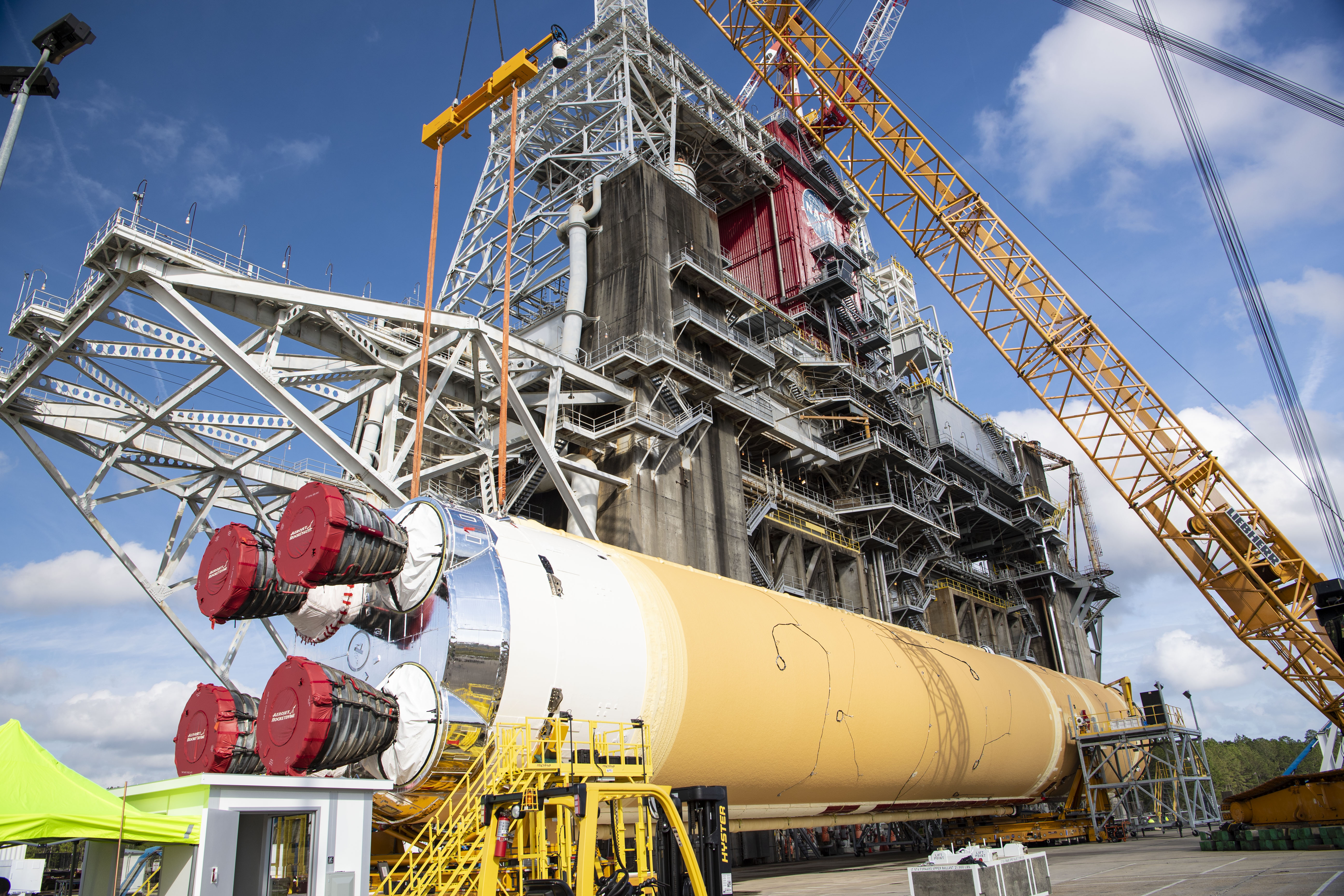
A Space Launch System Rocket Core at Stennis prior to being lifted onto the B2 test stand

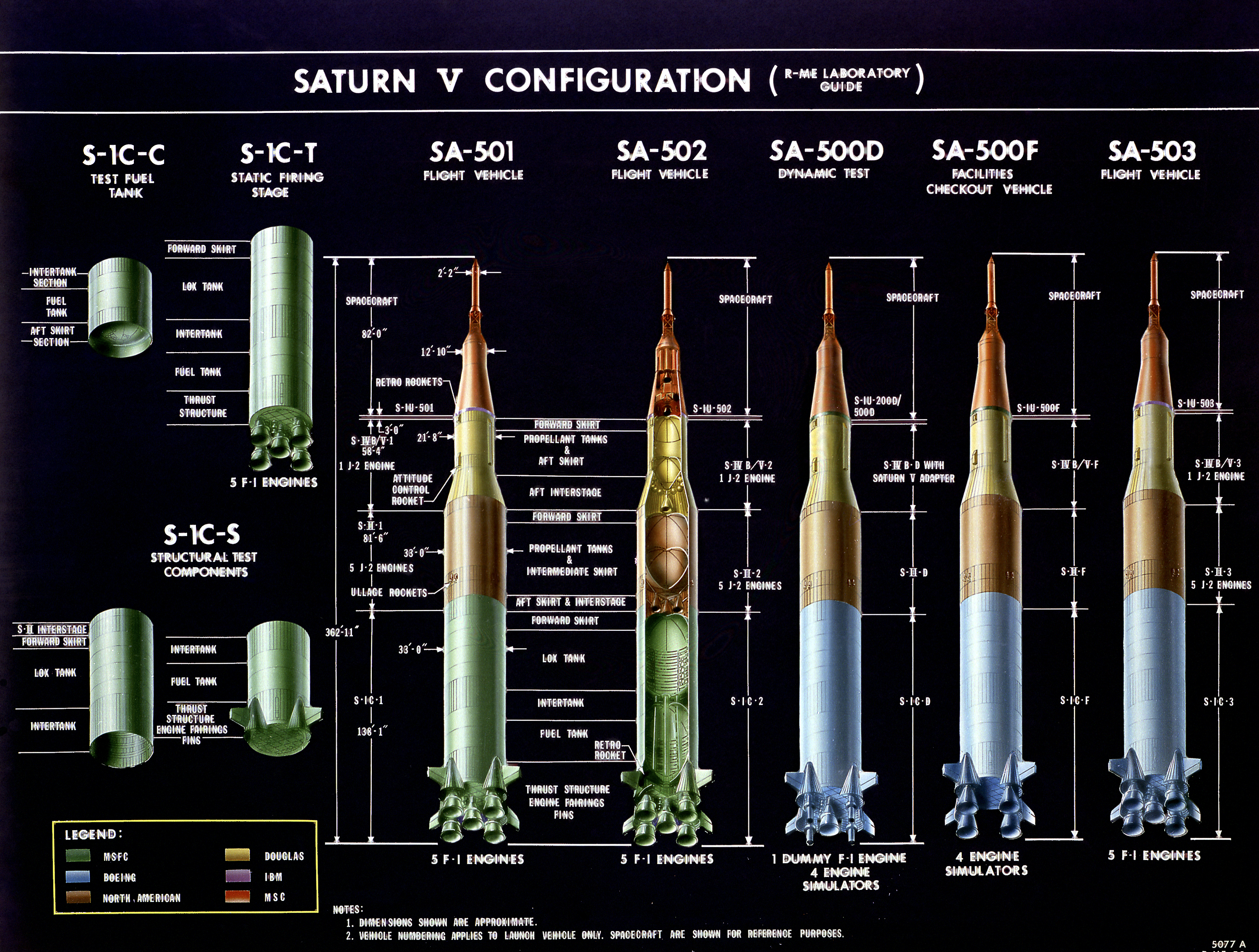
Saturn V vehicle configurations with S-IC-T in the static firing stage

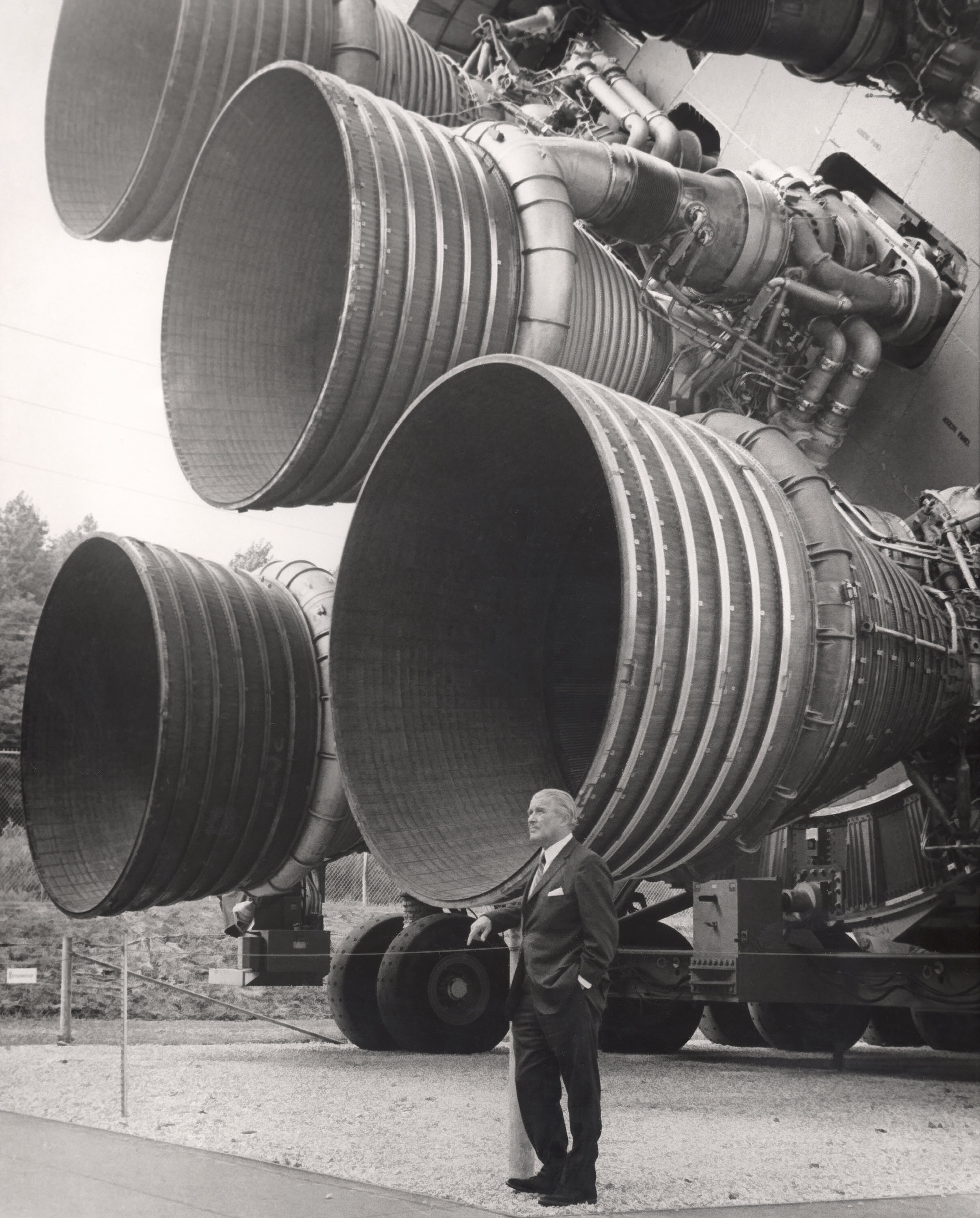
Wernher von Braun with the F-1 engines of the Saturn V first stage at the U.S. Space and Rocket Center

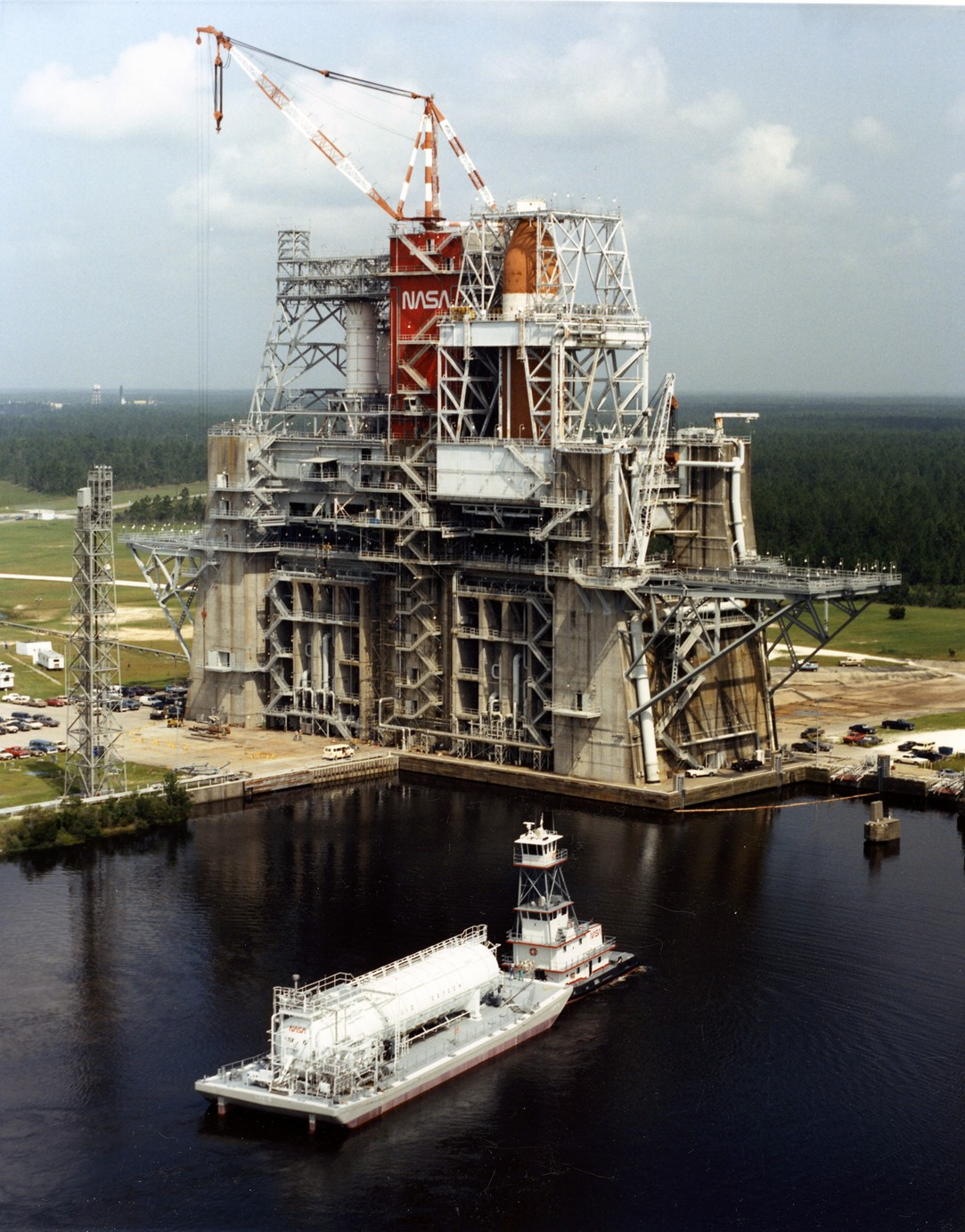
The B-2 Test Stand holding Space Shuttle component in 1987

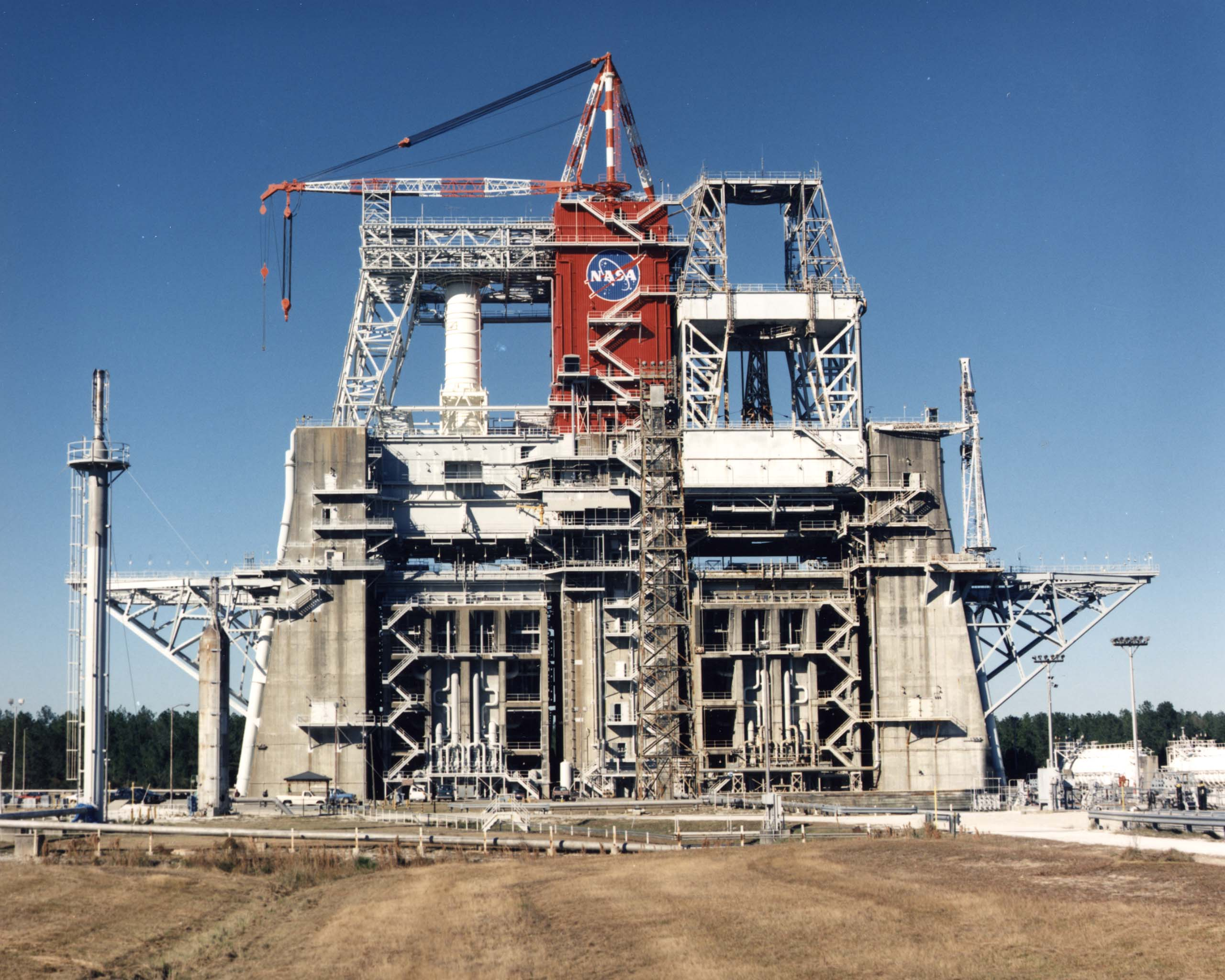
B-1 Test Stand in 1995

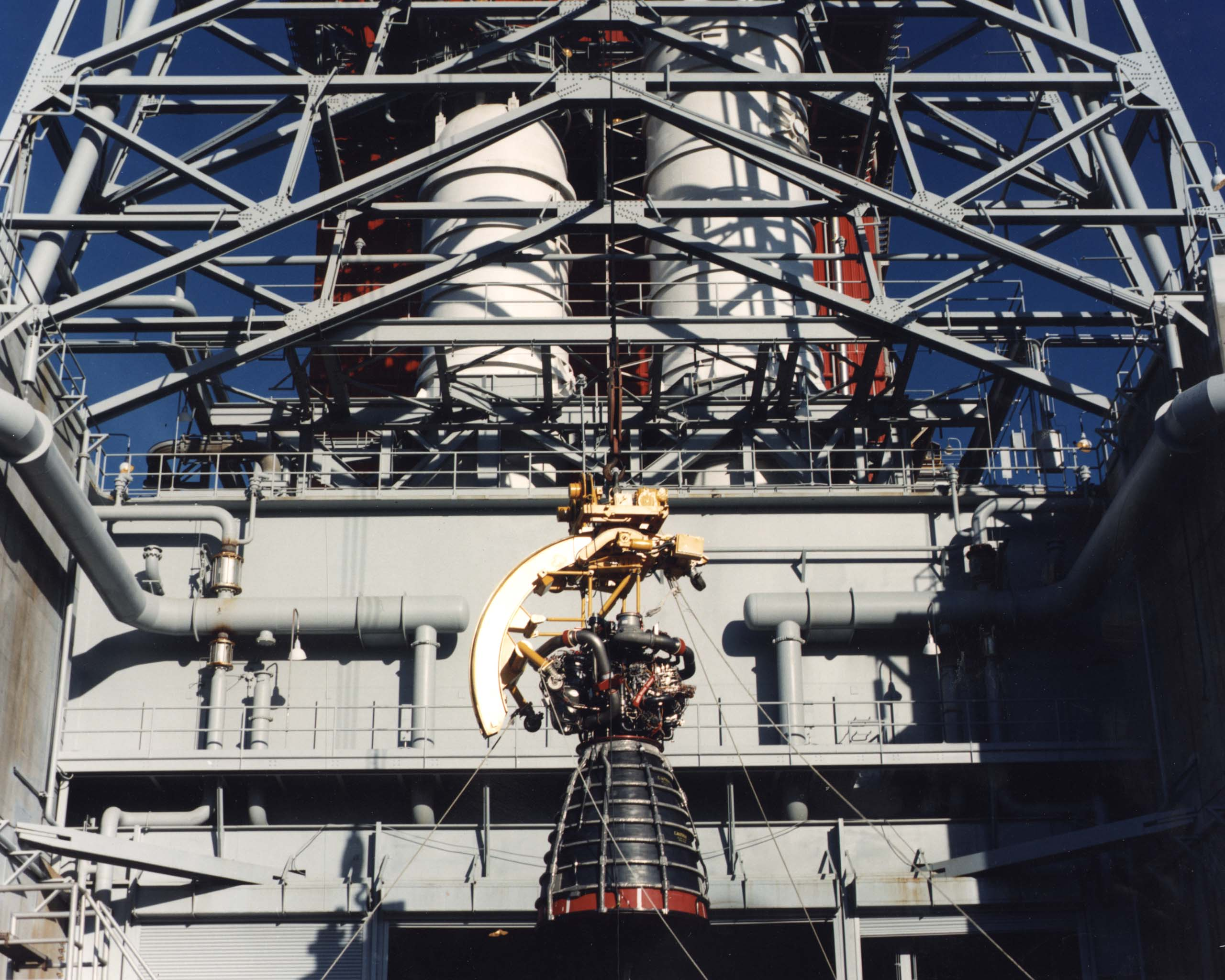
SSME is Hoisted into the B1 Test Stand in 1989

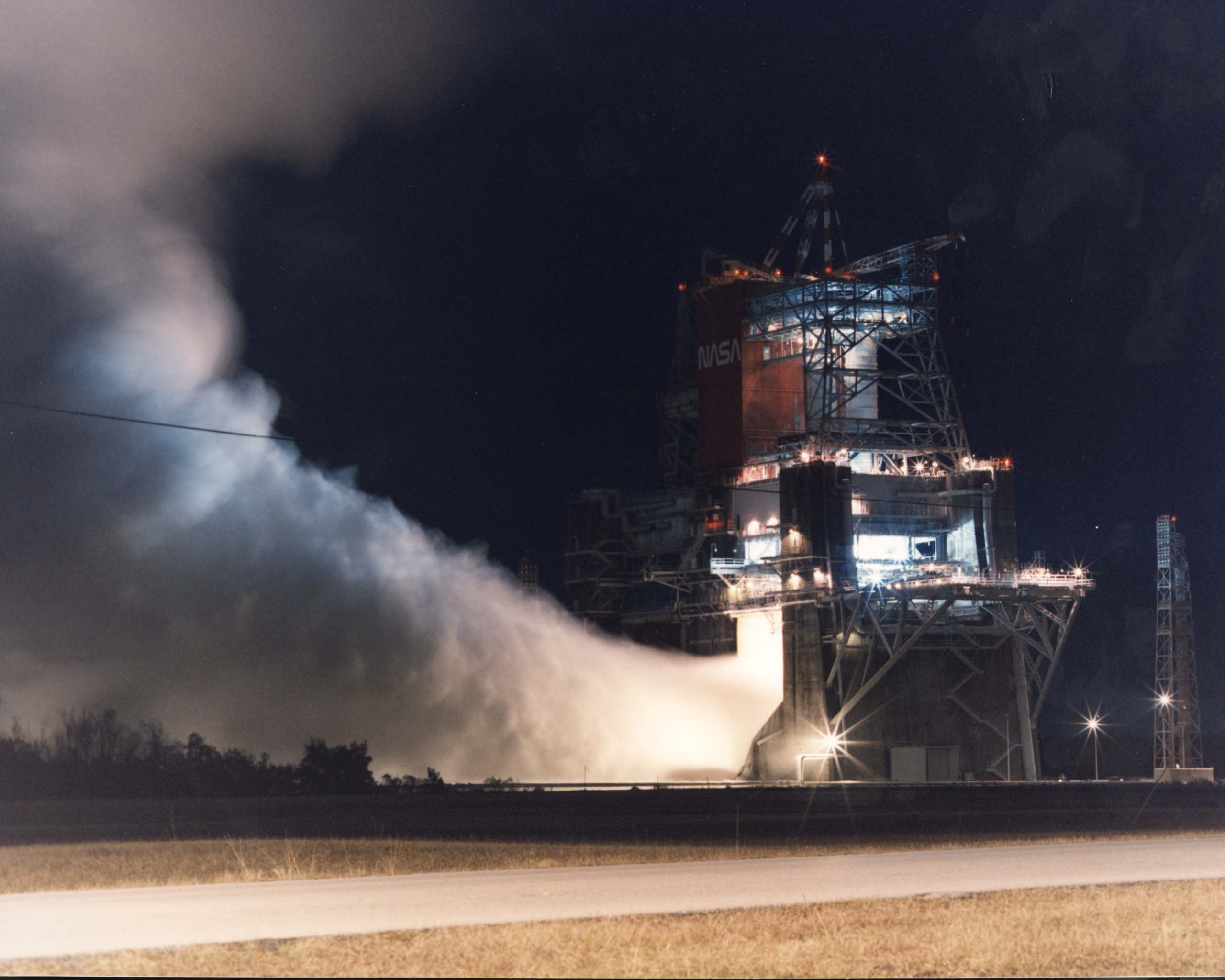
SSME Night Firing in 1992

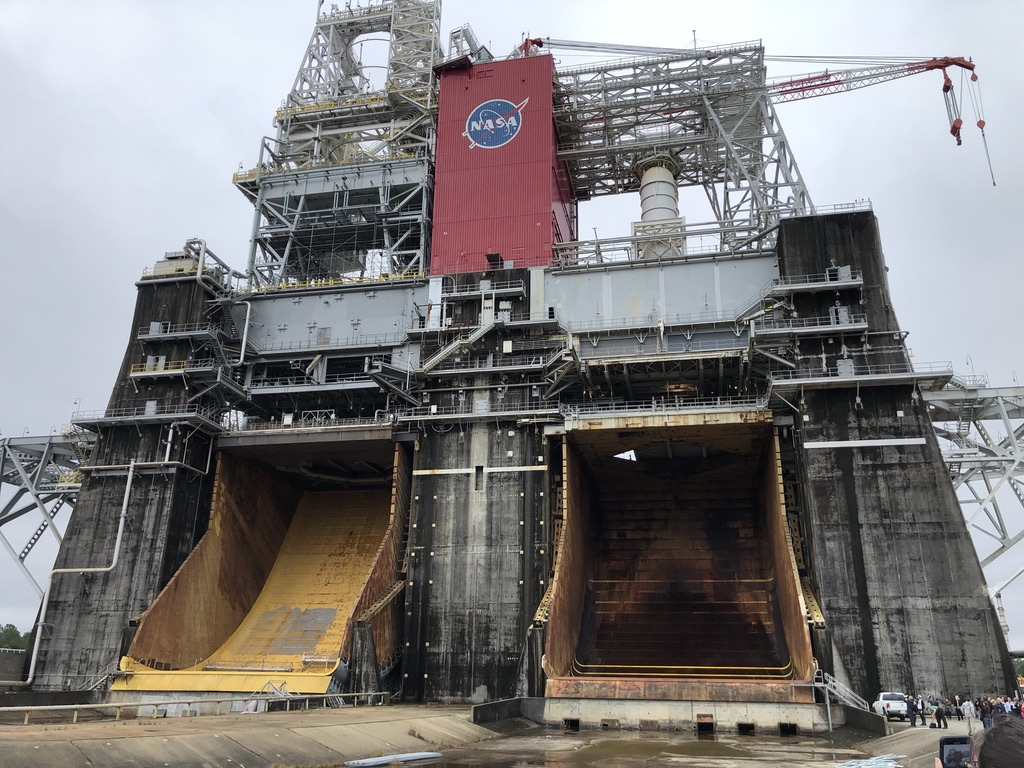
Stennis Space Center B1 Test Stand blast ports

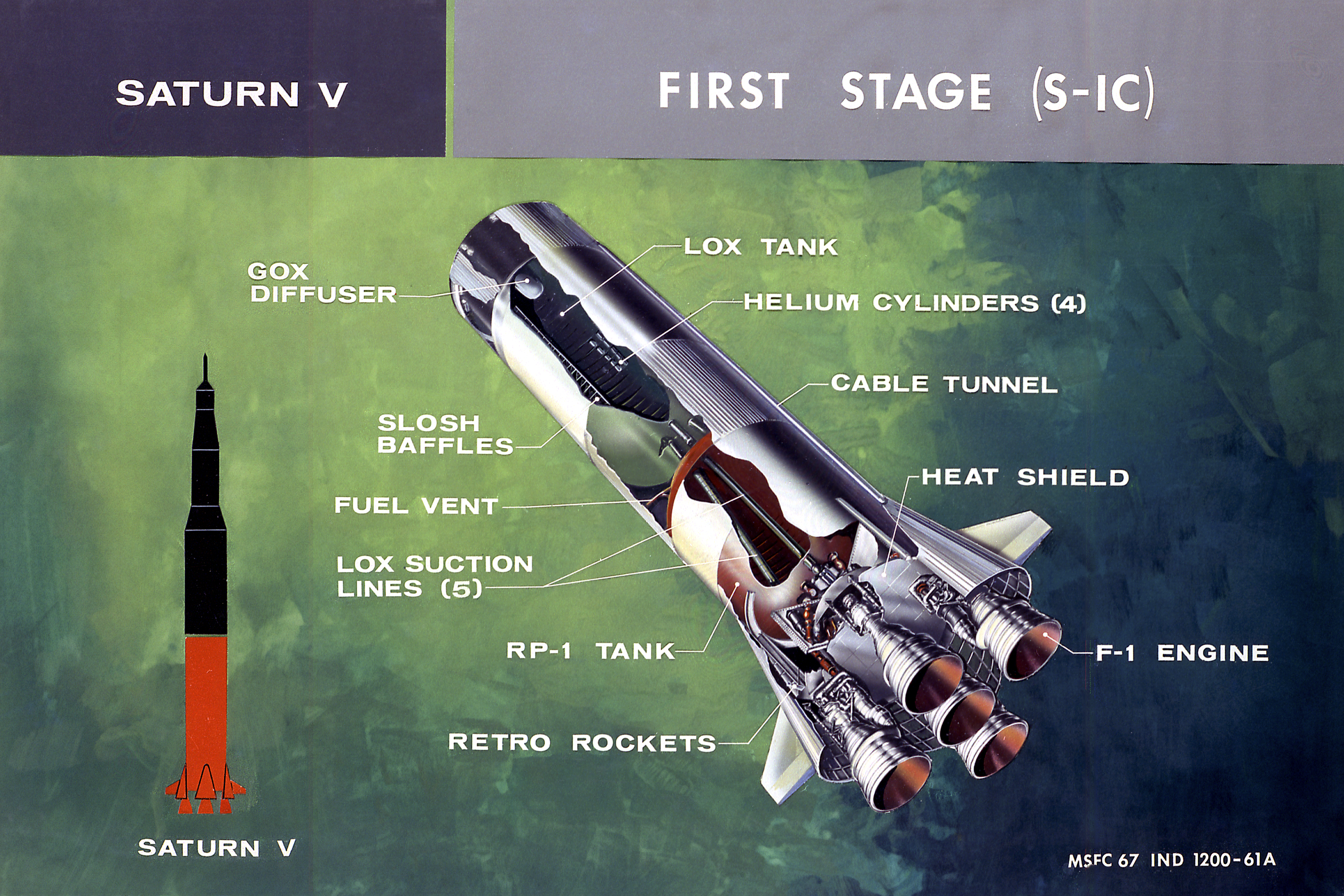
Cutaway diagram of the S-IC.

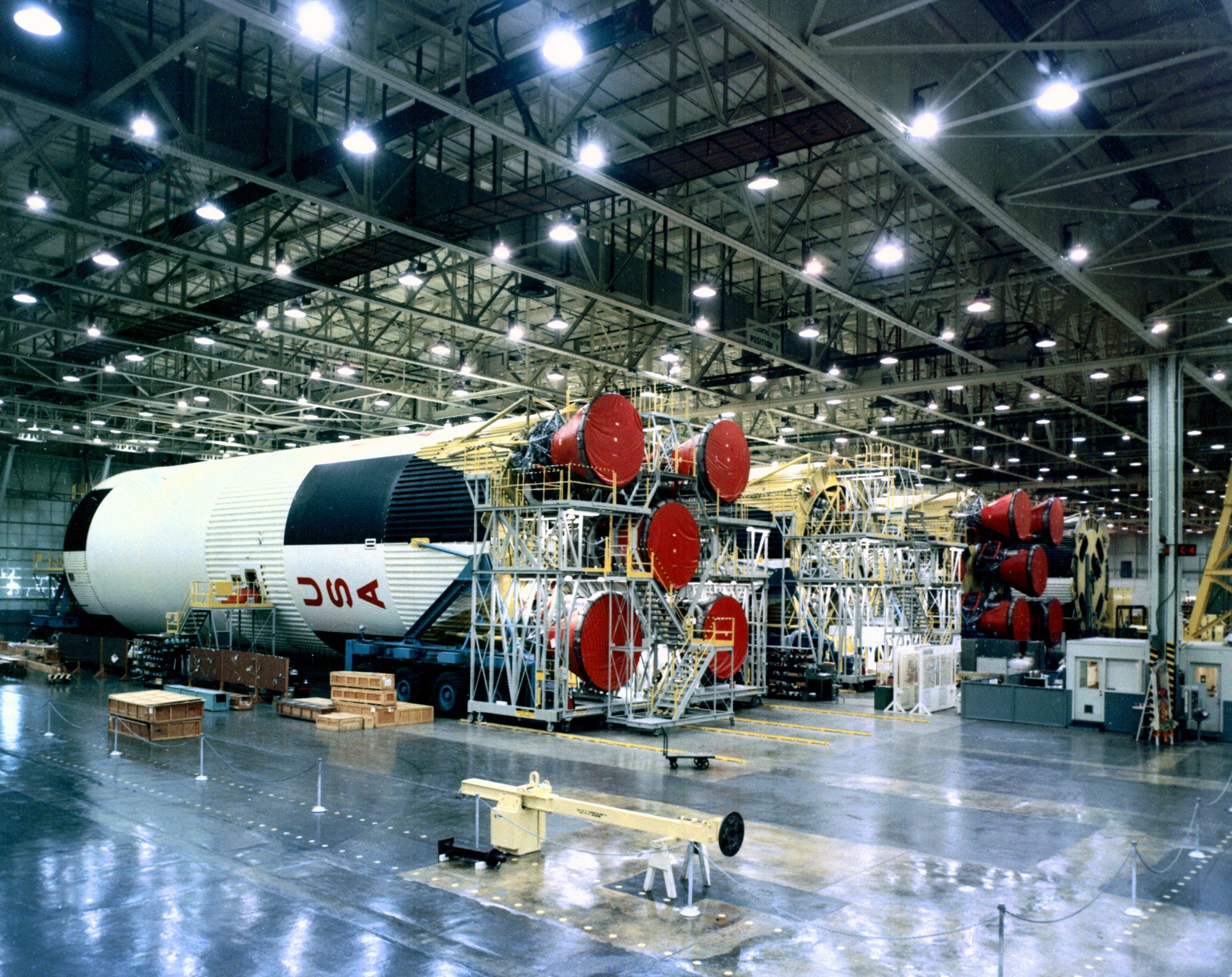
Saturn V first stages S-1C-10, S-1C-11, and S-1C-9 at Michoud Assembly Facility.

Saturn V schematic

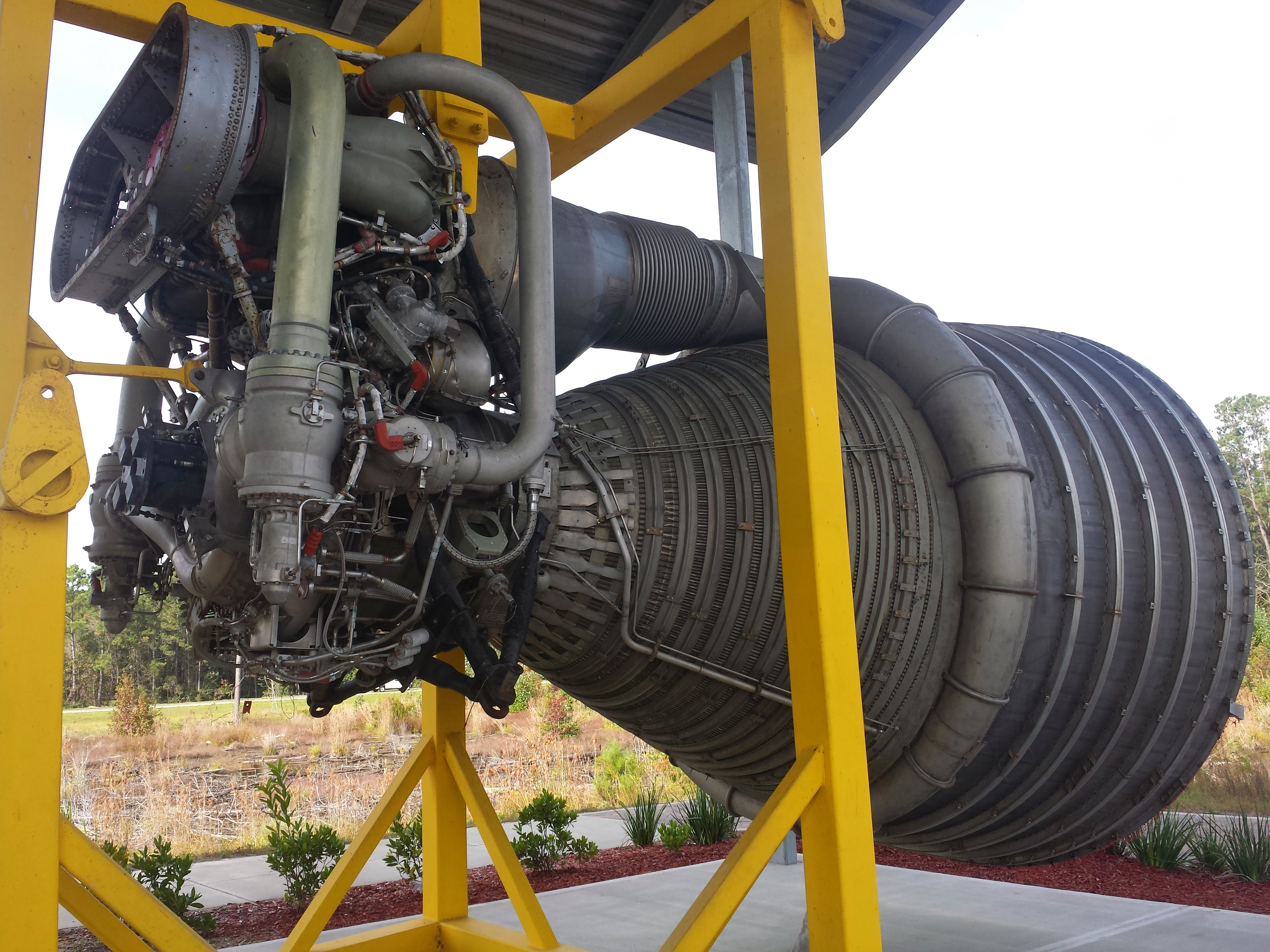
F-1 engine on display at INFINITY science center.

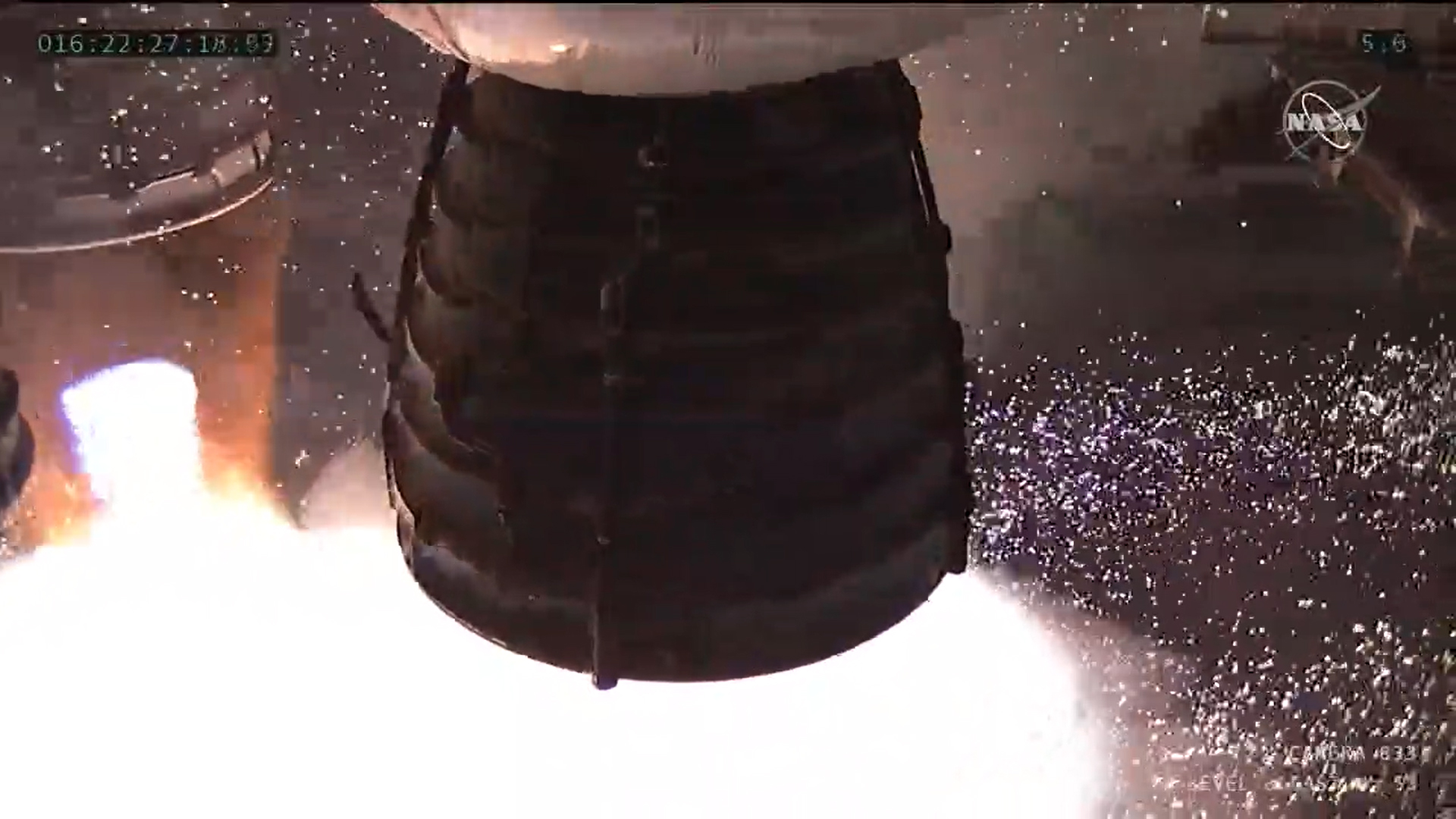
Artemis I core stage hot fire test in the B-2 Test Stand

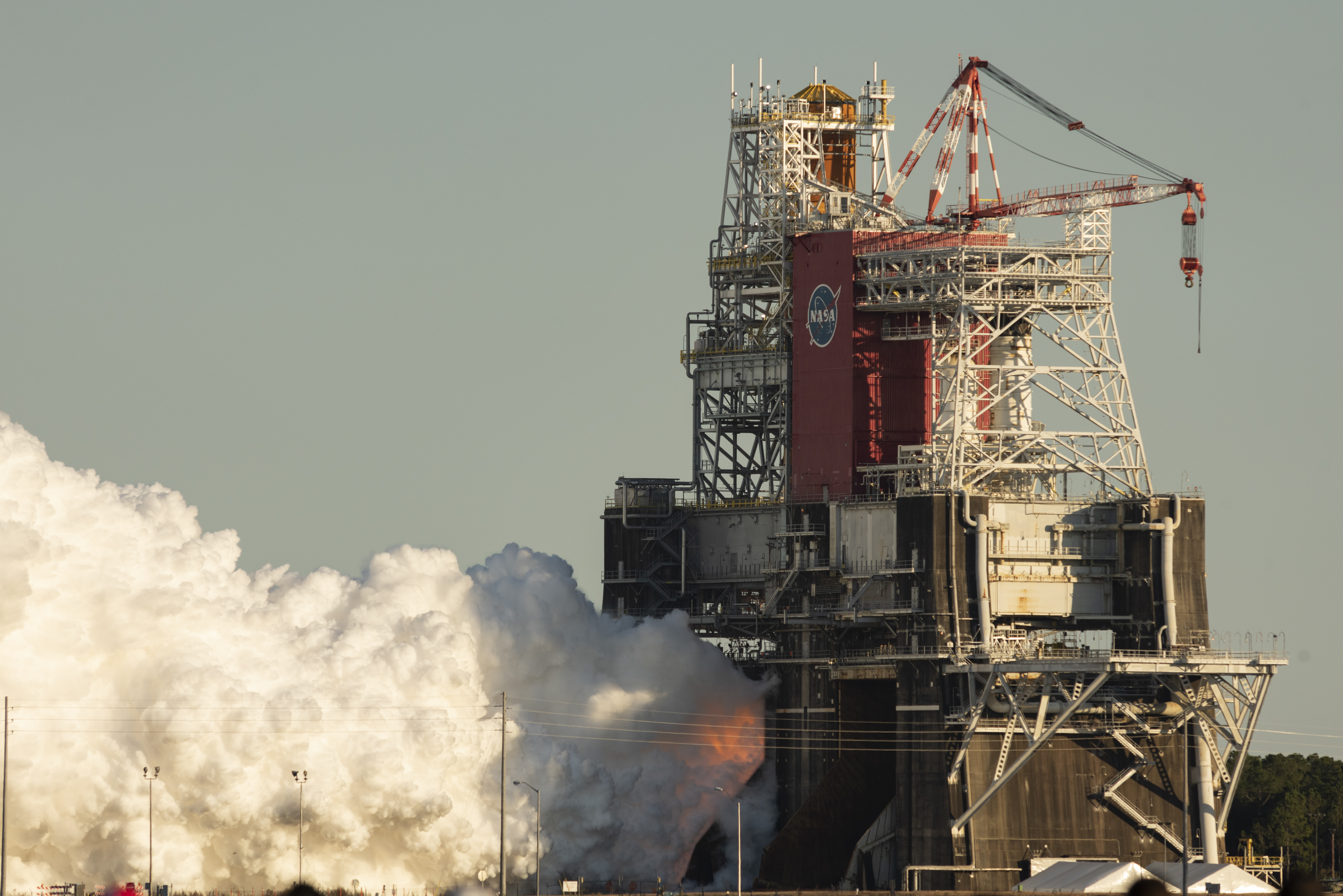
Hot Fire Test of SLS Rocket Core Stage

== See also ==
- S-II
- S-IVB
- Saturn V
- Apollo (spacecraft)
