= The Walk (band) =

Canadian alternative rock band

- Origin: Sudbury, Ontario, Canada
- Genres: alternative rock
- Years active: 1987–1996
- Label: Universal Music Group
- Past members: Dave Allan, Jason Frederick, Eric Forget, James Prudhomme, James Cahill, Bill Bruhmuller

The Walk were a Canadian alternative rock band. Originally from Sudbury, Ontario, Canada, the band was formed in 1987 by vocalist/guitarist Dave Allan, guitarist/keyboardist Jason Frederick, bass guitarist Eric Forget, and drummer James Prudhomme. They disbanded in 1996.

== History ==
The band was originally known as "Painted Black" (which featured fifth member, guitarist James Cahill) before changing its name to The Walk in 1989.

In 1990, with producer John Newlands, they released their debut album, Hollow, independently. The same year they also contributed a track to the compilation "From Under The Slag Heap", produced by campus radio station CFLR (now CKLU-FM). Sporadic touring followed, with the band opening for acts such as The Tragically Hip and Sarah McLachlan.

In 1991, the band relocated to Hamilton, Ontario, where they released their second album (with guitarist Billy Bruhmuller replacing Cahill), Insomuch. The album received national radio airplay and charted on college radio across Canada.

In 1993, The Walk became a four piece, and made what were arguably their strongest recordings with producer Colin Cripps at Hamilton's Grant Avenue Studios. Initial tracks were released as the Wellington Street EP. A full-length album followed, Turbine, produced by Cripps and mixed by Mark S. Berry. The band signed to MCA (now Universal Music Group) Canada. A promotional single and video, "Given It All Away" was released, receiving airplay on MuchMusic, and the band toured extensively, supporting acts such as Crash Vegas, Junkhouse, The Headstones, 13 Engines, Trooper, Waltons, and The Watchmen.

In 1996, after nearly a decade of being well-received critically but only middling commercial success, The Walk disbanded. Most of the members left the music industry entirely, although Frederick continues to write and release music, mostly for film and television.

== Discography ==
- Hollow (1990)
- Insomuch (1992)
- Wellington Street EP (1993)
- "Given It All Away" CD single (1994)
- Turbine (1994)
