= Jason Frederick =

- Born: 29 November 1970 (age 55); Sudbury, Ontario, Canada
- Occupations: Composer, Musician
- Years active: 1987–present

Jason Frederick (born November 29, 1970) is a Canadian multi-instrumentalist and composer of music for films and television, based in Colchester, UK.

== Early life and education ==
Frederick was born in Sudbury, Ontario. He was educated in Canada and the United States. He studied under composers Christopher Young, David Raksin, and Elmer Bernstein at the USC Thornton School of Music, as well as receiving private study with Leonard Rosenman and Joe Harnell.

== Career ==
Frederick performed with the alternative rock band The Walk from 1987 to 1996, and continues to record under the name Lomax!.

His film work includes Dawg, starring Denis Leary and Elizabeth Hurley, and 2BPerfectlyHonest, starring John Turturro and Robert Vaughn, as well as contributions to Richard Gibbs' scores for the films Big Momma's House, 28 Days, and Like Mike.

He composed the music for the television show Darcy's Wild Life, starring Sara Paxton. Other television credits include Disney's The Replacements, and the ABC Family network's Slacker Cats.

Frederick also provided additional score for Disney's 101 Dalmatians II: Patch's London Adventure, which won the 2003 DVDX award for best musical score. He provided music for the 2007 comedy-horror film Terror Tunes 2.

His music has been part of the television programmes How Clean Is Your House?, Good Girls Don't, Dirty Jobs, America's Got Talent, Oprah's Big Give, Property Ladder, Ace of Cakes, Survival of the Richest, The Amazing Race, Lassie's Pet Vet, I Didn't Know I Was Pregnant, and Wedding Central.

In addition to film and television, Frederick has also scored television advertisements, promotional trailers, and documentary subjects. He also composed and performed the wraparound segments for Showtime's On The Edge, and the opening theme for psychic Sylvia Browne's live stadium appearances.

He has played on recordings with artists Billy Preston, and Peter Thomas, and has played on soundtrack sessions for film and television.

In about 2010, Frederick moved to Colchester, United Kingdom, where, with his band The Cinematic Trio, he has presented a series of shows mixing musical performances with film sequences.

In 2012, Frederick recorded with the band Death by Chocolate on their album Brick-a-Brac. In 2015 his album Mods and Coppers received airplay on community radio in Ontario.
