= Turbo (disambiguation) =

A turbo, written as the clipping of "turbocharger", is a turbine-driven air induction device.

Turbo may also refer to:

== Science and technology ==
- Turbo (gastropod), a genus of sea snails
- Turbopump, a fuel pump
- Turbomolecular pump, a device capable of producing high vacuum (extremely low pressures)

=== Computing ===
- AMD Turbo Core, a technology implemented by AMD that allows the processor to dynamically adjust its operating frequency
- Intel Turbo Boost, Intel's trade name for a feature that automatically raises its processors' operating frequency
- Turbo (software), an application virtualization and distribution environment for Microsoft Windows
- Turbo button, on computers to select one of two run states: a default "turbo" speed or a slower speed
- Turbo code, a form of error-correction coding, usually used in telecommunications

== Arts, entertainment and media ==
=== Fictional characters ===
- Turbo (comics), a superheroine in the Marvel Comics universe
- Turbo (Gobots), a fictional character in the Gobots cartoon and toy line
- Turbo, a film character in Breakin' and Breakin' 2: Electric Boogaloo
- Turbo, a character in Disney's Wreck-It Ralph
- Turbo Norimaki, a fictional character from the anime and manga series Dr. Slump
- Turbo, the titular character of the 2013 film listed below

=== Film and television ===
- Turbo (2013 film), a 2013 animated film by DreamWorks Animation
- Turbo (2024 film), a 2024 Indian Malayalam-language film by Mammootty Kampany
- Turbo Zone, an infotainment program by GMA Network that aired in November 2020
- Power Rangers Turbo, a Power Rangers franchise television series that aired in 1997
  - Turbo: A Power Rangers Movie, a 1997 film in the Power Rangers franchise

=== Gaming ===
- Turbo (video game), a Sega arcade game released in 1981
- TurboGrafx-16, a video game console by NEC Corporation
- TrackMania Turbo, a Ubisoft video game released in 2016
- Turbo, a mod for the computer game Half-Life

=== Music ===
==== Albums and EPs ====
- Turbo (Judas Priest album)
- Turbo (The Pietasters album)
- Turbo (EP), an EP by Sonic Boom Six

==== Groups ====
- Turbo (Czech band) is a Czech band founded in 1981
- Turbo (Polish band), a Polish heavy metal band
- Turbo (South Korean band), a Korean dance group

== People ==
- Marcius Turbo, 2nd century Roman general
- Conor Turbitt, Gaelic footballer nicknamed "Turbo"
- Turbo B (Durron Maurice Butler, born 1967), American rapper and musician
- Turbo (record producer), American record producer and songwriter
- Turbo (street dancer), British street dancer, musician and entertainer
- Magnus Svensson (footballer) (born 1969), Swedish association footballer nicknamed "Turbo"

== Other uses ==
- Turbo, Colombia, a port city
- Turbo, Eldoret, a settlement in Uasin Gishu County, Kenya
- Turbo (train), a 1960s high-speed train in Canada
- Turbo (chewing gum), a brand of Turkish chewing gum
- Turbo (finance), financial instrument
- Turbo, a mascot of the Houston Rockets basketball team
- Turbo tournament, in Poker
- Porsche (model) Turbo, a version of a series of cars

== See also ==
- Turbo C, an integrated development environment for the C programming language
- Turbo C++, an integrated development environment for the C programming language
- Turbo Pascal, an integrated development environment for the Pascal programming language
- Turbo Tango, "aerosol" packaging for Tango
- Convection oven, also known as a turbo
- Porsche 911 Turbo, a series of cars
- Shell Turbo Chargers a basketball team in the Philippine Basketball Association from 2000—2005
- Turbot (a homophone), a type of fish
- Turb (disambiguation)
