= Turbine (album) =

Turbine was the third full-length album by The Walk, released in 1994. Initially released independently on Gritty City Records, the album received a national release later the same year on MCA (now Universal Music Group) Canada.

The album was produced by Colin Cripps with assistance from Dave Rave. Guest musicians on the album included Tim Gibbons and Dan Achen of Junkhouse.

The album was recorded at Grant Avenue Studios in Hamilton, Ontario, and mixed by Mark S. Berry at Metalworks Studios in Mississauga, Ontario.

A cd single and video were released for "Given It All Away".

== Track listing ==
1. "Given It All Away"
2. "Fine"
3. "Break"
4. "The Price I Pay"
5. "Unimpressed"
6. "To Even Be So"
7. "The Call"
8. "Beautiful and Boring"
9. "When You Go"
10. "Bouncy 'C'"
11. "Puzzle Pieces"
12. "Asphalt"
13. "Away"
