= Trade Union Research Bureau =

Defunct Canadian non-profit organization

- Abbreviation: TURB
- Established: 1945; 81 years ago
- Founder: Bert Marcuse; Emil Bjarnason; Eric Bee
- Dissolved: December 31, 2012; 13 years ago
- Type: Non-profit organization, research institute
- Location: Vancouver, British Columbia

Trade Union Research Bureau (TURB) was an independent labour research organization in Vancouver, British Columbia. In 1937, a branch of the San Francisco-based Pacific Coast Labor Bureau was established in Vancouver. Eight years later in 1945, the TURB was established as an independent entity by founding director Bert Marcuse, Emil Bjarnason, and Eric Bee. It provided research for most trade unions located in the province before closing on December 31, 2012. Its archives are held at Simon Fraser University.
