= Italian destroyer Turbine =

Turbine was the name of at least three ships of the Italian Navy and may refer to:

- Italian destroyer Turbine (1901), a Nembo-class destroyer launched in 1901 and sunk in 1915.
- Italian destroyer Espero (1904), a Nembo-class destroyer launched in 1904 and renamed Turbine in 1921. She was discarded in 1923.
- Italian destroyer Turbine (1927), a Turbine-class destroyer launched in 1927 and taken over by the Kriegsmarine as TA14 in 1943, she was sunk in 1944.
