= RP-1 =

Highly refined form of kerosene used as rocket fuel

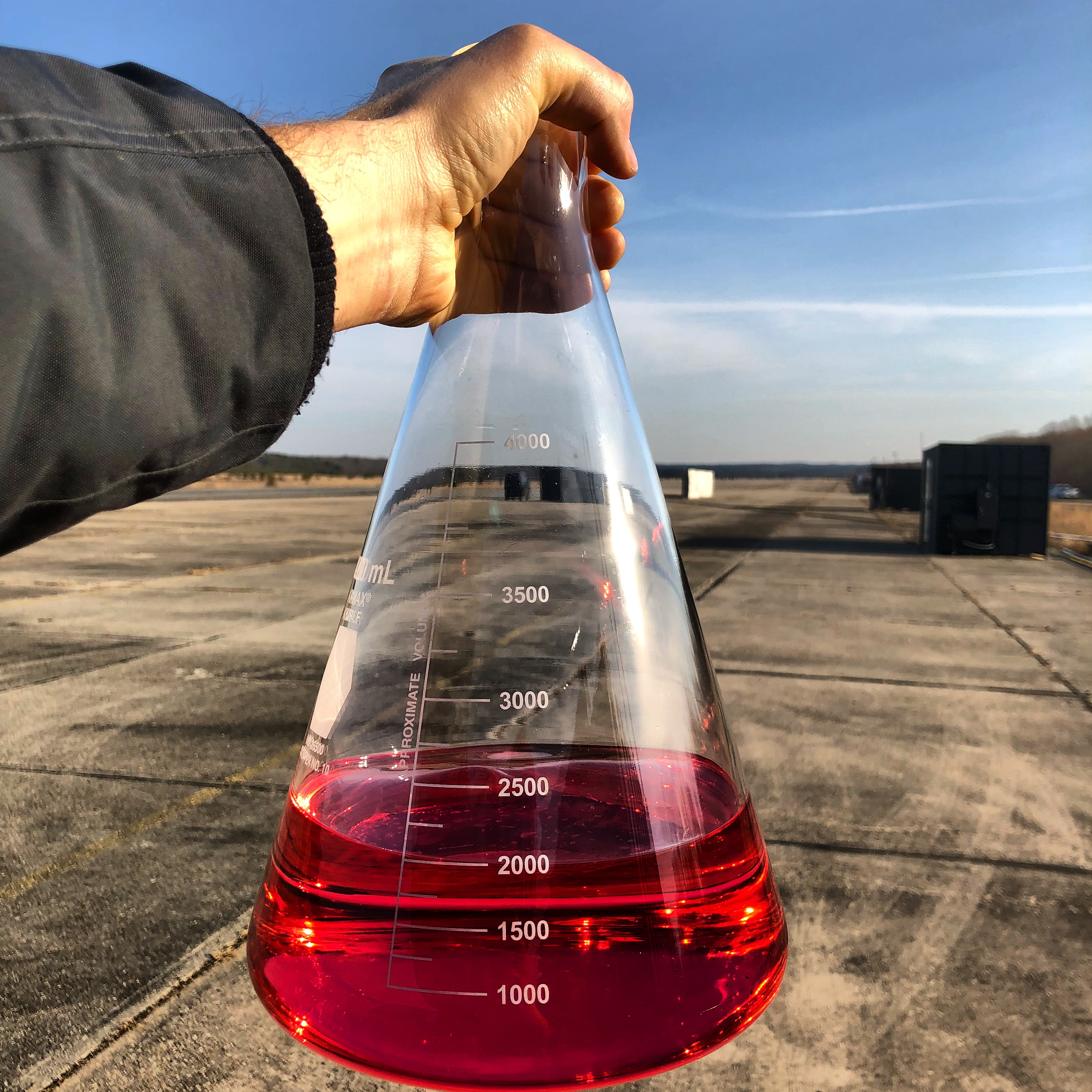
An Erlenmeyer flask containing about two litres (1/2 US gallon) of RP-1. It is dyed red but has a natural clear to pale yellow color.

RP-1 (Rocket Propellant-1 or Refined Petroleum-1) and similar fuels like RG-1 and T-1 are highly refined kerosene formulations used as rocket fuel. Liquid-fueled rockets that use RP-1 as fuel are known as kerolox rockets. In their engines, RP-1 is atomized, mixed with liquid oxygen (LOX), and ignited to produce thrust. Developed in the 1950s, RP-1 is outwardly similar to other kerosene-based fuels like Jet A and JP-8 used in turbine engines but is manufactured to stricter standards. While RP-1 is widely used globally, the primary rocket kerosene formulations in Russia and other former Soviet countries are RG-1 and T-1, which have slightly higher densities.

Compared to other rocket fuels, RP-1 provides several advantages with a few tradeoffs. Compared to liquid hydrogen, it offers a lower specific impulse, but can be stored at ambient temperatures, has a lower explosion risk, and although its specific energy is lower, its higher density results in greater energy density. Compared to hydrazine, another liquid fuel that can be stored at ambient temperatures, RP-1 is far less toxic and carcinogenic.

== Usage and history ==
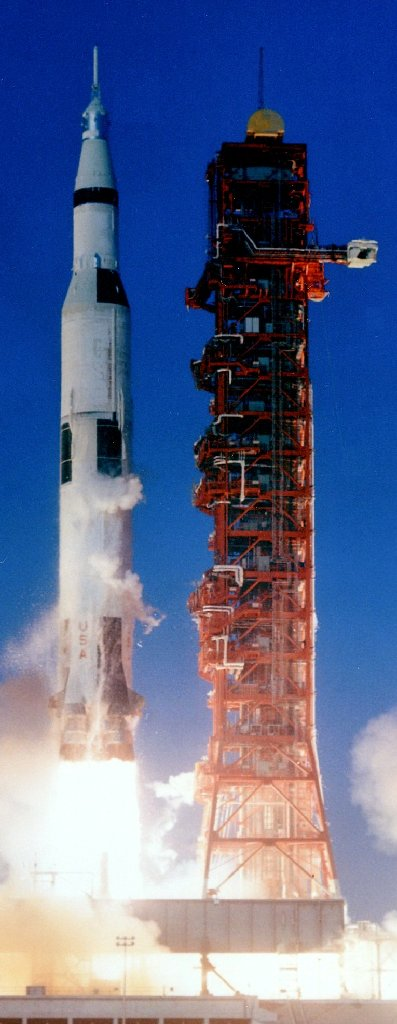
Apollo 8, Saturn V with 810,700 litres of RP-1 and 1,311,100 liters of LOX in the S-IC first stage

RP-1 is a fuel in the first-stage boosters of the Electron, Soyuz, Zenit, Delta I-III, Atlas, Falcon, Antares, and Tronador II rockets. It also powered the first stages of the Energia, Titan I, Saturn I and IB, and Saturn V. The Indian Space Research Organisation (ISRO) is also developing an RP-1 fueled engine named SE-2000 for its future rockets.

=== Development ===
During and immediately after World War II, alcohols (primarily ethanol, occasionally methanol) were commonly used as fuels for large liquid-fueled rockets. Their high heat of vaporization kept regeneratively-cooled engines from melting, especially considering that alcohols would typically contain several percent water. However, it was recognized that hydrocarbon fuels would increase engine efficiency, due to a slightly higher density, the lack of an oxygen atom in the fuel molecule, and negligible water content. Regardless of which hydrocarbon was chosen, it would also have to replace alcohol as a coolant.

Many early rockets burned kerosene, but as burn times, combustion efficiencies, and combustion-chamber pressures increased, engine masses decreased, which led to unmanageable engine temperatures. Raw kerosene used as coolant tends to dissociate and polymerize. Lightweight products in the form of gas bubbles cause cavitation, and heavy ones in the form of wax deposits block narrow cooling passages in the engine. The resulting coolant starvation raises temperatures further, and causes more polymerization which accelerates breakdown. The cycle rapidly escalates (i.e., thermal runaway) until an engine wall rupture or other mechanical failure occurs, and it persists even when the entire coolant flow consists of kerosene. In the mid-1950s rocket designers turned to chemists to formulate a heat-resistant hydrocarbon, with the result being RP-1.

During the 1950s, LOX (liquid oxygen) became the preferred oxidizer to use with RP-1, though other oxidizers have also been employed.

== Fractions and formulation ==
RP-1 is outwardly similar to other kerosene-based fuels, but is manufactured to stricter standards. These include tighter density and volatility ranges, along with significantly lower sulfur, olefin, and aromatic content.

Sulfur and sulfur compounds attack metals at high temperatures, and even very small amounts of sulfur assist polymerization which can harden seals and tubing, therefore sulfur and sulfur compounds are kept to a minimum.

Unsaturated compounds (alkenes, alkynes, and aromatics) are also held to low levels, as they tend to polymerize at high temperatures and long periods of storage. At one time, it was thought that kerosene-fueled missiles might remain in storage for years awaiting activation. This function was later transferred to solid-fuel rockets, though the high-temperature benefits of saturated hydrocarbons remained. Because of the low levels of alkenes and aromatics, RP-1 is less toxic than various jet and diesel fuels, and far less toxic than gasoline.

The more desirable isomers were selected or synthesized, with linear alkanes being reduced in number in favor of greater numbers of cyclic and highly branched alkanes. Just as cyclic and branched molecules improve octane rating in petrol, they also significantly increase thermal stability at high temperatures. The most desirable isomers are polycyclics such as ladderanes.

In contrast, the main applications of kerosene (aviation, heating, and lighting), are much less concerned with thermal breakdown and therefore do not require stringent optimisation of their isomers.

In production, these grades are processed tightly to remove impurities and side fractions. Ashes were feared likely to block fuel lines and engine passages, and wear away valves and turbopump bearings, as these are lubricated by the fuel. Slightly too-heavy or too-light fractions affected lubrication abilities and were likely to separate during storage and under load. The remaining hydrocarbons are at or near C_{12} mass. Because of the lack of light hydrocarbons, RP-1 has a high flash point and is less of a fire hazard than petrol.

All told, the final product is much more expensive than common kerosene. Any petroleum can produce RP-1 with enough refining, though real-world rocket-grade kerosene is sourced from a small number of oil fields with high-quality base stock, or it can be artificially synthesized. This, coupled with the relatively small demand in a niche market compared to other petroleum users, drives RP-1's high price. Military specifications of RP-1 are covered in MIL-R-25576, and the chemical and physical properties of RP-1 are described in NISTIR 6646.

In Russia and other former Soviet countries, the two main rocket kerosene formulations are T-1 and RG-1. Densities are slightly higher, 0.82 to 0.85 g/mL, compared to RP-1 at 0.81 g/mL.

The Soviets also discovered that even higher densities could be achieved by chilling the kerosene before loading it into the rocket's fuel tanks, although this partially defeated the purpose of using kerosene over other super-chilled fuels. However, operationally, facilities were already in place to manage the vehicle's cryogenic liquid oxygen and liquid nitrogen, both of which are far colder than the kerosene. The launcher's central kerosene tank is surrounded on four sides and the top by liquid oxygen tanks with a liquid nitrogen tank at the bottom. The kerosene tanks of the four boosters are relatively small and compact, also located between a liquid oxygen and a liquid nitrogen tank. Thus, once the kerosene was initially chilled, it would remain cold for the brief time needed to finish launch preparations.

While the Soviets would eventually abandon chilling their kerosene, decades later SpaceX would revisit the idea for their Falcon 9 rocket. All versions since the Falcon 9 Full Thrust have used sub-cooled RP-1, chilled to −7 °C (20 °F), giving a 2.5%–4% density increase.

== Comparison with other fuels ==
LOX/kerosene
I_{sp} at sea level	220–301.5 s
I_{sp} in vacuum	292–340 s
Oxidizer-to-fuel ratio	2.56
Density (g/mL)	0.81–1.02
Heat capacity ratio	1.24
Temperature of combustion	3,670 K

Chemically, a hydrocarbon propellant is less mass-efficient than hydrogen, although typically achieving a higher density and simpler handling than hydrogen.

For rocket engines, specific impulse (I_{sp}) differs from other engines' (turbines' or pistons') efficiencies: due to the rocket equation, efficiency is derived from exhaust velocity, not from total energy. As such, it can be beneficial to use less energy overall in exchange for lower-molecular-mass exhaust, meaning that chemical rocket engines achieve their peak efficiency at non-stoichiometric ratios. In particular, since the oxygen is heavier than the carbon or hydrogen, essentially all combustion rocket engines run fuel-rich to reduce the exhaust molecular mass, increasing exhaust velocity and thus specific impulse (and as a side benefit, temperature and cooling are reduced too). This effect favors lighter elements like pure hydrogen. However, total thrust also matters, especially deep inside a gravity well, and the density of kerosene enables considerably higher power and thrust than hydrogen (relative to engine mass).

All told, due to higher energy-per-mass and lower molecular mass, hydrogen engines achieve 370 to 465 s, while kerosene engines generate an I_{sp} in the range of 270 to 360 s; conversely, kerosene has the better handling, density, and thrust-to-weight properties. One common solution is to use a multistage rocket, where the first stage uses kerosene where thrust matters most, and the upper stages use hydrogen where specific impulse matters more. Examples of this dual-fuel architecture include the Saturn V moon rocket and the Atlas V workhorse.

Methane serves as a middle-ground between hydrogen and kerosene, offering middling molecular mass and efficiency, middling handling, middling coking/buildup properties, and density only slightly worse than kerosene. Since methane's handling difficulties, while worse than kerosene, are about the same as liquid oxygen, that means a methalox rocket is nearly as easy to handle as a kerolox rocket, but with the improved efficiency and cleanliness (which remain worse than hydrogen). Furthermore, these balances in efficiency-vs-power makes methane more suitable for a single-fuel rocket, which have proven more economical than dual-fuel rockets (due to less complexity). As such, methalox has made a resurgence in popularity in 21st century rockets, at the expense of hydrolox (better efficiency) and kerolox (better handling). Examples include Starship, New Glenn, the first stage of Vulcan, and Zhuque-2.

During engine shutdown, fuel flow goes to zero rapidly, while the engine is still quite hot. Residual and trapped fuel can polymerize or even carbonize at hot spots or in hot components. Even without hot spots, heavy fuels can create a petroleum residue, as can be seen in gasoline, diesel, or jet fuel tanks that have been in service for years. Rocket engines have cycle lifetimes measured in minutes or even seconds, preventing truly heavy deposits. However, rockets are much more sensitive to a deposit, as described above. Thus, kerosene systems generally entail more teardowns and overhauls, creating operations and labor expenses. This is a problem for expendable engines, as well as reusable ones, because engines must be ground-fired some number of times before launch. Even cold-flow tests, in which the propellants are not ignited, can leave residues.

On the upside, below a chamber pressure of about 1,000 psi (7 MPa), kerosene can produce sooty deposits on the inside of the nozzle and chamber liner. This acts as a significant insulation layer and can reduce the heat flow into the wall by roughly a factor of two. Most modern hydrocarbon engines, however, run above this pressure, therefore this is not a significant effect for most engines.

Recent heavy-hydrocarbon engines have modified components and new operating cycles, in attempts to better manage leftover fuel, achieve a more-gradual cooldown, or both. This still leaves the problem of non-dissociated petroleum residue. Other new engines have tried to bypass the problem entirely, by switching to light hydrocarbons such as methane or propane gas. Both are volatiles, so engine residues simply evaporate. If necessary, solvents or other purgatives can be run through the engine to finish dispersion. The short-chain carbon backbone of propane (a C_{3} molecule) is very difficult to break; methane, with a single carbon atom (C_{1}), is technically not a chain at all. The breakdown products of both molecules are also gases, with fewer problems due to phase separation, and much less likelihood of polymerization and deposition. However, methane (and to a lesser extent propane) reintroduces handling inconveniences that prompted kerosenes in the first place.

The low vapor pressure of kerosenes gives safety for ground crews. However, in flight the kerosene tank needs a separate pressurization system to replace fuel volume as it drains. Generally, this is a separate tank of liquid or high-pressure inert gas, such as nitrogen or helium. This adds extra cost and weight. Cryogenic or volatile propellants generally do not need a separate pressurant; instead, some propellant is expanded (often with engine heat) into low-density gas and routed back to its tank. A few highly volatile propellant designs do not even need the gas loop; some of the liquid automatically vaporizes to fill its own container. Some rockets use gas from a gas generator to pressurize the fuel tank; usually, this is exhaust from a turbopump. Although this saves the weight of a separate gas system, the loop now has to handle a hot, reactive gas instead of a cool, inert one.

Regardless of chemical constraints, RP-1 has supply constraints due to the very small size of the launch-vehicle industry versus other consumers of petroleum. While the material price of such a highly refined hydrocarbon is still less than many other rocket propellants, the number of RP-1 suppliers is limited. A few engines have attempted to use more standard, widely distributed petroleum products such as jet fuel or even diesel (for example, ABL Space Systems' E2 engine can run on either RP-1 or Jet-A). By using alternate or supplemental engine cooling methods, some engines can tolerate the non-optimal formulations.

Any hydrocarbon-based fuel produces more air pollution when burned than hydrogen alone. Hydrocarbon combustion produces carbon dioxide (CO_{2}), carbon monoxide (CO), and hydrocarbon (HC) emissions, while hydrogen (H_{2}) reacts with oxygen (O_{2}) to produce only water (H_{2}O), with some unreacted H_{2} also released. Both hydrocarbon-based fuels and hydrogen fuel will create oxides of nitrogen (NO_{x}) pollutants, because rocket exhaust temperatures above 1,600 °C (2,900 °F) will thermally combine some of the nitrogen (N_{2}) and oxygen (O_{2}) already present in the atmosphere, to create oxides of nitrogen.

== RP-1-like fuels ==
Robert H. Goddard's initial rockets used gasoline.

While the RP-1 specification was being developed, Rocketdyne was experimenting with diethyl cyclohexane. While superior to RP-1, it was never adopted for use – its formulation was not finished before development of Atlas and Titan I (designed around RP-1) leading to RP-1 becoming the standard hydrocarbon rocket fuel.

Soviet formulations are discussed above. In addition, the Soviets briefly used syntin (Russian: синтин), a higher-energy formulation, used in upper stages. Syntin is 1-methyl-1,2-dicyclopropyl cyclopropane (C_{10}H_{16}). Russia is also working to switch the Soyuz-2 from RP-1 to "naftil" or "naphthyl".

After the RP-1 standard, RP-2 was developed. The primary difference is an even lower sulfur content. However, as most users accept RP-1, there was little incentive to produce and stock a second, even rarer and more expensive formulation.

The OTRAG group launched test vehicles using more common blends. In at least one instance, a rocket was propelled by diesel fuel. However, no OTRAG rocket came even close to orbit.
