= Arthur Goldman =

Arthur Goldman may refer to:

- Arthur E. Goldman (born 1953), NASA director
- Arthur Goldman (cricketer) (1868–1937), Australian cricketer
