= Robin Henderson =

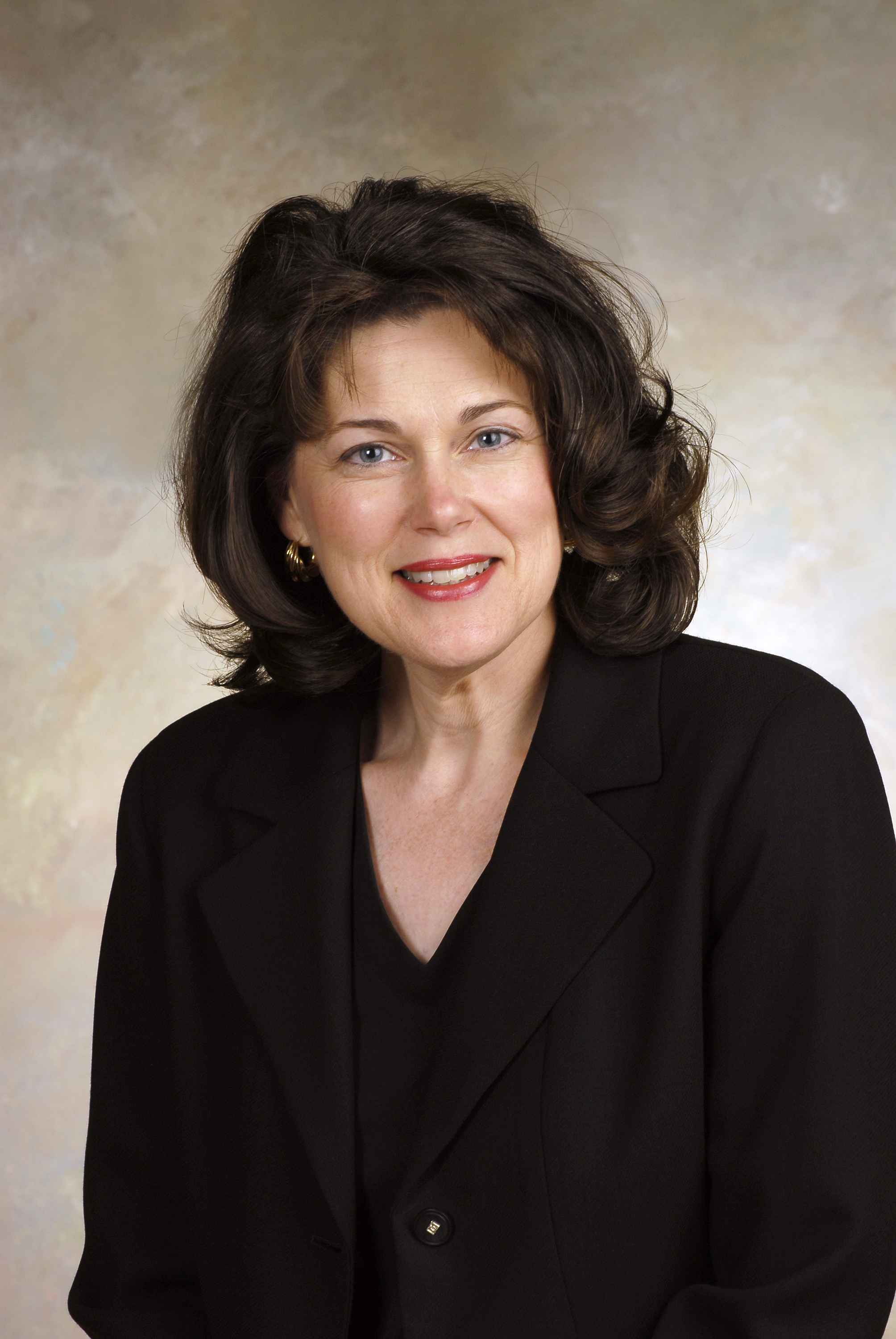
- Official NASA portrait
- Born: 1960 (age 65–66); Decatur, Alabama
- Education: University of Alabama
- Occupation: NASA administrator
- Title: Associate Director of the Marshall Space Flight Center
- Spouse: Cecil W. Henderson Jr.
- Children: 3
- Website: Marshall Leadership

Robin Neely Henderson is the Associate Director, Management, of the NASA Marshall Space Flight Center located in Huntsville, Alabama. She was named to become the center's Acting Director effective August 3, 2012, following the retirement of the previous director, Arthur E. Goldman, to take a private sector position. On September 25, 2012, NASA named Patrick Scheuermann as the center's new permanent director.

== Career ==
Henderson joined the Marshall Space Flight Center (MSFC) in 1983. She worked as a technical analyst for the Hubble Space Telescope Project Planning & Control Office until 1986. In 1986, she accepted a one-year assignment to support the International Space Station Program Office at NASA Headquarters in Washington, D.C. In 1987, she served as a technical analyst for the Space Station Projects Office.

From 1988 to 1990, she was assistant to the manager of the Space Systems Project Office. Henderson was business manager for the Upper Stages Project Office from 1990 to 1993, "supervising all business aspects of the Marshall Center's development of expendable rocket stages and associated systems". From 1993 to 1995, Henderson was the business manager of NASA's Microgravity Projects Office and from 1995 to 1997 she served as that office's deputy project manager.

From 1998 to 2002, she was deputy manager of the Microgravity Research Program Office. From 2002 to 2004, Henderson was the chief operating officer of the National Space Science and Technology Center. In that role, she managed center operations and recommended business strategies to the center's executive director. Henderson was appointed as associate director of management for the Marshall Space Flight Center in August 2004.

On July 9, 2012, Marshall's acting director, Arthur E. "Gene" Goldman, announced that he would be leaving NASA to become the executive director for Aerojet's Southeast Space Operations division. That same day, NASA announced that Henderson, Marshall's associate director of management, would replace Goldman as acting director of the center effective August 3, 2012. On September 25, 2012, NASA named Patrick Scheuermann, then serving as director of NASA's John C. Stennis Space Center, as the new permanent director of the Marshall Space Flight Center.

== Awards and honors ==
Over the course of Henderson's NASA career, she has been honored multiple times for her work with the agency. In 1996, she was awarded the NASA Exceptional Achievement Medal for "outstanding contributions in planning and developing multiple microgravity projects". In 2005, she received the NASA Outstanding Leadership Medal for her "outstanding leadership, dedication and professionalism" during the Marshall Center's "realignment with NASA's initiative calling for new exploration of the moon, Mars and beyond". In 2006, she was presented the Presidential Rank Award for "outstanding leadership and service" with NASA.

Henderson has received several NASA Group Achievement Awards and Special Service Awards for her "exceptional contributions toward reaching NASA's space mission goals". In 2004, Henderson served as president of the Marshall Management Association, an organization of MSFC executives and employees that "supports excellence across the work force" and "participates in education initiatives designed to inspire and nurture future generations of engineers, scientists and space explorers".

== Education ==
Henderson is a graduate of Austin High School in Decatur, Alabama. She enrolled at the University of Alabama in Huntsville as a business major but after working as a co-op student at Martin Marietta, Henderson shifted her course of studies. She transferred to the University of Alabama in Tuscaloosa, Alabama, where she earned a bachelor's degree in industrial engineering in 1983. She was named a University of Alabama College of Engineering Distinguished Engineering Fellow in 2010.

== Personal life ==
Born Robin Neely, Henderson is a native of Decatur, Alabama. She and her husband, Cecil W. Henderson Jr., have three grown children.
