= Gene Goodman =

Gene Goodman may refer to:

- Gene Goodman, candidate in the 2010 United States House of Representatives elections in Michigan
- Gene Goodman, inductee of the Songwriters Hall of Fame and 1997 winner of the Abe Olman Publisher Award

== See also ==
- Gene Goldman (born 1953), American space agency executive
- Eugene Goodman, police officer
- Eugene Goodman (businessman)
