= Marshall Space Flight Center =

NASA research facility in Alabama

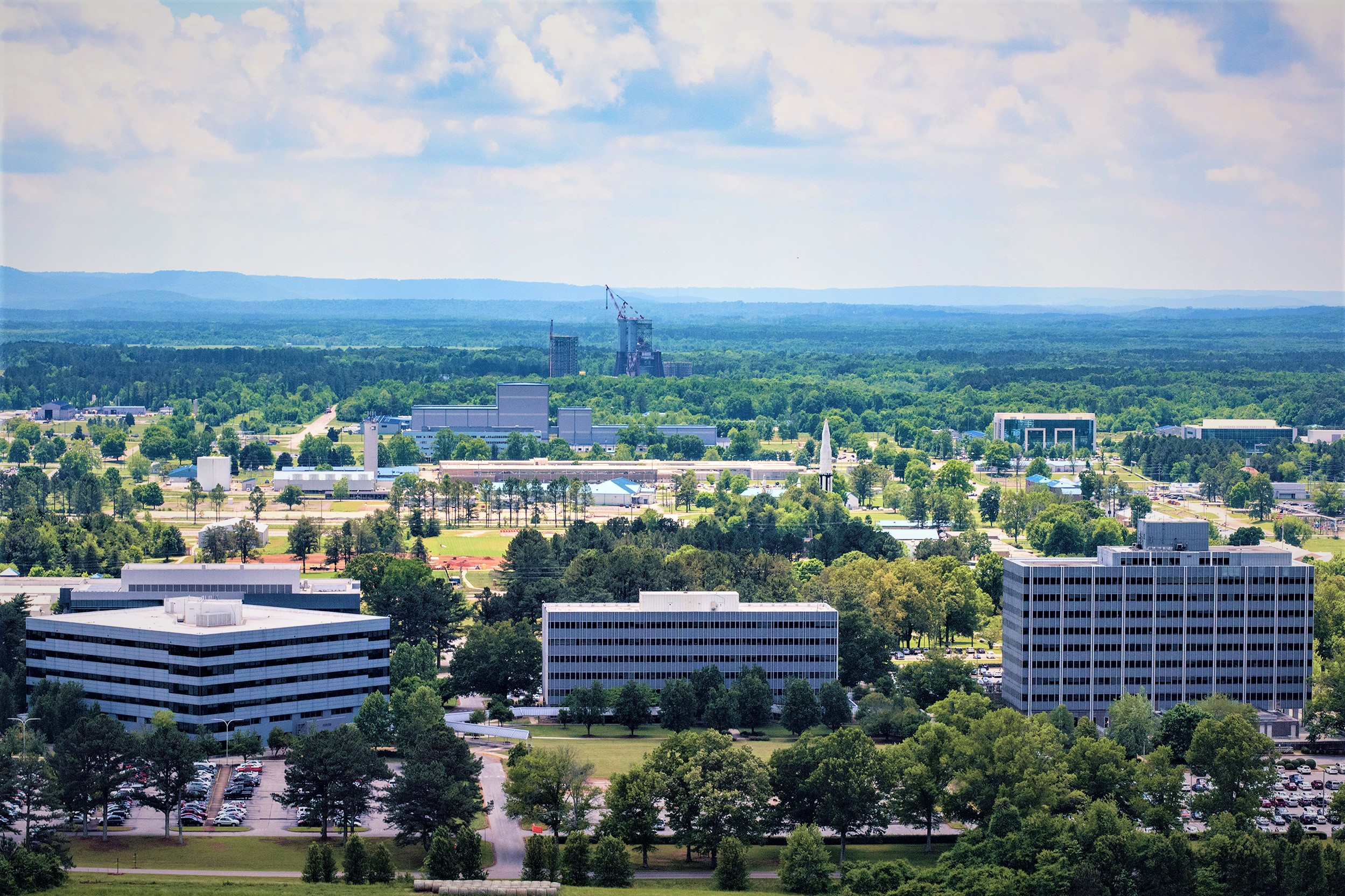
- Aerial view of MSFC in 2016. Note that the buildings in the center of the image and on the right (4202 and 4200) have been demolished.

Agency overview
- Formed: July 1, 1960
- Preceding agency: Redstone Arsenal
- Jurisdiction: U.S. federal government
- Headquarters: Redstone Arsenal, Madison County, Alabama; 34°39′3″N 86°40′22″W
- Employees: 6,000, including 2,300 civil servants
- Annual budget: US$2 billion
- Agency executive: Stephen Cash, director
- Parent agency: NASA
- Website: nasa.gov/marshall

The Marshall Space Flight Center (officially the George C. Marshall Space Flight Center; MSFC), located in Redstone Arsenal, Alabama (Huntsville postal address), is the U.S. government's civilian rocketry and spacecraft propulsion research center. As the largest NASA center, MSFC's first mission was developing the Saturn launch vehicles for the Apollo program. Marshall has been the lead center for the Space Shuttle main propulsion and external tank; payloads and related crew training; International Space Station (ISS) design and assembly; computers, networks, and information management; and the Space Launch System. Located on the Redstone Arsenal near Huntsville, MSFC is named in honor of General of the Army George C. Marshall.

The center contains the Huntsville Operations Support Center (HOSC), also known as the International Space Station Payload Operations Center. This facility supports ISS launch, payload, and experiment activities at the Kennedy Space Center. The HOSC also monitors rocket launches from Cape Canaveral Space Force Station when a Marshall Center payload is on board.

== History ==
MSFC has been NASA's lead center for the development of rocket propulsion systems and technologies. During the 1960s, the activities were largely devoted to the Apollo Program, with the Saturn family of launch vehicles designed and tested at MSFC. MSFC also had a major role in post-Apollo activities, including Skylab, the Space Shuttle, and Spacelab and other experimental activities which made use of the Shuttle's cargo bay.

=== Groundwork ===
After the May 1945 end of World War II in Germany, the US initiated Operation Paperclip to collect a number of scientists and engineers who had been at the center of Nazi Germany's advanced military technologies. In August 1945, 127 missile specialists led by Wernher von Braun signed work contracts with the United States Army Ordnance Corps. Most of them had worked on the V-2 missile development under von Braun at Peenemünde. The missile specialists were sent to Fort Bliss, Texas, joining the Army's newly formed Research and Development Division Sub-office (Rocket).

For the next five years, von Braun and the German scientists and engineers were primarily engaged in adapting and improving the V-2 missile for U.S. applications. Testing was conducted at nearby White Sands Proving Grounds, New Mexico. von Braun was allowed to use a WAC Corporal rocket as a second stage for a V-2; the combination, called Bumper, reached a record-breaking 250 mi (400 km) altitude.

During World War II, the production and storage of ordnance shells was conducted by three arsenals nearby to Huntsville, Alabama. After the war, these were closed, and the three areas were combined to form Redstone Arsenal. In 1949, the Secretary of the Army approved the transfer of the rocket research and development activities from Fort Bliss to the new center at Redstone Arsenal. Beginning in April 1950, about 1,000 persons were involved in the transfer, including von Braun's group. At this time, R&D responsibility for guided missiles was added, and studies began on a medium-range guided missile that eventually became the PGM-11 Redstone.

Over the next decade, missile development at Redstone Arsenal greatly expanded. However, von Braun kept space firmly in his mind, and published a widely read article on this subject. In mid-1952, the Germans were hired as regular civil service employees, with most becoming U.S. citizens in 1954-55. Von Braun was appointed Chief of the Guided Missile Development Division.

In September 1954, von Braun proposed using the Redstone as the main booster of a multi-stage rocket for launching artificial satellites. A year later, a study for Project Orbiter was completed, detailing plans and schedules for a series of scientific satellites. However, the Army's official role in the U.S. space satellite program was delayed after higher authorities elected to use the Vanguard rocket then being developed by the Naval Research Laboratory (NRL).

In February 1956, the Army Ballistic Missile Agency (ABMA) was established. One of the primary programs was a 1,500-mile (2,400 km), single-stage missile that was started the previous year; intended for both the U.S. Army and U.S. Navy, this was designated the PGM-19 Jupiter. Guidance component testing for this Jupiter intermediate range ballistic missile (IRBM) began in March 1956 on a modified Redstone missile dubbed Jupiter A while re-entry vehicle testing began in September 1956 on a Redstone with spin-stabilized upper stages. This ABMA developed Jupiter-C was composed of a Redstone rocket first stage and two upper stages for RV tests or three upper stages for Explorer satellite launches. ABMA had originally planned the 20 September 1956 flight as a satellite launch but, by direct intervention of Eisenhower, was limited to the use of 2 upper stages for an RV test flight traveling 3,350 mi (5,390 km) downrange and attaining an altitude of 682 mi (1,098 km). While the Jupiter-C capability was such that it could have placed the fourth stage in orbit, that mission had been assigned to the NRL. Later Jupiter-C flights would be used to launch satellites. The first Jupiter IRBM flight took place from Cape Canaveral in March 1957 with the first successful flight to full range on 31 May. Jupiter was eventually taken over by the U.S. Air Force.

The Soviet Union launched Sputnik 1, the first artificial Earth orbiting satellite, on October 4, 1957. This was followed on November 3 with the second satellite, Sputnik 2. The United States attempted a satellite launch on December 6 using the NRL's Vanguard rocket, but it barely struggled off the ground, then fell back and exploded. On January 31, 1958, after finally receiving permission to proceed, von Braun and the ABMA space development team used a Jupiter C in a Juno I configuration (addition of a fourth stage) to successfully place Explorer 1, the first US satellite, into orbit around the Earth.

Effective at the end of March 1958, the U.S. Army Ordnance Missile Command (AOMC), encompassing the ABMA and its newly operational space programs. In August, AOMC and Advanced Research Projects Agency (ARPA, a Department of Defense organization) jointly initiated a program managed by ABMA to develop a large space booster of approximately 1.5-million-pounds thrust using a cluster of available rocket engines. In early 1959, this vehicle was designated Saturn.

On April 2, President Dwight D. Eisenhower recommended to Congress that a civilian agency be established to direct nonmilitary space activities. On July 29, the President signed the National Aeronautics and Space Act, forming the National Aeronautics and Space Administration (NASA). NASA incorporated the National Advisory Committee for Aeronautics, Ames Research Center, Langley Research Center, and Lewis Flight Propulsion Laboratory. Despite the existence of an official space agency, the Army continued with far-reaching space programs. In June 1959, a secret study on Project Horizon was completed by ABMA, detailing plans for using the Saturn booster in establishing a crewed Army outpost on the Moon. Project Horizon was rejected, and the Saturn program was transferred to NASA.

Project Mercury was officially named on 26 November 1958. With a future goal of crewed flight, monkeys Able and Miss Baker were the first living creatures recovered from outer space on May 28, 1959. They had been carried in the nose cone on a Jupiter missile to an altitude of 300 mi (480 km) and a distance of 1,500 mi (2,400 km), successfully withstanding 38 times the normal pull of gravity. On October 21, 1959, President Eisenhower approved the transfer of all Army space-related activities to NASA.

=== Redstone Army Arsenal becomes the Marshall Space Flight Center ===
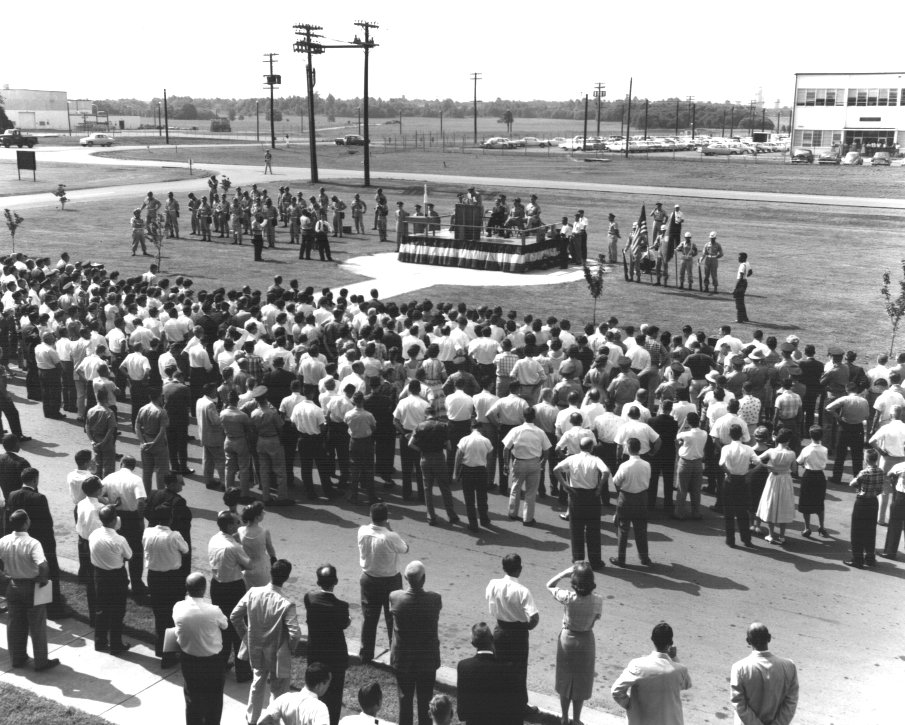
Ceremony of transfer from Army to NASA July 1, 1960

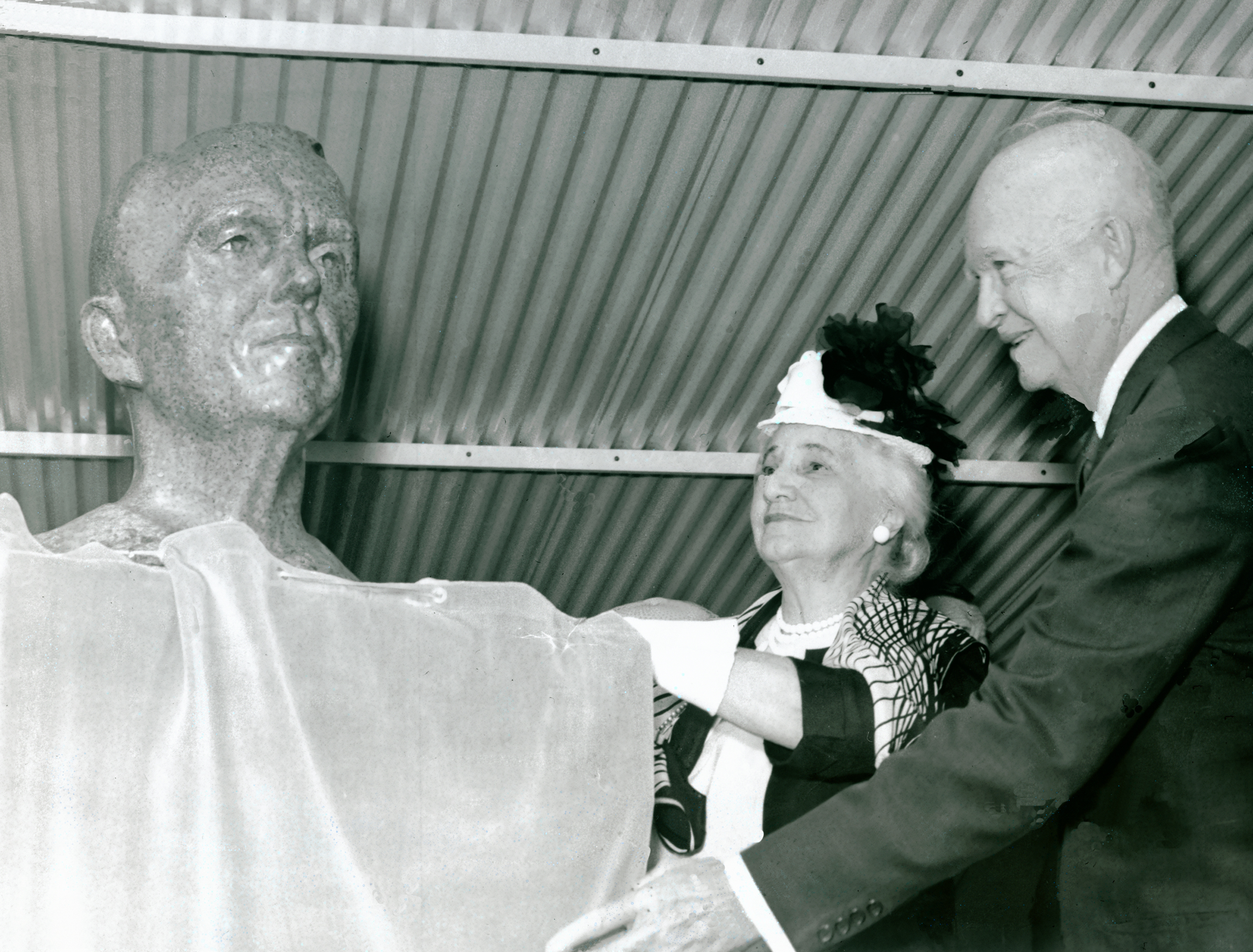
President Eisenhower unveils a bust of George C. Marshall at the space center with help from Marshall's widow, Katherine Tupper Marshall.

On July 1, 1960 the Marshall Space Flight Center, or the MSFC, was created out of the old Redstone Arsenal. The Center was then also placed under the jurisdiction of the recently created NASA, and Wernher von Braun was appointed as the Center's first NASA Director. Eberhart Rees, who was a former associate of von Braun from Germany, was also appointed as von Braun's Deputy for Research and Development.

At the time of the creation of the MSFC, 4,670 civilian employees, about $100 million worth of buildings and equipment, and 1,840 acres (7.4 km^{2}) of land were transferred from AOMC/ABMA to the new MSFC. The official opening date of the MSFC had been July 1, 1960, but its dedication ceremony took place two months later on September 8. At the dedication ceremony President Eisenhower gave a speech. The MSFC was named in honor of General George C. Marshall.

The administrative activities in MSFC were led by persons with backgrounds in traditional U.S. Government functions, but all of the technical heads were individuals who had assisted von Braun in the many successes at the MSFC'S predecessor, the ABMA, where von Braun had been the Technical Director. The initial technical leaders of the new MSFC had all been former colleagues of von Braun starting back in Germany before World War II. These technical department and/ or division heads were as follows:

- Director – Wernher von Braun
- Deputy Director for R&D – Eberhard F. M. Rees
- Reliability Office – H. August Schulze
- Future Projects Office – Heinz-Hermann Koelle
- Light & Medium Vehicles Office – Hans Hueter
- Saturn Systems Office – O. Hermann Lange
- Technical Program Coordination Office – George N. Constan
- Weapons Systems Office – Werner G. Tiller
- Launch Operations Directorate – Kurt H. Debus
- Aeroballistics Division – Ernst G. Geissler. Included the Future Project Branch until that was dissolved in the mid 1960s.
- Computation Division – Helmut Hölzer
- Fabrication & Assembly Engineering Division – Hans H. Maus
- Guidance & Control Division – Walter Häussermann
- Quality Division – Dieter E. Grau
- Research Projects Division – Ernst Stuhlinger
- Structures & Mechanics Division – William A. Mrazek
- Test Division – Karl L. Heimburg

With the exception of Koelle, all of the technical department and/ or division heads had come to the United States under Operation Paperclip after working together at Peenemünde. Von Braun knew well the capabilities of these individuals and had great confidence in them. In the following decade of developing hardware and technical operations that established new levels of complexity, there was never a single failure of their booster designs during crewed flight.

The initial main project at MSFC was the final preparation of a Redstone rocket for Project Mercury to lift a space capsule carrying the first American into space. Originally scheduled to take place in October 1960, this was postponed several time and on May 5, 1961, astronaut Alan Shepard made America's first sub-orbital spaceflight.

By 1965, MSFC had about 7,500 government employees. In addition, most of the prime contractors for launch vehicles and related major items (including North American Aviation, Chrysler, Boeing, Douglas Aircraft, Rocketdyne, and IBM) collectively had approximately a similar number of employees working in MSFC facilities.

Several support contracting firms were also involved in the programs; the largest of these was Brown Engineering Company (BECO, later Teledyne Brown Engineering), the first high-technology firm in Huntsville and by this time having some 3,500 employees. In the Saturn-Apollo activities, BECO/TBE provided about 20-million man-hours of support. Milton K. Cummings was the BECO president, Joseph C. Moquin the executive vice president, William A. Girdini led the engineering design and test work, and Raymond C. Watson, Jr., directed the research and advanced systems activities. Cummings Research Park, the second largest park of this type in the US, was named for Cummings in 1973.

==== Saturn launch vehicles ====
On May 25, 1961, just 20 days after Shepard's flight, President John F. Kennedy committed the US to a lunar landing by the end of the decade. The primary mission of MSFC under the Apollo program was developing the heavy-lift Saturn family rockets. This required the development and qualification of three new liquid-fueled rocket engines, the J-2, F-1, and H-1. Additionally, the existing RL10 was improved for use on the Saturn S-IV stage. Leland F. Belew managed the Engine Development Office. The F-1 engine is the most powerful single-nozzle liquid-fueled rocket engine ever used in service; each produced 1.5-million-pounds thrust. Originally started by the U.S. Air Force, responsibility for the development was taken over by ABMA in 1959, and the first test firings at MSFC were in December 1963.

The original vehicle, designated Saturn I, consisted of two propulsion stages and an instrument unit; it was first tested in flight on October 27, 1961. The first stage (S-I) had a cluster of eight H-1 engines, giving approximately 1.5-million-pounds thrust total. The four outboard engines were gimbaled to allow vehicle steering. The second stage (SIV) had six gimbaled LR10A-3 engines, producing a combined 90-thousand-pounds thrust. Ten Saturn Is were used in flight-testing of Apollo boilerplate units. Five of the test flights also carried important auxiliary scientific experiments.

The Saturn IB (alternatively known as the Uprated Saturn I) also had two propulsion stages and an instrument unit. The first stage (S-IB) also had eight H-1 engines with four gimballed, but the stage had eight fixed fins of equal size fitted to the sides to provide aerodynamic stability. The second stage (S-IVB) had a single J-2 engine that gave a more powerful 230-thousand-pounds thrust. The J-2 was gimbaled and could also be restarted during flight. The vehicle was first flight-tested on February 26, 1966. Fourteen Saturn 1Bs (or partial vehicles) were built, with five used in uncrewed testing and five others used in crewed missions, the last on July 15, 1975.

The Saturn V, an expendable human-rated heavy-lift vehicle, was the most vital element in the Apollo Program. Designed under the direction of Arthur Rudolph, the Saturn V holds the record as the largest and most powerful launch vehicle ever brought to operational status from a combined height, weight, and payload standpoint. The Saturn V consisted of three propulsion stages and an instrument unit. The first stage (S-IC), had five F-1 engines, giving a combined total of 7.5-million-pounds thrust. The S-II second stage had five J-2 engines with a total of 1.0-million-pounds thrust. The third stage (S-IVB) had a single gimballed J-2 engine with 200-thousand-pounds thrust. As previously noted, the J-2 engine could be restarted in flight. The basic configuration for this heavy-lift vehicle was selected in early 1963, and the name Saturn V was applied at that time (configurations that might have led to Saturn II, III, and IV were discarded).

While the three propulsion stages were the "muscle" of the Saturn V, the Instrument Unit (IU) was the "brains." The IU was on a 260-inch (6.6-m) diameter, 36-inch (91-cm) high, ring that was held between the third propulsion stage and the LM. It contained the basic guidance system components – a stable platform, accelerometers, a digital computer, and control electronics – as well as radar, telemetry, and other units. Basically the same IU configuration was used on the Saturn I and IB. With IBM as the prime contractor, the IU was the only full Saturn component manufactured in Huntsville.

The first Saturn V test flight was made on November 9, 1967. On July 16, 1969, as its crowning achievement in the Apollo space program, a Saturn V vehicle lifted the Apollo 11 spacecraft and three astronauts on their journey to the Moon. Other Apollo launches continued through December 6, 1972. The last Saturn V flight was on May 14, 1973, in the Skylab Program (described later). A total of 15 Saturn Vs were built; 13 functioned flawlessly, and the other two remain unused.

==== Fabrication and test facilities ====
Wernher von Braun believed that the personnel designing the space vehicles should have direct, hands-on participation in the building and testing of the hardware. For this, MSFC had facilities where prototypes of every type of Saturn vehicle were fabricated. Large, special-purpose computers were used in the checkout procedures. Static test stands had been constructed at ABMA for the Redstone and Jupiter rockets. In 1961, the Jupiter stand was modified to test Saturn 1 and 1B stages. A number of other test stands followed, the largest being the Saturn V Dynamic Test Stand completed in 1964. At 475 ft (145 m) in height, the entire Saturn V could be accommodated. Also completed in 1964, the S1C Static Test Stand was for live firing of the five F-1 engines of the first stage. Delivering a total of 7.5-million-pounds thrust, the tests produced earthquake-like rumbles throughout the Huntsville area and could be heard as far as 100 mi (160 km) away.

As the Saturn activities progressed, external facilities and factories were needed. In 1961, the Michoud Rocket Factory near New Orleans, Louisiana, was selected as the Saturn V rocket manufacturing site. A 13,500 acres (55 km^{2}) isolated area in Hancock County, Mississippi was selected to conduct Saturn tests. Known as the Mississippi Test Facility (now the John C. Stennis Space Center), this was primarily to test the vehicles built at the New Orleans rocket factory.

==== Early scientific and engineering research ====
From the start, MSFC has had strong research projects in science and engineering. Two of the early activities, Highwater and Pegasus, were performed on a non-interference basis while testing the Saturn I vehicle.

In Project Highwater, a dummy Saturn I second stage was filled with 23,000 US gallons (87 m^{3}) of water as ballast. After burnout of the first stage, explosive charges released the water into the upper atmosphere. The project answered questions about the diffusion of liquid propellants in the event that a rocket was destroyed at high altitude. Highwater experiments were carried out in April and November 1962.

Under the Pegasus Satellite Program, the Saturn I second stage was instrumented to study the frequency and penetration depth of micrometeoroids. Two large panels were folded into the empty stage and unfolded in orbit, presenting 2,300 ft^{2} (210-m^{2}) of instrumented surface. Three Pegasus satellites were launched during 1965, with each one staying in orbit from 3 to 13 years.

===== Lunar exploration =====
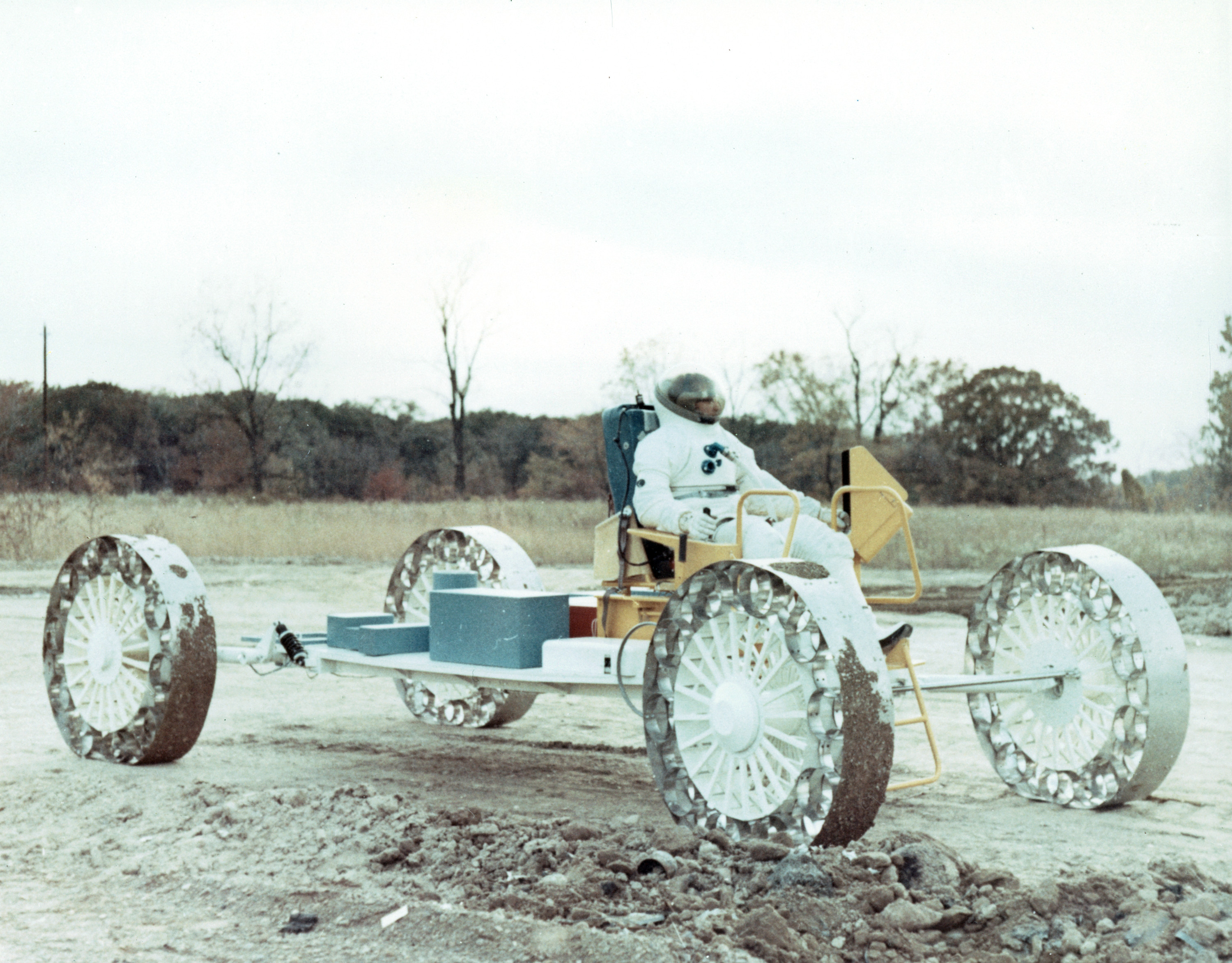
Lunar Roving Vehicle test article on test track

There were six Apollo missions that landed on the Moon: Apollo 11, 12, 14, 15, 16, and 17. Apollo 13 had been intended as a landing, but only circled the Moon and returned to Earth after an oxygen tank ruptured and crippled power in the CSM. Except for Apollo 11, all of the missions carried an Apollo Lunar Surface Experiments Package (ALSEP), composed of equipment for seven scientific experiments plus a central remote control station with a radioisotope thermoelectric generator (RTG). Scientists from MSFC were among the co-investigators.

The Lunar Roving Vehicle (LRV), popularly known as the "Moon Buggy," was developed at MSFC to provide transportation for exploring a limited amount of the Moon's surface. Not intended in the original planning, by 1969 it became clear that an LRV would be needed to maximize the scientific returns. An LRV was carried on the last three missions, allowing an area similar in size to Manhattan Island to be explored. Outbound they carried an ALSEP to be set up; on the return trip, they carried more than 200 pounds of lunar rock and soil samples. Saverio "Sonny" Morea was the LRV project manager at MSFC.

===== Skylab and ATM =====
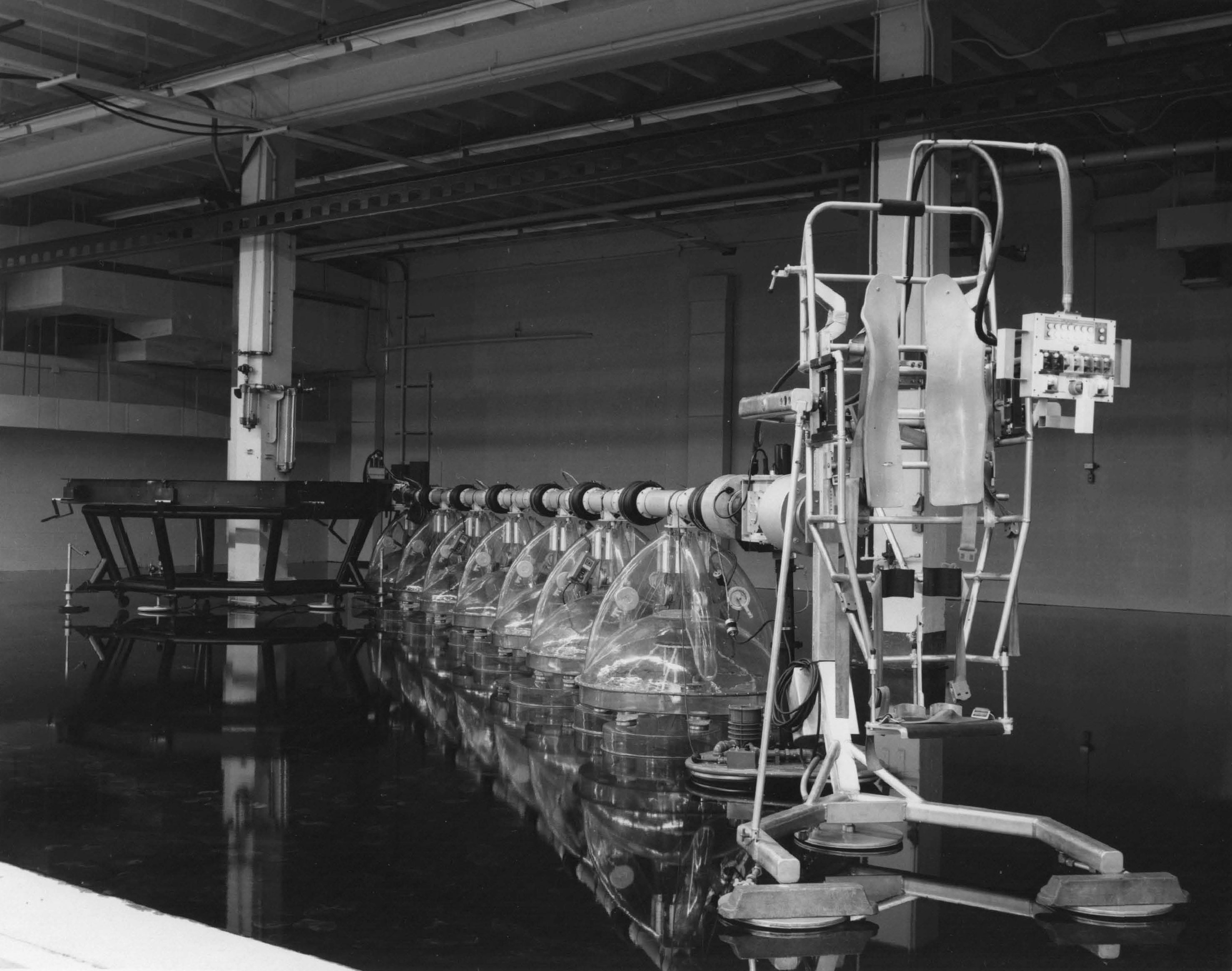
MSFC engineers tested this articulated arm developed, but not used, for Skylab at a MSFC flat floor facility.

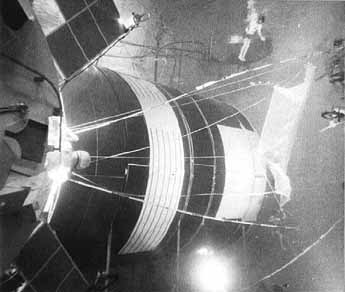
MSFC used the Neutral Buoyancy Facility to test Skylab procedures. Here, engineers are testing procedures for repairing Skylab.

The Apollo Applications Program (AAP) involved science-based crewed space missions using surplus Apollo equipment. The lack of interest by Congress resulted in most of the proposed activities being abandoned, but an orbital workshop remained of interest. In December 1965, MSFC was authorized to begin the Orbital Workshop as a formal project. At a meeting at MSFC on August 19, 1966, George E. Mueller, NASA Associate Administrator for Manned Space Flight, pinned down the final concept for the major elements. MSFC was assigned responsibility for the development of the orbiting space station hardware as well as overall systems engineering and integration.

For testing and mission simulation, a 75-foot (23 m)-diameter water-filled tank, the Neutral Buoyancy Facility, was opened at MSFC in March 1968. Engineers and astronauts used this underwater facility to simulate the weightlessness (or zero-g) environment of space. This was particularly used in training astronauts in activities in zero-g work, especially spacewalks.

The Orbital Workshop was built into the propellant tanks of a Saturn V third stage, being fully refitted on the ground. It was renamed Skylab in February 1970. Two were built – one for flight and the other for testing and mission simulation in the Neutral Buoyancy Facility. Leland F Belew served for eight years as the overall Skylab program director.

Another AAP project that survived was a solar observatory, originally intended to be a deployable attachment to the Apollo spacecraft. Called the Apollo Telescope Mount (ATM), the project was assigned to MSFC in 1966. As the Orbital Workshop matured into the Skylab, the ATM was added as an appendage, but the two activities were kept as independent development projects. Rein Ise was the ATM project manager at MSFC. The ATM included eight major instruments for observations of the Sun at wavelengths from extreme ultraviolet to infrared. The data was mainly collected on special photographic film; during the Skylab missions, the film had to be changed out by astronauts in spacewalks.

On May 14, 1973, the 77-ton (70,000-kg) Skylab was launched into a 235-nautical-mile (435-km) orbit by the last flown Saturn V. Saturn IB vehicles with their CSMs were used to launch three-person crews to dock with Skylab. Severe damage was sustained during Skylab launch and deployment, resulting in the loss of the station's micrometeoroid shield/sun shade and one of its main solar panels. This loss was partially corrected by the first crew, launched May 25; they stayed in orbit with Skylab for 28 days. Two additional missions followed with the launch dates of July 28 and November 16, with mission durations of 59 and 84 days, respectively. Skylab, including the ATM, logged about 2,000 hours on some 300 scientific and medical experiments. The last Skylab crew returned to the Earth on February 8, 1974.

===== Apollo–Soyuz Test Program =====
The Apollo–Soyuz Test Project (ASTP) was the last flight of a Saturn IB. On 15 July 1975, a three-person crew was launched on a six-day mission to dock with a Soviet Soyuz spacecraft. The primary purpose was to provide engineering experience for future joint space flights, but both spacecraft also had scientific experiments. This was the last crewed U.S. space mission until April 1981.

==== Post-Apollo science ====
The High Energy Astronomy Observatory (HEAO) Program involved three missions of large spacecraft in low Earth orbit. Each spacecraft was about 18 ft (5.5 m) in length, massed between 6,000 and 7,000 lb (2,700 and 3,200 kg), and carried some 3,000 lb (1,400 kg) of experiments for X-ray and gamma-ray astronomy and cosmic-ray investigations. The project provided insights into celestial objects by studying their high-energy radiation from space. Scientists from across the US served as principal investigators.

The HEAO spacecraft concept originated in the late 1960s, but funding did not become available for some time. Using Atlas-Centaur launch vehicles, three highly successful missions were flown: HEAO 1 in August 1977, HEAO 2 (also called the Einstein Observatory) in November 1978, and HEAO 3 in September 1979. Fred A. Speer was the HEAO project manager for MSFC.

Other MSFC-managed space science projects in the 1970s included the Laser Geodynamics Satellite (LAGEOS) and Gravity Probe A. In LAGEOS, laser beams from 35 ground stations are reflected by 422 prismatic mirrors on the satellite to track movements in the Earth's crust. The measurement accuracy is a few centimeters and it tracks the movement of tectonic plates with comparable accuracy. Conceived and built at MSFC, the LAGEOS was launched by a Delta rocket in May 1976.

Gravity Probe A, also called the Redshift Experiment, used an extremely precise hydrogen maser clock to confirm part of Einstein's general theory of relativity. The probe was launched in June 1976, by a Scout rocket, and remained in space for near two hours, as intended.

==== Space Shuttle development ====
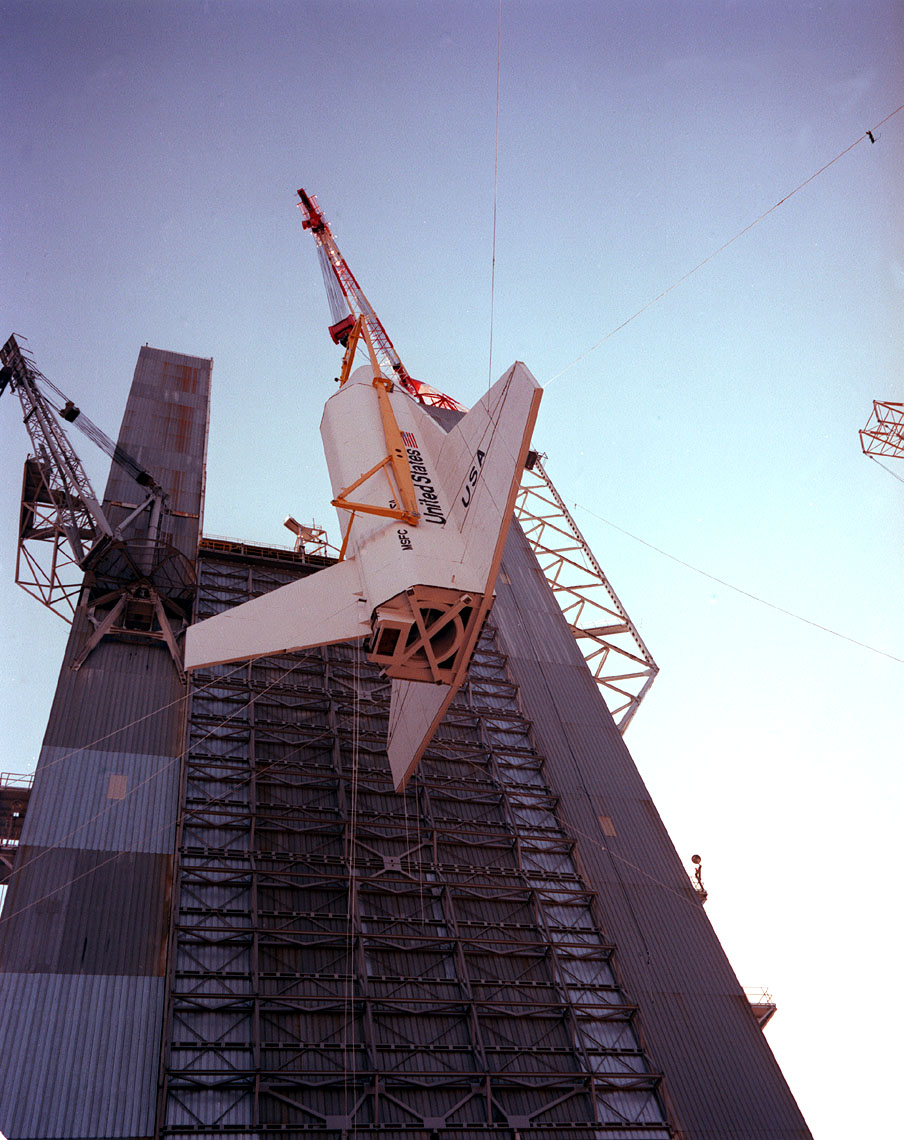
A crane hoists the Facilities Test Article, a mockup of an actual shuttle orbiter, into the Saturn V Dynamic Test Stand at MSFC to test the procedures in preparation for the dynamic test of Space Shuttle Enterprise.

On January 5, 1972, President Richard M. Nixon announced plans to develop the Space Shuttle, a reusable Space Transportation System (STS) for routine access to space. The Shuttle was composed of the Orbiter Vehicle (OV) containing the crew and payload, two Solid Rocket Boosters (SRBs), and the External Tank (ET) that carried liquid fuel for the OV's main engines. MSFC was responsible for the SRBs, the OV's three main engines, and the ET. MSFC was also responsible for the integration of Spacelab, a versatile laboratory developed by the European Space Agency and carried in the Shuttle's cargo bay on some flights.

The first test firing of an OV main engine was in 1975. Two years later, the first firing of a SRB took place and tests on the ET began at MSFC. The first Enterprise OV flight, attached to a Shuttle Carrier Aircraft (SCA), was in February 1977; this was followed by free landings in August and October. In March 1978, the Enterprise OV was flown atop a SCA to MSFC. Mated to an ET, the partial Space Shuttle was hoisted onto the modified Saturn V Dynamic Test Stand where it was subjected to a full range of vibrations comparable to those in a launch. The first spaceworthy Space Shuttle, Columbia, was completed and placed at the KSC for checking and launch preparation. On April 12, 1981, the Columbia made the first orbital test flight.

=== 1980s and 1990s – early Shuttle era ===
The Space Shuttle was the most complex spacecraft ever built. From the start of the Shuttle program in 1972, the management and development of Space Shuttle propulsion was a major activity at MSFC. Alex A. McCool, Jr. was the first manager of MSFC's Space Shuttle Projects Office.

Throughout 1980, engineers at MSFC participated in tests related to plans to launch the first Space Shuttle. During these early tests and prior to each later Shuttle launch, personnel in the Huntsville Operations Support Center monitored consoles to evaluate and help solve any problems at the Florida launch that might involve Shuttle propulsion.

On April 12, 1981, Columbia made the first orbital test flight with a crew of two astronauts. This was designated STS-1 (Space Transportation System-1) and verified the combined performance of the entire system. STS-1 was followed by STS-2 on November 12, demonstrating safe re-launch of Columbia. During 1982, STS-3 and STS-4 were completed. STS-5, launched November 11, was the first operational mission; carrying four astronauts, two commercial satellite were deployed. In all three of these flights, on-board experiments were carried and conducted on pallets in the Shuttle's cargo bay.

Space Shuttle Challenger was launched on mission STS-51-L on 28 January 1986, resulting in the Space Shuttle Challenger disaster one minute and thirteen seconds into the flight. Subsequent analysis of the high-speed tracking films and telemetry signals showed that a leak occurred in a joint on one of the solid rocket boosters (SRBs). The escaping flame impinged on the surface of the external tank (ET), resulting in the destruction of the vehicle and loss of the crew. The basic cause of the disaster was determined to be an O-ring failure in the right SRB; cold weather was a contributing factor. A redesign and extensive testing of the SRBs was conducted. There were no Space Shuttle missions in the remainder of 1986 or in 1987. Flights resumed in September 1988 with STS-26.

==== Shuttle missions and payloads ====
The Space Shuttles carried a wide variety of payloads, from scientific research equipment to highly classified military satellites. The flights were assigned a Space Transportation System (STS) number, in general sequenced by the planned launch date. The list of space shuttle missions shows all flights, their missions, and other information.

MSFC managed the adaptation of the Inertial Upper Stage. This solid rocket was first flown in May 1989, propelling the Magellan planetary spacecraft from Orbiter Atlantis on a 15-month loop around the Sun and eventually into orbit around Venus for four years of radar surface-mapping.

Many Shuttle flights carried equipment for performing on-board research. Such equipment was accommodated in two forms: on pallets or other arrangements in the Shuttle's cargo bay (most often in addition to hardware for the primary mission). The integration of these experimental payloads was the responsibility of MSFC.

Pallet experiments were of a variety of types and complexity, including fluid physics, materials science, biotechnology, combustion science, and commercial space processing. For some missions, an aluminum bridge fitting across the cargo bay was used. This could carry 12 standard canisters holding isolated experiments, particularly those under the Getaway Special (GAS) program. GAS flights were made available at low cost to colleges, universities, US companies, individuals, foreign governments, and others.

On some flights, a variety of pallet experiments constituted the full payload, with examples including Astronomy Laboratory-1 (ASTRO-1) and Atmospheric Laboratory for Applications and Science (ATLAS 1).

==== Spacelab ====
In addition to the pallet experiments flown on the Space Shuttle, many other experiments were performed onboard Spacelab. This was a reusable laboratory consisting of multiple components, including a pressurized module, an unpressurized carrier, and other related hardware. Under a program overseen by MSFC, ten Europeans nations jointly designed, built, and financed the first Spacelab through the European Space Research Organisation (ESRO. In addition, Japan funded a Spacelab for STS-47, a dedicated mission.

Over a 15-year period, Spacelab components flew on 22 shuttle missions, the last in April 1998. Examples of Spacelab missions follow:

- Spacelab 1 was flown on STS-9, launched November 28, 1983. A Shuttle Columbia flight, this was the first with six astronauts, including two Payload Specialists from the ESRO. There were 73 experiments carried out in astronomy and physics, atmospheric physics, Earth observations, life sciences, materials sciences, and space plasma physics.
- U.S. Microgravity Laboratory 1 (USML-1) was launched in June 1992 on STS-50, the first Extended Duration Orbiter. During 14 days, 31 microgravity experiments were completed in round-the-clock operations. USML-2 was launched in October 1995 on STS-73 with an MSFC scientist, Frederick W. Leslie, as an on-board Payload Specialist.

In early 1990, MSFC's Spacelab Mission Operations Control Center was formed to control all Spacelab missions, replacing the Payload Operations Control Center formerly situated at the JSC from which previous Spacelab missions were operated.

==== International Space Station ====
NASA began planning to build a space station in 1984, named Freedom in 1988. By the early 1990s, planning for four different stations were underway: the American Freedom, the Soviet/Russian Mir-2, the European Columbus, and the Japanese Kibō. In November 1993, plans for Freedom, Mir-2, and the European and Japanese modules were incorporated into a single International Space Station (ISS). The ISS is composed of modules assembled in orbit, starting with the Russian module Zarya in November 1998. This was followed in December by the first U.S. module, Unity also called Node 1, built by Boeing in facilities at MSFC.

ISS assembly continued throughout the next decade, with continuously occupancy since February 7, 2001. Since 1998, 18 major U.S. components on the ISS have been assembled in space. In October 2007, Harmony or Node 2, was attached to Destiny; also managed by MSFC, this gave connection hubs for European and Japanese modules as well as additional living space, allowing the ISS crew to increase to six. The 18th and final major U.S. and Boeing-built element, the Starboard 6 Truss Segment, was delivered to the ISS in February 2009. With this, the full set of solar arrays could be activated, increasing the power available for science projects to 30 kW. That marked the completion of the United States Orbital Segment (USOS) of the station. On 5 March 2010, Boeing officially turned over the USOS to NASA.

==== Hubble Space Telescope ====
In 1962, the first Orbiting Solar Observatory was launched, followed by the Orbiting Astronomical Observatory (OAO) that carried out ultraviolet observations of stars between 1968 and 1972. These showed the value of space-based astronomy, and led to the planning of the Large Space Telescope (LST) that would be launched and maintained from the forthcoming space shuttle. Budget limitations almost killed the LST, but the astronomy community – especially Lyman Spitzer – and the National Science Foundation pressed for a major program in this area. Congress finally funded LST in 1978, with an intended launch date of 1983.

MSFC was given responsibility for the design, development, and construction of the telescope, while Goddard Space Flight Center (GFC) was to develop the scientific instruments and ground-control center. The project scientist was C. Robert O’Dell, then chairman of the Astronomy Department at the University of Chicago. The telescope assembly was designed as a Cassegrain reflector with hyperbolic mirror polished to be diffraction limited; the primary mirror had a diameter of 2.4 m (94 in). The mirrors were developed by the optics firm Perkin-Elmer. MSFC could not test the performance of the mirror assembly until the telescope was launched and placed in service.

The LST was named the Hubble Space Telescope in 1983, the original launch date. There were many problems, delays, and cost increases in the program, and the Challenger disaster delayed the availability of the launch vehicle. The Hubble Space Telescope was launched in April 1990, but gave flawed images due to a flawed primary mirror that had spherical aberration. The defect was found when the telescope was in orbit. Fortunately, the Hubble telescope had been designed to allow in-space maintenance, and in December 1993, mission STS-61 carried astronauts to the Hubble to make corrections and change some components. A second repair mission, STS-82, was made in February 1997, and a third, STS-103, in December 1999. Another servicing mission (STS-109) was flown on 1 March 2002. For these repair missions, the astronauts practiced the work in MSFC's Neutral Buoyancy Facility, simulating the weightless environment of space.

Based on the success of earlier maintenance missions, NASA decided to have a fifth service mission to Hubble; this was STS-125 flown on May 11, 2009. The maintenance and addition of equipment resulted in Hubble performance considerably better than planned at its origin. It is now expected that the Hubble will remain operational until its successor, the James Webb Space Telescope (JWST), is available in 2018.

==== Chandra X-Ray Observatory ====
Even before HEAO-2 (the Einstein Observatory) was launched in 1978, MSFC began preliminary studies for a larger X-ray telescope. To support this effort, in 1976 an X-Ray Test Facility, the only one of its size, was constructed at MSFC for verification testing and calibration of X-ray mirrors, telescope systems, and instruments. With the success of HEAO-2, MSFC was given responsibility for the design, development, and construction of what was then known as the Advanced X-ray Astrophysics Facility (AXAF). The Smithsonian Astrophysical Observatory (SAO) partners with MSFC, providing the science and operational management.

Work on the AXAF continued through the 1980s. A major review was held in 1992, resulting in many changes; four of the twelve planned mirrors were eliminated, as were two of the six scientific instruments. The planned circular orbit was changed to an elliptical one, reaching one-third of the way to the Moon at its farthest point; this eliminated the possibility of improvement or repair using the Space Shuttle, but it placed the spacecraft above the Earth's radiation belts for most of its orbit.

AXAF was renamed Chandra X-ray Observatory in 1998. It was launched July 23, 1999, by the Shuttle Columbia (STS-93). An Inertial Upper Stage booster adapted by MSFC was used to transport Chandra to its high orbit Weighing about 22,700 kg (50,000 lb), this was the heaviest payload ever launched by a Shuttle. Operationally managed by the SAO, ‘’Chandra’’ has been returning excellent data since being activated. It initially had an expected life of five years, but this has now been extended to 15 years or longer.

The Chandra X-ray Observatory, originating at MSFC, was launched on July 3, 1999, and is operated by the Smithsonian Astrophysical Observatory. With an angular resolution of 0.5 arcsecond (2.4 μrad), it has a thousand times better resolution than the first orbiting X-ray telescopes. Its highly elliptical orbit allows continuous observations up to 85 percent of its 65-hour orbital period. With its ability to make X-ray images of star clusters, supernova remnants, galactic eruptions, and collisions between clusters of galaxies - in its first decade of operation it has transformed astronomer's view of the high-energy universe.

==== Compton Gamma Ray Observatory ====
The Compton Gamma Ray Observatory (CGRO) was another of NASA's Great Observatories. The CGRO was launched April 5, 1991, on Shuttle flight STS-37. At 37,000 lb (17,000 kg), it was the heaviest astrophysical payload ever flown at that time. CGRO was 14 years in development by NASA; TRW was the builder. Gamma radiation is the highest energy-level of electromagnetic radiation, having energies above 100 keV and frequencies above 10 exahertz (10^{19} Hz). Gamma radiation is produced by sub-atomic particle interactions, including those in some astrophysical processes. The continuous flow of cosmic rays bombarding space objects, such as the Moon, generate this radiation. Gamma rays also result in bursts from nuclear reactions. The CGRO was designed to image continuous radiation and to detect bursts.

MSFC was responsible for the Burst and Transient Source Experiment, (BATSE). This triggered on sudden changes in gamma count-rates lasting 0.1 to 100 s; it was also capable of detecting less impulsive sources by measuring their modulation using the Earth occultation technique. In nine years of operation, BATSE triggered about 8000 events, of which some 2700 were strong bursts that were analyzed to have come from distant galaxies.

Unlike the Hubble Space Telescope, the CGRO was not designed for on-orbit repair and refurbishment. Thus, after one of its gyroscopes failed, NASA decided that a controlled crash was preferable to letting the craft come down on its own at random. On June 4, 2000, it was intentionally de-orbited, with the debris that did not burn up falling harmlessly into the Pacific Ocean. At MSFC, Gerald J. Fishman is the principal investigator of a project to continue examination of data from BATSE and other gamma-ray projects. The 2011 Shaw Prize was shared by Fishman and Italian Enrico Costa for their gamma-ray research.

=== 2000s and 2010s - late Shuttle and successors ===
MSFC is NASA's designated developer and integrator of launch systems. The state-of-the-art Propulsion Research Laboratory serves as a leading national resource for advanced space propulsion research. Marshall has the engineering capabilities to take space vehicles from initial concept to sustained service. For manufacturing, the world's largest-known welding machine of its type was installed at MSFC in 2008; it is capable of building major, defect-free components for human-rated space vehicles.

In early March 2011, NASA Headquarters announced that MSFC will lead the efforts on a new heavy-lift rocket that, like the Saturn V of the lunar exploration program of the late 1960s, will carry large, human-rated payloads beyond low-Earth orbit. MSFC has the program office for the Space Launch System.

==== Orbital Space Plane ====
The initial plans for the Space Station envisaged a small, low-cost Crew Return Vehicle (CRV) that would provide emergency evacuation capability. The 1986 Challenger disaster led planners to consider a more capable spacecraft. The Orbital Space Plane (OSP) development got underway in 2001, with an early version then expected to enter service by 2010. In 2004, the knowledge gained on the OSP was transferred to Johnson Space Center (JSC) for use in the development of the Crew Exploration Vehicle of the Constellation program. No operational OSP was ever built.

==== Columbia disaster and Shuttle retirement ====
MSFC had responsibility for the Space Shuttle's rocket propulsion elements, including the External Tank. On February 1, 2003, the Space Shuttle Columbia disaster was caused by a piece of insulation that broke off the external tank during launch and damaged the thermal protection on the Orbiter's left wing.

MSFC was responsible for the external tank, but few or no changes to the tank were made; rather, NASA decided that it was inevitable that some insulation might be lost during launch and thus required that an inspection of the orbiter's critical elements be made prior to reentry on future flights.

NASA retired the Space Shuttle in 2011, which left the US dependent upon the Russian Soyuz spacecraft for crewed space missions for the next nine years until Demo-2 in 2020.

==== Constellation Program ====
Between 2004 and early 2010, the Constellation Program was a major NASA activity. MSFC was responsible for the propulsion of the proposed Ares I and Ares V heavy-lift vehicles.

Starting in 2006, the MSFC Exploration Launch Projects Office began work on the Ares projects. On October 28, 2009, an Ares I-X test rocket lifted off from the newly modified Launch Complex 39B at Kennedy Space Center (KSC) for a two-minute powered flight; then continued for four additional minutes traveling 150 mi (240 km) down range.

==== Deep-space astronomy ====
The Fermi Gamma-ray Space Telescope, initially called the Gamma-Ray Large Area Space Telescope (GLAST), is an international, multi-agency space observatory used to study the cosmos. It was launched June 11, 2008, has a design life of 5 years and a goal of 10 years. The primary instrument is the Large Area Telescope (LAT), which is sensitive in the photon energy range of 0.1 to greater than 300 GeV and can view about 20% of the sky at any given moment. The LAT is complemented by the GLAST Burst Monitor (GBM) which can detect burst of X-rays and gamma rays in the 8-keV to 3-MeV energy range, overlapping with the LAT. The GBM is a collaborative effort between the U.S. National Space Science and Technology Center and the Max Planck Institute for Extraterrestrial Physics in Germany. MSFC manages the GBM, and Charles A. Meegan of MSFC is the Principal Investigator. Many new discoveries have been made in the initial period of operation. For example, on May 10, 2009, a burst was detected that, by its propagation characteristics, is believed to negate some approaches to a new theory of gravity.

The Burst and Transient Source Experiment (BATSE), with Gerald J. Fishman of MSFC serving as Principal Investigator, is an ongoing examination of the many years of data from gamma-ray bursts, pulsars, and other transient gamma-ray phenomena. The 2011 Shaw Prize, often called "Asia's Nobel Prize," was shared by Fishman and Italian astronomer Enrico Costa for their gamma-ray research.

== Present and future – 2010s onward ==
Marshall Space Flight Center has capabilities and projects supporting NASA's mission in three key areas: lifting from Earth (Space Vehicles), living and working in space (International Space Station), and understanding our world and beyond (Advanced Scientific Research).

=== International Space Station ===
The International Space Station is a partnership of the United States, Russian, European, Japanese, and Canadian Space Agencies. The station has continuously had human occupants since November 2, 2000. Orbiting 16 times daily at an average altitude of about 250 mi (400 km), it passes over some 90 percent of the world's surface. It has a mass over 932,000 lb (423,000 kg), and a crew of six conducts research and prepares the way for future explorations.

It is planned that the International Space Station will be operated at least through the end of 2030. Following the retirement of the Space Shuttle Program in 2011, crewed NASA missions to the ISS were supported by Russian Soyuz spacecraft until 2020 when NASA’s Commercial Crew Program became operational with regular launches of SpaceX Crew Dragon spacecraft atop SpaceX Falcon 9 reusable rockets https://spacenews.com/nasa-and-spacex-finalize-extension-of-commercial-crew-contract/. Boeing’s CST-100 Starliner Commercial Crew spacecraft will join upon completion of NASA’s mandated test protocols https://www.space.com/41360-how-boeing-starliner-commercial-spacecraft-works.html.

MSFC has supported activities in the U.S. Laboratory (Destiny) and elsewhere on the International Space Station through the Payload Operations Center (POC). The research activities include experiments on topics ranging from human physiology to physical science. Operating around the clock, scientists, engineers, and flight controllers in the POC link Earth-bound researchers throughout the world with their experiments and astronauts aboard the ISS. As of March 2011, this has included the coordination of more than 1,100 experiments conducted by 41 space-station crew members involved in over 6,000 hours of science research.

=== Advanced scientific research ===
Hundreds of experiments have been conducted aboard the International Space Station. The deep-space images from the Hubble Space Telescope and the Chandra X-ray Observatory are made possible in part by the people and facilities at Marshall. The MSFC was not only responsible for the design, development, and construction of these telescopes, but it is also now home to the only facility in the world for testing large telescope mirrors in a space-simulated environment. Work has been completed on the James Webb Space Telescope (JWST), which is now making observations using the largest primary mirror ever assembled in space. In the future, the facility will likely be used for another successor, the Advanced Technology Large-Aperture Space Telescope (AT-LAST).

The National Space Science and Technology Center (NSSTC) is a joint research venture between NASA and the seven research universities of the State of Alabama. The primary purpose of NSSTC is to foster collaboration in research between government, academia, and industry. It consists of seven research centers: Advanced Optics, Biotechnology, Global Hydrology & Climate, Information Technology, Material Science, Propulsion, and Space Science. Each center is managed by either MSFC, the host NASA facility, or the University of Alabama in Huntsville, the host university.

==== Solar System research ====
Teams at MSFC manage NASA's programs for exploring the Sun, the Moon, the planets, and other bodies throughout the Solar System. These have included Gravity Probe B, an experiment to test two predictions of Einstein's general theory of relativity, and Solar-B, an international mission to study the solar magnetic field and origins of the solar wind, a phenomenon that affects radio transmission on the Earth. The MSFC Lunar Precursor and Robotic Program Office manages projects and directs studies on lunar robotic activities across NASA.

==== Climate and weather research ====
MSFC also develops systems for monitoring the Earth's climate and weather patterns. At the Global Hydrology and Climate Center (GHCC), researchers combine data from Earth systems with satellite data to monitor biodiversity conservation and climate change, providing information that improves agriculture, urban planning, and water-resource management.

==== Microsatellites ====
On November 19, 2010, MSFC entered the new field of microsatellites with the successful launch of FASTSAT (Fast, Affordable, Science and Technology Satellite). Part of a joint DoD/NASA payload, it was launched by a Minotaur IV rocket from the Kodiak Launch Complex on Kodiak Island, Alaska. FASTSAT is a platform carrying multiple small payloads to low-Earth orbit, creating opportunities to conduct low-cost scientific and technology research on an autonomous satellite in space. FASTSAT, weighing just under 400 lb (180 kg), serves as a full scientific laboratory containing all the resources needed to carry out scientific and technology research operations. It was developed at the MSFC in partnership with the Von Braun Center for Science & Innovation and Dynetics, Inc., both of Huntsville, Alabama. Mark Boudreaux is the project manager for MSFC.

There are six experiments on the FASTSAT bus, including NanoSail-D2, which is itself a nanosatellite – the first satellite launched from another satellite. It was deployed satisfactorily on January 21, 2011.

== List of center directors ==
The following persons had served as the Marshall Space Flight Center director:

No.	Image	Director	Start	End	Refs.
1		Wernher von Braun	July 1, 1960	January 27, 1970	
2		Eberhard F. M. Rees	March 1, 1970	January 19, 1973	
3		Rocco A. Petrone	January 26, 1973	March 15, 1974	
4		William R. Lucas	June 15, 1974	July 3, 1986	
5		James R. Thompson Jr.	September 29, 1986	July 6, 1989	
6		Thomas J. Lee	July 6, 1989	January 6, 1994	
7		Gene Porter Bridwell	January 6, 1994	February 3, 1996	
8		J. Wayne Littles	February 3, 1996	January 1998	
Acting		Carolyn S. Griner	January 1998	September 1998	
9		Arthur G. Stephenson	September 1998	May, 2003	
10		David A. King	June 15, 2003	March 26, 2009	
Acting		Robert M. Lightfoot, Jr.	March 26, 2009	July 2009	
11		Robert M. Lightfoot, Jr.	August 2009	March 4, 2012	
Acting		Arthur E. Goldman	March 5, 2012	August 3, 2012	
Acting		Robin Henderson	August 4, 2012	September 24, 2012	
12		Patrick Scheuermann	September 25, 2012	November 13, 2015	
Acting		Todd May	November 14, 2015	January 31, 2016	
13		Todd May	February 1, 2016	July 27, 2018	
Acting		Jody Singer	July 27, 2018	September 12, 2018	
14		Jody Singer	September 13, 2018	July 29, 2023	
Acting		Joseph Pelfrey	July 29, 2023	February 5, 2024	
15		Joseph Pelfrey	February 5, 2024	September 24, 2025	
Acting		Rae Ann Meyer	September 25, 2025	October 18, 2026	
16		Stephen Cash	October 19, 2026	present	

== See also ==
- US Space and Rocket Center
- Redstone Arsenal
- Test Stand 4670
