= Patrick Scheuermann =

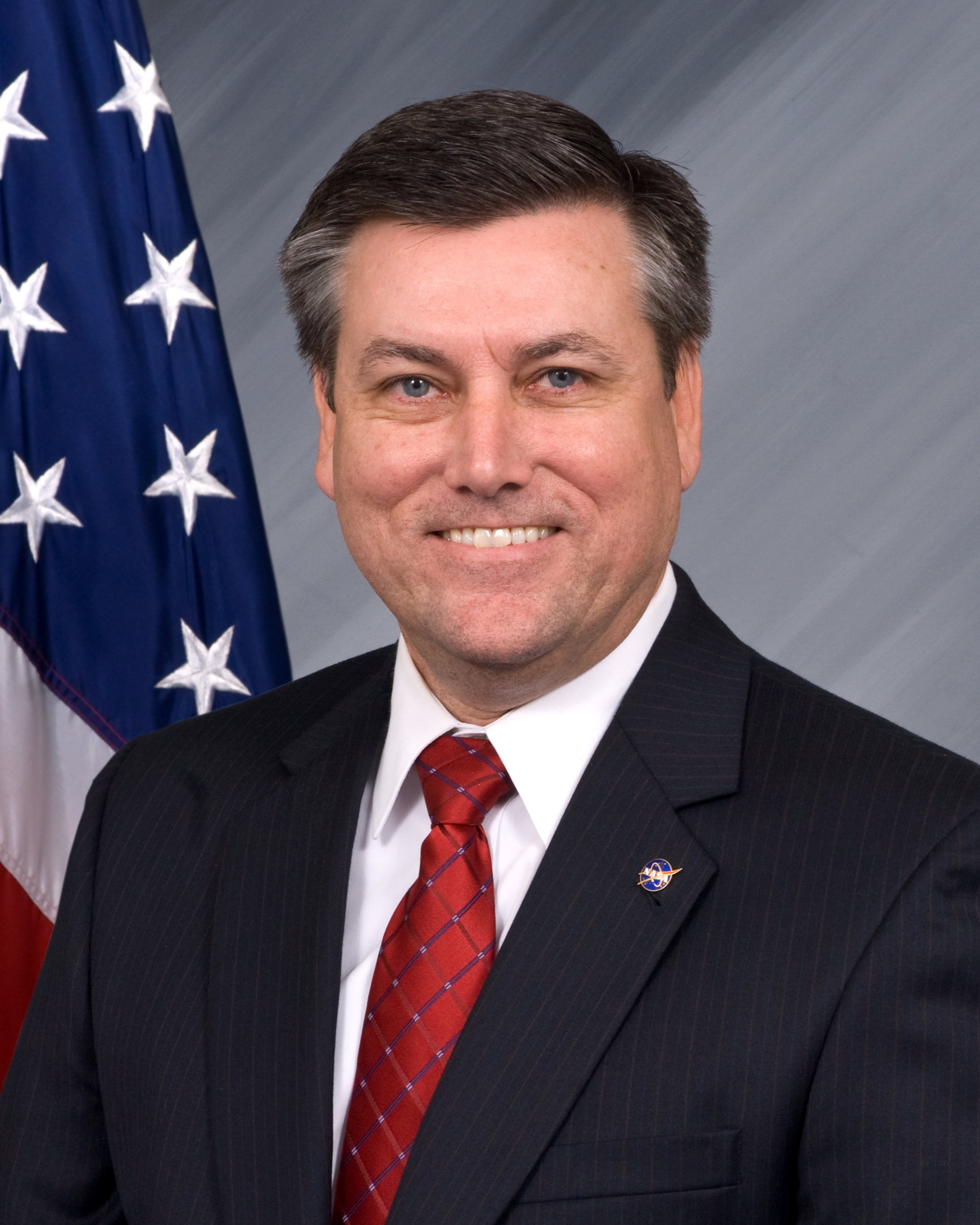
- Official NASA portrait
- Born: New Orleans, Louisiana
- Education: University of New Orleans
- Occupation: NASA administrator
- Title: Director of the Marshall Space Flight Center
- Website: Marshall Leadership

Patrick Scheuermann (pronounced "Sherman") is the former Director of the NASA Marshall Space Flight Center located in Huntsville, Alabama. He was named to become the center's twelfth director on September 25, 2012, and served in the role until November 13, 2015. Scheuermann succeeded Robin Henderson, who had served as acting director for the preceding two months. Scheuermann served as the director of the John C. Stennis Space Center near Bay St. Louis, Mississippi from March 2010 until his appointment to Marshall. Earlier in his NASA career, he served as legislative fellow to Senate Majority Leader Trent Lott.
