= Enrico Costa (physicist) =

Italian astrophysicist

Enrico Costa (born 1944 in Sassari, Sardinia) is an Italian astrophysicist, known for studies of gamma ray bursts (GRBs).

Costa's family moved in 1954 to Rome, where he spent the remainder of his childhood and adolescence and studied physics. For his PhD with Giulio Auriemma, he participated in rocket experiments with X-ray detectors at the IAS (Istituto di Astrofisica Spaziale) in Rome. In 1976, he joined the IAS and worked on balloon experiments. Later he was involved in BeppoSAX, the Italian X-ray astronomy satellite (with Dutch participation, and ESA support), which operated from 1996 to 2003. Costa was in 1981 part of the team of Livio Scarsi, which proposed the construction of the satellite for X-ray detection. On the satellite was a Phoswich Detector System (PDS) used by Filippo Frontera for the discovery of gamma ray bursts (i.e., the PDS was a Gamma Ray Burst Monitor, GRBM). February 28, 1997 was the first time an X-ray afterglow associated with a GRB was observed after localization by SAX, followed shortly thereafter by the optical afterglow (observed by Herschel and Isaac Newton telescopes, La Palma). Two months later, another GRB was detected with subsequent observation in the radio range, thus directly demonstrating by the redshift that GRBs are of extragalactic origin. In 1999, he developed the X-ray detector for the Italian X-ray/gamma-ray satellites AGILE, which started in 2007. He also developed X-ray polarimeters.

Enrico Costa is the author or co-author of a number of papers in peer reviewed scientific journals. Several are published in Science Magazine. Also, in 2011 he received with Gerald J. Fishman the Shaw Prize.

== Sources ==
- Govert Schilling Flash! The Hunt for the Biggest Explosions in the Universe, Cambridge University Press 2002
