= Gerald J. Fishman =

American astronomer (born 1943)

Gerald Fishman
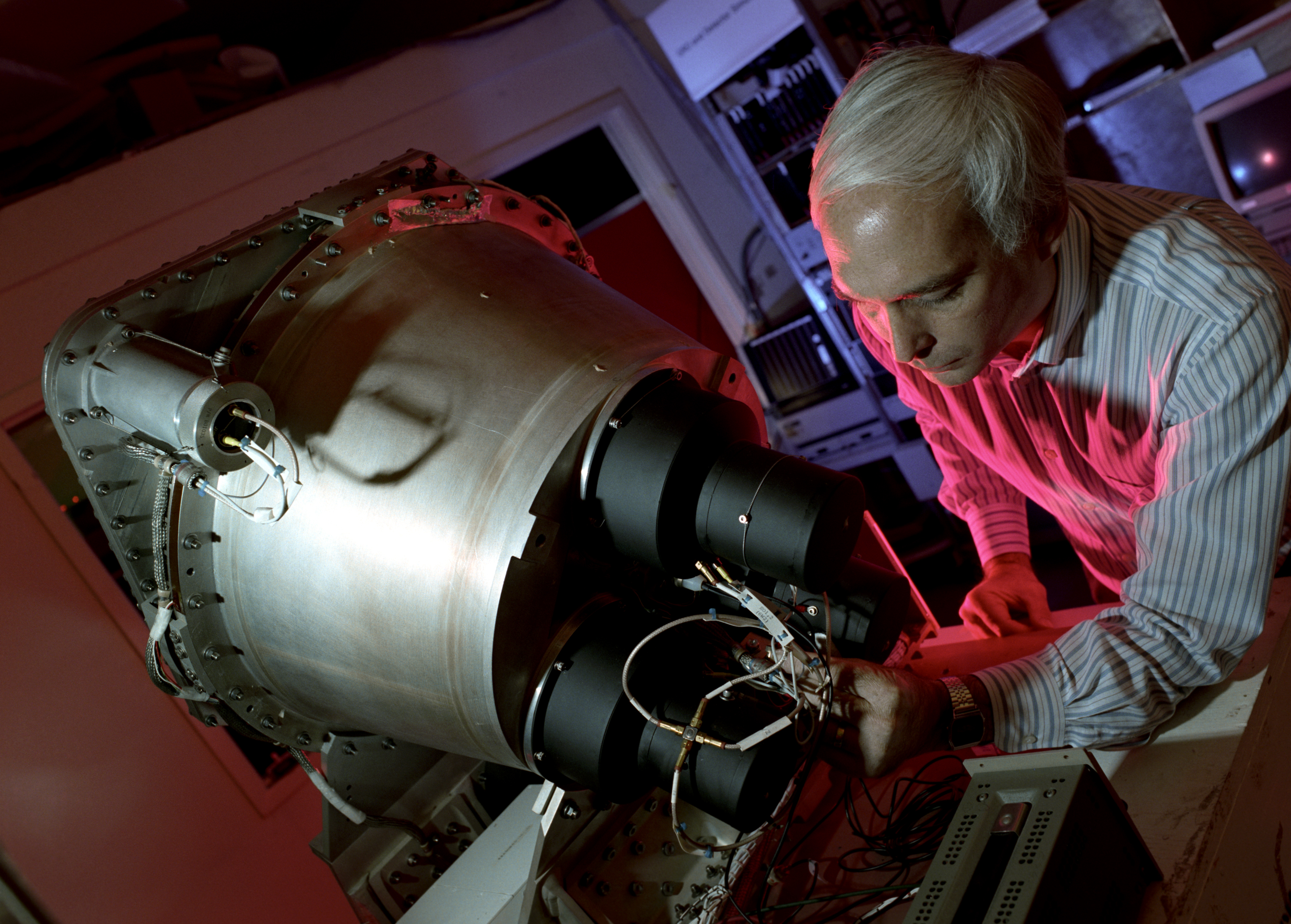
- Gerald Fishman working on a BATSE detector module.
- Born: February 10, 1943 (age 83); St. Louis, Missouri
- Education: Rice University
- Known for: Gamma-Ray Astronomy
- Scientific career
- Fields: research astrophysicist
- Thesis: [Thesis Measurements of Hard X and Gamma Radiation from Virgo A and Centaurus A] (1970)
- Doctoral advisor: Robert C. Haymes

Gerald Jay (Jerry) Fishman (born February 10, 1943) is an American research astrophysicist, specializing in gamma-ray astronomy. His research interests also include space and nuclear instrumentation and radiation in space. A native of St. Louis, Missouri, Fishman obtained a B.S. with Honors degree in physics from the University of Missouri in 1965, followed by M.S. and Ph.D. degrees in space science from Rice University in 1968 and 1970, respectively.

== Career ==
While in graduate school at Rice University in Houston, Texas, Fishman served as a research assistant and research associate in the space science department. He was involved in balloon-borne observations of high-energy radiation from space, and the research group was the first to detect gamma-rays originating from the Crab Nebula. Further observations showed that a large fraction of this radiation was from the pulsar in this nebula.

In 1969, Fishman began his professional career as a senior scientist working on aerospace projects at the research laboratories of Teledyne Brown Engineering in Huntsville, Alabama. This research operation had been instigated by Milton K. Cummings, after whom the Cummings Research Park, the second largest in America, was named.

Fishman joined NASA at the Marshall Space Flight Center in Huntsville as a research scientist in 1974. From the start, he worked in high-energy astrophysics, and his interest soon centered on gamma-ray astronomy. Gamma-rays are generated by celestial events including supernova explosions, creation of black holes, destruction of positrons, and radioactive decay of the atomic nucleus of matter in space. Therefore, the detection and analysis of gamma-rays provide an insight on the fundamental nature of the universe.

During 1978-79, Fishman took an assignment with NASA Headquarters as a staff scientist in the Astrophysics Division of the Office of Space Science. Upon returning to MSFC, he continued his work in gamma-ray astronomy. He was the principal investigator of the Burst and Transient Source Experiment (BATSE) on the Compton Gamma Ray Observatory (CGRO). This observatory was the second (after Hubble) of NASA's four Great Observatories in space. After 14 years in development, CGRO was launched by the Space Shuttle Atlantis in April 1991 (STS-37). When one of the gyroscopes on CGRO failed, NASA decided that a controlled crash into the Pacific Ocean was preferable to letting the craft come down on its own at random; it was then intentionally de-orbited in June 2000.

The primary objective of the BATSE experiment was the study of gamma-ray bursts. The BATSE experiment also serendipitously discovered terrestrial gamma-ray flashes above thunderstorms. The Gamma-Ray Astrophysics Team at the National Space Science and Technology Center in Huntsville continues to examine data from BATSE. Fishman is currently a co-investigator of the Gamma-ray Burst Monitor (GBM) on the Fermi Gamma-ray Space Telescope, launched in 2008. The 2011 Shaw Prize – commonly called the Asian Nobel Prize – was shared by Fishman and Italian astronomer Enrico Costa for their gamma-ray research.

== Recognitions and awards ==
- NASA Medal for Outstanding Scientific Achievement – 1982, 1991, 1992
- Alan Berman Research Publications Award – Naval Research Laboratory - 1992
- Sigma Xi Research Scientist of the Year, Huntsville – 1993
- Distinguished Alumnus Award, Univ. of Missouri – 1994
- Bruno Rossi Prize, High Energy Astrophysics Division, AAS - 1994
- Fellow - American Physical Society – 1995
- Institute for Scientific Information, Highly Cited Scientist (top 1%) – 2001
- NASA Exceptional Service Medal – 2011
- The Shaw Prize in Astronomy – 2011

== Publications and citations ==
As of July 2011, Gerald J. Fishman had over 900 publications, including encyclopedia articles, published proceedings, published abstracts, reports, and patents, as compiled by SAO/NASA Astrophysics Data Systems. Of these, 249 are referred published articles and 138 published articles as first author: There are about 13,000 citations of published articles, including 11,200 citations of referred published articles.

== Personal ==
Gerald J. Fishman was born and raised in St. Louis, Missouri, the son of Irwin and Minnie Fishman. His grandparents immigrated from Eastern Europe. He married Nancy Neyman in 1967; they have two daughters, Lisa and Jodi, and three granddaughters, Morgan, Leah, and Ella.
