= Arthur Goldman (cricketer) =

Australian cricketer (1868–1937)

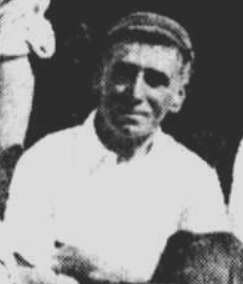

Personal information
- Full name: Albert Edward Armese Goldman
- Born: 4 October 1868; Wee Was, New South Wales
- Died: 1937 (aged 68–69); Sydney, Australia
- Source: Cricinfo, 5 June 2020

Albert Edward Armese Goldman, also known as Arthur Goldman, (4 October 1868 – 1937) was an Australian cricketer. He played one first-class match for Queensland in 1893. He was a brother-in-law of Charlie Turner.

As of January 1893 Goldman was playing for the Brisbane Graziers Cricket Club, and in April he was selected to represent Queensland in the state's inaugural first-class game against New South Wales in Brisbane. In 1894 Goldman moved to South Africa where he became a skater and in 1896 he completed a lap in a race in 11 minutes and 6 seconds which was the record for South Africa. He also played cricket while in South Africa, scoring a 297 in Johannesberg in 1897, and lived in the country until returning to Australia in 1900.

By 1916 he had begun playing cricket again and scored 40 and took 8 for 11 in a game for the Double Bay Pastime Club against a H.M.A.S. Tingira team. He had two sons serving in the army as of 1916. He continued playing into his old age scoring 65 and 112 for the Double Bay Club against a Windsor team in 1923. In 1925 he suffered a severe illness and was hospitalized but recovered.

Goldman died in 1937 and was buried in Rookwood Jewish Cemetery in July with his tombstone being consecrated during a collective consecration.

== See also ==
- List of Queensland first-class cricketers
