= National Space Science and Technology Center =

Coordinates: 34.725°N 86.645°W

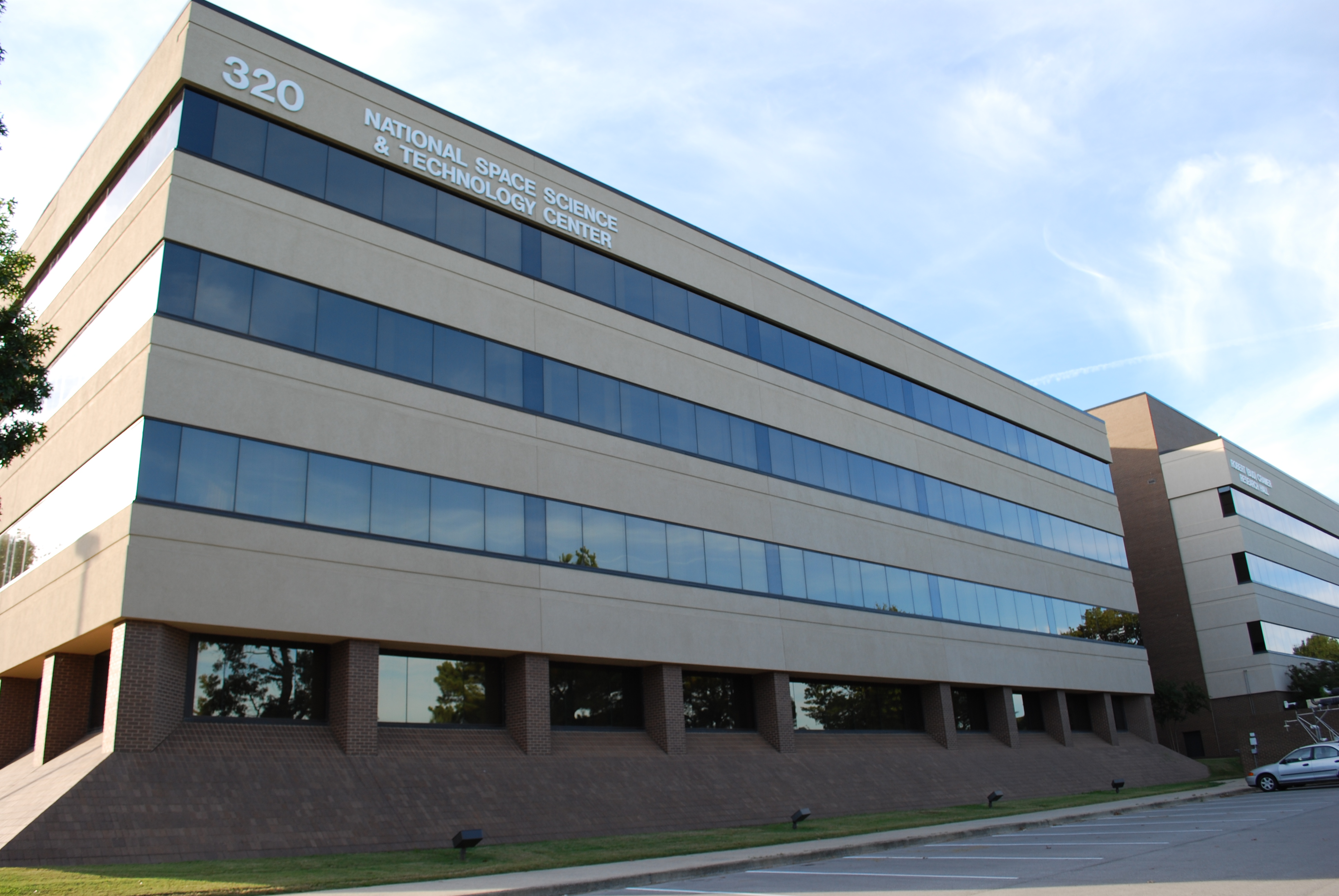
View from the southeast corner of the NSSTC main building

The National Space Science and Technology Center (NSSTC) in Huntsville, Alabama is a joint research venture between NASA and the seven research universities of the state of Alabama, represented by the Space Science and Technology Alliance. The aim of the NSSTC is to foster collaboration in research between government, academia, and industry. It consists of seven research centers: Space Science, Global Hydrology & Climate, Information Technology, Advanced Optics, Biotechnology, Material, and Propulsion. The west face of the building also houses the National Weather Service forecast office in Huntsville. Each center is managed by researchers from either Marshall Space Flight Center, the host NASA facility, or the University of Alabama in Huntsville (UAH), the host university. For UAH purposes, the building is known as Robert "Bud" Cramer Research Hall and houses the Atmospheric Science and Space Science programs.

== List of participating universities ==
- Alabama A&M University
- Auburn University
- Tuskegee University
- University of Alabama
- University of Alabama at Birmingham
- University of Alabama in Huntsville
- University of South Alabama
