= Arthur E. Goldman =

Executive director for Aerojet's Southeast Space Operations division

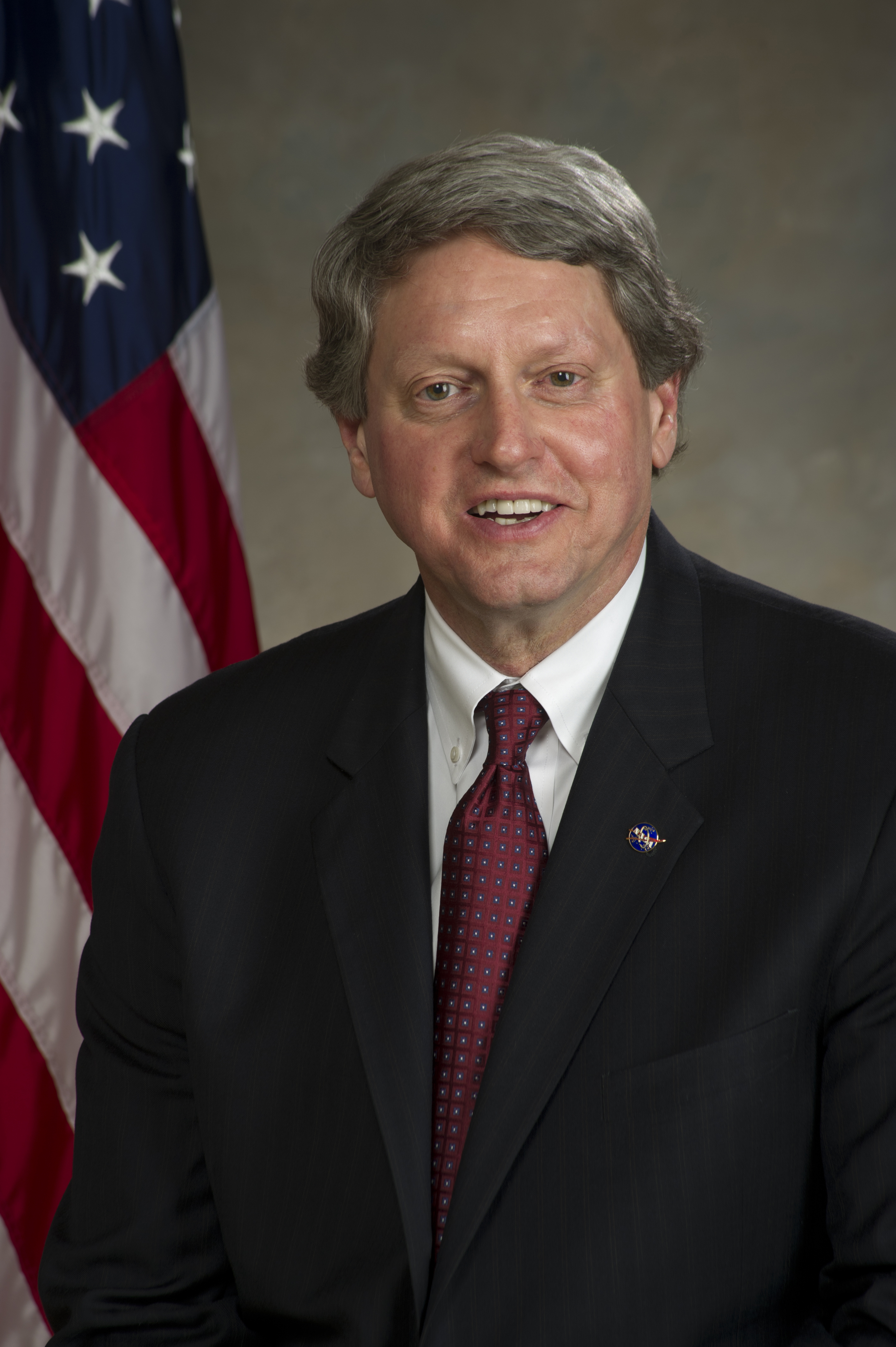
- Official NASA portrait of Arthur E. Goldman
- Born: November 10, 1953 (age 72)
- Education: Mississippi State University, B.S. 1977
- Occupation: Aerojet executive
- Title: Executive Director, Southeast Space Operations division
- Spouse: Nancy Lovell Goldman
- Children: Jennifer
- Website: Marshall Leadership

Arthur Eugene "Gene" Goldman (born November 10, 1953) is the executive director for Aerojet's Southeast Space Operations division. Before retiring from NASA in August 2012, he last served as acting director of the Marshall Space Flight Center located in Huntsville, Alabama. He was appointed as acting director effective March 5, 2012, following the promotion of the previous director, Robert M. Lightfoot, Jr., to Acting Associate Administrator of NASA.

Goldman earned a bachelor's degree in civil engineering from Mississippi State University in 1977. Goldman joined NASA in 1990 as a project engineer in the Marshall Shuttle Project Integration Office.

Goldman currently serves as the BWXT Director of NASA Programs.

== Awards and honors ==
Over the course of Goldman's NASA career, he has been honored multiple times for his work with the agency. In 2002, he was awarded the NASA Exceptional Achievement Medal for "advocacy of small business". In 2007, he received the NASA Outstanding Leadership Medal for his work as main engine project manager for the Space Shuttle program. In 2010, he was presented the Presidential Rank Award for "sustained extraordinary accomplishment" with NASA. Goldman was inducted into the Meridian Community College Hall of Fame in 2010 for career achievement.

== After NASA ==
On July 9, 2012, Aerojet announced that Goldman would be leaving NASA on August 3, 2012, to become the executive director for its Southeast Space Operations division effective August 6, 2012. Marshall's associate director for management, Robin Henderson, replaced Goldman as acting director of the center.
